= Paxton Boys =

Vigilante group in colonial Pennsylvania

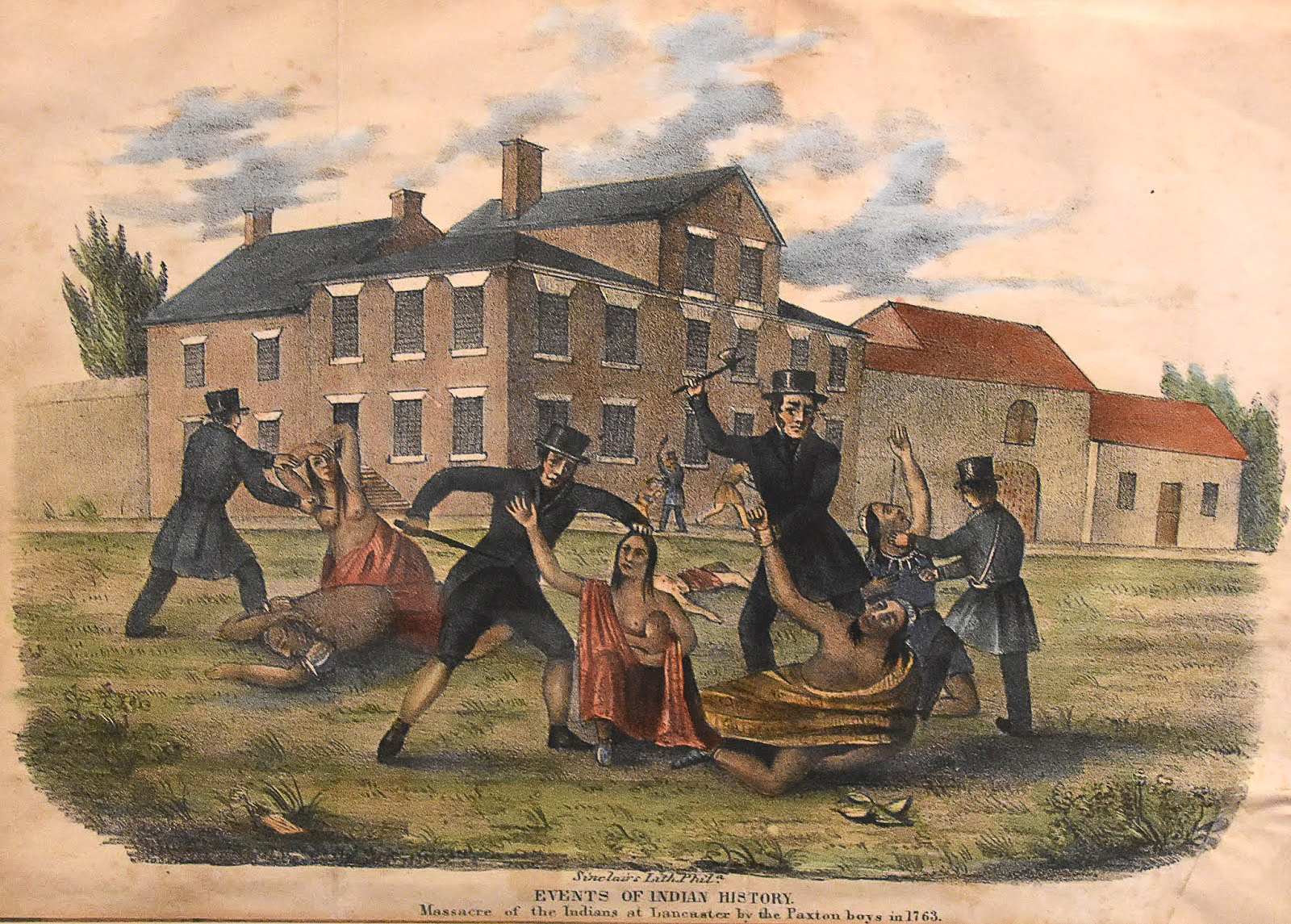
1841 lithograph depicting the Paxton Boys' massacre of the Conestoga at Lancaster, Pennsylvania, in December 1763

The Paxton Boys, also known as the Paxtang Boys or the Paxton Rangers, were a mob of settlers that murdered 20 unarmed Conestoga in Lancaster County, Pennsylvania, in December 1763. This group of vigilantes from Lancaster and Cumberland counties formed in 1763 to defend themselves from Indigenous attacks during Pontiac's War. The Paxton Boys justified their actions by claiming that the Conestoga were colluding with the Lenape and Shawnee who were attacking Pennsylvania's frontier settlements. According to historian Kevin Kenny, the Paxton Boys were extremely aggressive.

In February 1764, the Paxton Boys marched on Philadelphia with the intent of murdering the Moravian Lenape and Mohican who had been moved to that city for their protection. However, the marchers dispersed at Germantown after meeting with a delegation headed by Benjamin Franklin. Members of the group led by Lazarus Stewart later supported settlers from Connecticut in the Wyoming Valley during the Pennamite-Yankee Wars and the Revolutionary War.

== Formation ==
The Paxton Boys were drawn from Scots-Irish Presbyterians who lived in the hill country northwest of Lancaster and across the Susquehanna River in Cumberland County. Many of these settlers were squatters encroaching on Indigenous territory. As a result, the Lenape and Shawnee targeted their scattered farms during Pontiac's War.

Reverend John Elder, who was the parson at Paxtang, was a dominant Presbyterian figure on the Pennsylvania frontier. He was known as the "Fighting Parson" and kept his rifle in the pulpit when he delivered his sermons. In the spring of 1763, Elder recruited 110 associators to defend against Lenape and Shawnee attacks. Elder realized that he did not have enough men to mount an effective defense, but he was unable to convince the Pennsylvania government to allow his rangers to take offensive action.

Citing their Presbyterian faith, the leaders of the Paxton Boys declared that the "Indians" were "Canaanites" and needed to be destroyed. The Paxton Boys struggled with the idea of "friendly" indigenous groups and insisted that “the distinction between 'friendly' and 'enemy' Indians was invalid. All Indians were enemies and must be treated accordingly.” The Paxton Boys also despised some Whites, especially the pacifist "English Quakers and German Moravians [whom] they believed ... jeopardized the security of the backcountry.”

== The Conestoga ==
In the late 1680s, a remnant group of Susquehannock who had been living among the Seneca returned to their traditional homeland in the lower Susquehanna River valley. They established a village north of the Conestoga River near the confluence with the Susquehanna River, where they later were joined by several Seneca families. By 1697, the village had an estimated population of 132. Most inhabitants were of Susquehannock and Seneca heritage, but some Cayuga and Oneida were also present. Collectively they became known as the Conestoga.

From this group William Penn acquired a deed for the Susquehannock's traditional territory in 1700. A treaty in 1701 confirmed the ownership transfer but also recognized the right of the Conestoga to continue to live on and use the land.

Conestoga Town became a small but noteworthy Indigenous settlement. A major fur-trading center in the early 18th century, it was the site of many negotiations and treaties between colonial governments and various Indigenous groups. Its importance, however, declined in the 1730s due to the influx of European settlers. By this time Seneca had become the dominant language, with only a few Conestoga still able to speak the "ancient tongue." The population shrank as some families migrated west to the Ohio Country or returned north to the Iroquois homeland.

In 1718, Provincial Secretary James Logan ordered a 16,000-acre tract of land that encompassed the village surveyed. Known as Conestoga Manor, the tract was held by William Penn and his heirs but set aside for the use of the Conestoga. In 1730, a group of Scots-Irish squatters occupied Conestoga Manor, declaring that it was "against the Laws of God and Nature that so much Land Should lie idle while so many Christians wanted it to labour on and raise their Bread." Although the squatters were promptly evicted, the Penn family began to sell off portions of Conestoga Manor, eventually leaving the Conestoga with less than 500 acres.

The Conestoga remained neutral during the Seven Years' War and Pontiac's War. Although they had lived peacefully with their colonial neighbors for decades, they were no longer able to support their families by hunting for fear of being mistaken for hostile warriors. They bartered brooms and baskets, fished, and tended their gardens, but increasingly they depended on gifts of clothing and rations from the Pennsylvania government. The population continued to decline; by 1763, only seven men, five women, and eight children remained at Conestoga Town.

== Attack on the Conestoga ==
Tenseedaagua (Will Sock), a prominent member of the Conestoga, became a target of the Paxton Boys due to unsubstantiated claims that he was providing aid and intelligence to the Lenape and Shawnee. Matthew Smith, along with five companions, decided to visit Conestoga Town and investigate. Upon their return, Smith claimed that he had seen "dozens of strange, armed Indians" in the little village. Elder sent a written message to dissuade any violence, but it had little effect.

At daybreak on December 14, 1763, roughly 50 Paxton Boys attacked Conestoga Town, killed and scalped the six Conestoga they found there, and set the buildings ablaze.

Will Sock was one of fourteen Conestoga who had been away from Conestoga Town when the attack occurred. He and the others were given refuge in the Lancaster workhouse. Angry that many of the Conestoga had escaped, the Paxton Boys rode into Lancaster two weeks later. Elder appeared before the angry mob and tried to restrain them, but to little effect. On December 27, 1763, under the leadership of Smith and Stewart, the Paxton Boys broke into the workhouse and killed, scalped, and dismembered all fourteen of the surviving Conestoga, including the women and children.

William Henry, a resident of Lancaster, described the aftermath:

I saw a number of people running down [the] street towards the gaol, which enticed me and other lads to follow them. At about sixty or eighty yards from the gaol, we met from twenty-five to thirty men, well mounted on horses, and with rifles, tomahawks, and scalping knives, equipped for murder. I ran into the prison yard, and there, O what a horrid sight presented itself to my view!!—Near the back door of the prison, lay an old Indian and his [wife], particularly well known and esteemed by the people of the town, on account of his placid and friendly conduct. His name was Will Sock; across him and his [wife] lay two children, of about the age of three years, whose heads were split with the tomahawk, and their scalps all taken off. Towards the middle of the gaol yard, along the west side of the wall, lay a stout Indian, whom I particularly noticed to have been shot in the breast, his legs were chopped with the tomahawk, his hands cut off, and finally a rifle ball discharged in his mouth; so that his head was blown to atoms, and the brains were splashed against, and yet hanging to the wall, for three or four feet around. This man's hands and feet had also been chopped off with a tomahawk. In this manner lay the whole of them, men, women and children, spread about the prison yard: shot—scalped—hacked—and cut to pieces.

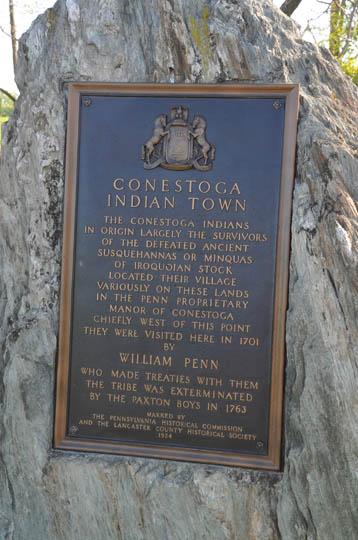
A stone memorial stands at the location of the original Conestoga Indian town.

Following this second attack, Governor John Penn offered a substantial reward for the capture of the ringleaders involved in the massacre, but none were ever identified. Many of the residents of Lancaster County expressed sympathy towards the Paxton Boys, so no arrests occurred.

In Philadelphia, however, many people were outraged about the murders, describing the massacre as more savage than those committed by Native Americans. Benjamin Franklin's "Narrative of the Late Massacres" noted that the Conestoga would have been safe "among any other people on earth, no matter how primitive, except 'the Christian white savages' of Peckstang and Donegall!"

Elder, who was not directly implicated in either attack, wrote to Governor Penn on January 27, 1764:

The storm which had been so long gathering, has, at length, exploded. Had Government removed the Indians, which had been frequently, but without effect, urged, this painful catastrophe might have been avoided. What could I do with men heated to madness? All that I could do was done. I expostulated; but life and reason were set at defiance. Yet the men in private life are virtuous and respectable; not cruel, but mild and merciful. The time will arrive when each palliating circumstance will be weighed. This deed, magnified into the blackest of crimes, shall be considered as one of those ebullitions of wrath, caused by momentary excitement, to which human infirmity is subjected.

== March on Philadelphia ==
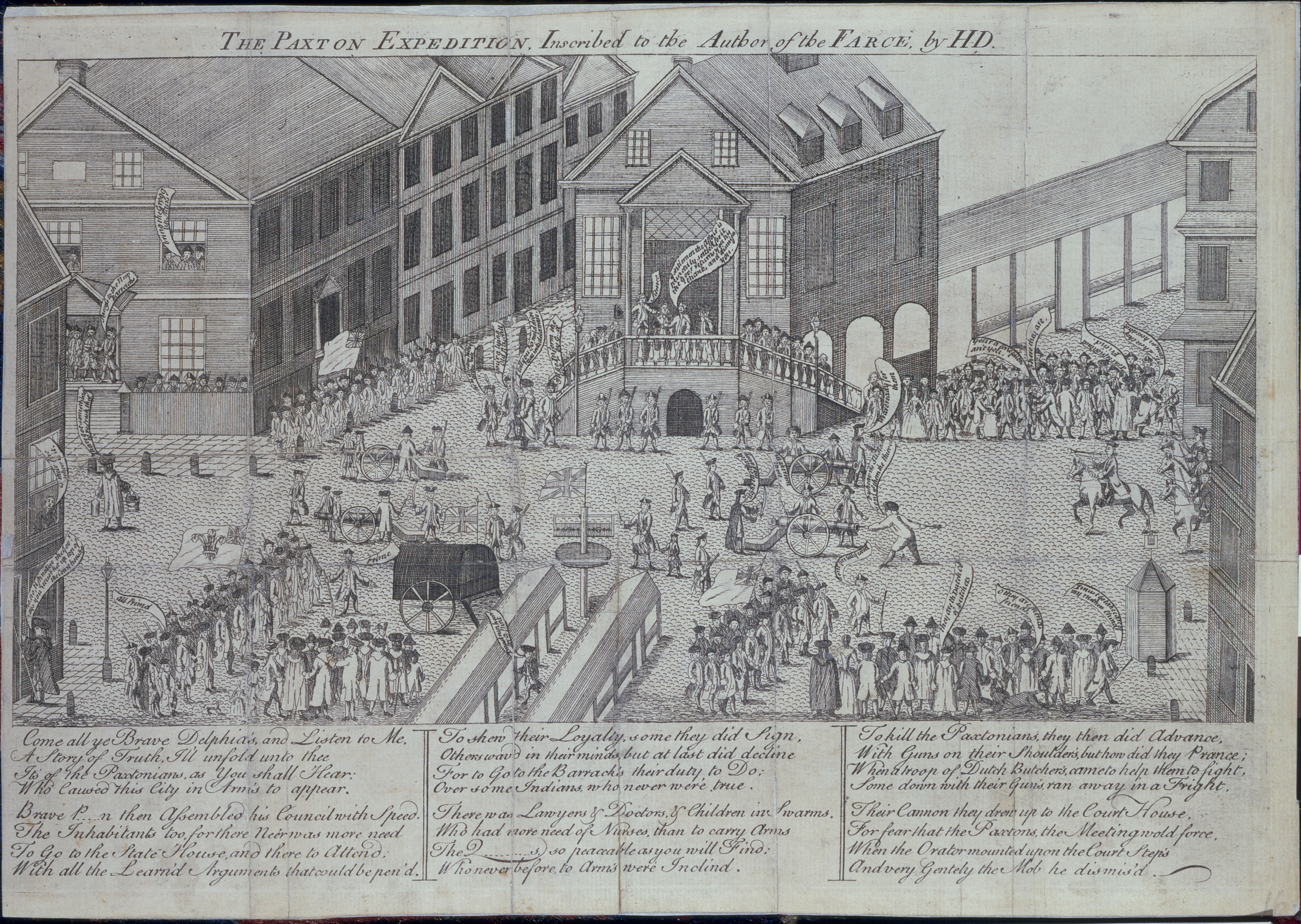
Pennsylvania Associators assemble after news of the Paxton Boys marching on Philadelphia, published 1764.

A month before the Conestoga Massacre, the peaceable Moravian Lenape and Mohican who lived near Bethlehem had been moved to Province Island near Philadelphia for their protection. Following the massacre Governor Penn ordered a relocation to New York. However, the governor of New York at that time, Cadwallader Colden, refused to accept the refugees, and they were forced back to Philadelphia, where they were housed in the city barracks.

In February 1764, the Paxton Boys and their followers, a few hundred in total, marched on Philadelphia intending to "put to death all the Indians in the Barracks." Rumors placed the number much higher. Penn appointed Franklin to organize a volunteer militia. Franklin quickly raised six companies of infantry, one of artillery, and two of cavalry. Included in the ranks of the citizenry were a substantial number of the normally pacifistic Quakers.

On February 5, the Paxton Boys entered Germantown, a village six miles northwest of Philadelphia. A resident of the town, David Rittenhouse, described the occupation: "I have seen hundreds of Indians traveling the country, and can with truth affirm, that the behavior of these fellows was ten times more savage and brutal than theirs.” The Paxton Boys, he wrote, paraded through the streets, “frightening women, by running the muzzles of their guns through windows, swearing and hallooing: attacking men without the least provocation; dragging them by their hair to the ground, and pretending to scalp them.”

The Paxton Boys halted their march in Germantown after learning about the sizable force that was prepared to meet them in Philadelphia. Seeking an end to the situation, Penn appointed Franklin to lead a delegation to meet with the Paxton Boys. On February 7, after a day of negotiations, they agreed to disperse and to submit their grievances in writing.

Two documents were submitted. The Declaration justified the killing of the Conestoga, criticized the government's failure to establish a scalp bounty, and accused the government of favoring the indigenous population over the colonists. The Remonstrance repeated the accusation of favoritism and the demand for a scalp bounty, but also insisted that the Moravian Lenape and Mohican were enemies of Pennsylvania. According to the authors of the Remonstrance, "all Indians were perfidious and deserving of annihilation during wartime." The documents were submitted to Governor Penn and the Assembly; however, the only action taken was the creation of a scalp bounty later that year.

== The Black Boys ==
Although a reward was issued, none of the Paxton Boys were ever held accountable for the Conestoga Massacre. The reluctance of the Pennsylvania government to prosecute the perpetrators resulted in a climate in which it became acceptable to murder Indigenous people. Benjamin Franklin wrote, "the Spirit of killing all Indians, Friends and Foes, spread amazingly thro' the whole Country."

The most notorious incident was the January 1768 murder of ten Lenape and Mohicans, including women and children, by Frederick Stump and John Ironcutter in Cumberland County. Stump and Ironcutter were arrested, but an armed mob broke into the Carlisle jail and freed them. Stump escaped to Georgia and served under Francis Marion during the Revolutionary War.

The Paxton Boys emboldened attacks not only by individuals but by groups such as the Black Boys, led by James Smith. In March 1765 at Sideling Hill, Smith and his followers attacked a pack train moving goods intended for the Native trade to Fort Pitt. Included among the blankets, shirts, beads, and liquor were "war goods" such as vermillion, lead, tomahawks, and scalping knives. The attackers burned the goods, and because they had blackened their faces to disguise their identities, they became known as the Black Boys.

Another attack followed in May on a pack train transporting goods for the garrison at Fort Pitt. When British soldiers from Fort Loudoun went to investigate, they were fired upon but suffered no casualties. Fort Loudoun was later besieged when the British commander refused to return confiscated weapons. Much like the Paxton Boys, none of the Black Boys were ever indicted.

== Pennamite-Yankee War ==
The Wyoming Valley, located along the North Branch of the Susquehanna River in Northeastern Pennsylvania, was claimed by both Pennsylvania and Connecticut. In 1768, Pennsylvania acted upon its claim and hired land speculator Amos Ogden to bring in settlers and defend the valley against intruders from Connecticut. At the same time the directors of Connecticut's Susquehanna Company voted to send forty settlers to the valley. These competing land claims triggered the Pennamite-Yankee War.

Ogden arrived in the valley in January 1769 and established a fort which became known as Fort Ogden. In February, the settlers from Connecticut arrived, followed a few months later by a second group led by John Durkee. As a counter to Fort Ogden, the newcomers constructed fortified houses surrounded by a stockade which they named Fort Durkee. In November, however, Ogden captured Fort Durkee and expelled or arrested most of the Connecticut settlers.

Meanwhile the Susquehanna Company began offering land to disaffected Pennsylvanians. In December 1769, Lazurus Stewart agreed to bring the Paxton Boys to the Wyoming Valley in exchange for land. Two months later, Stewart accompanied by Susquehanna Company agent Zebulon Butler and about forty of the Paxton Boys set out for the Wyoming Valley. They captured and razed Fort Ogden, plundered and destroyed the houses of Pennsylvania settlers, and reoccupied Fort Durkee.

In September 1770, a surprise assault by Pennsylvanian forces under Ogden retook Fort Durkee. Three months later, Stewart, having twice escaped arrest in Lancaster County, returned with the Paxton Boys and recaptured the fort. A month later, Ogden's forces reentered the valley, besieged Fort Durkee, and began construction of Fort Wyoming. Their demand for the Paxton Boys to surrender was rebuffed. During the siege, a third attempt was made to arrest Stewart, during which Nathan Ogden, the brother of Amos Ogden, was ambushed and killed. Stewart abandoned Fort Durkee and escaped to Connecticut with several of his followers.

The victorious Pennsylvanians destroyed Fort Durkee and took control of the Wyoming Valley. In early July 1771, however, one hundred men under Butler and Stewart returned and laid siege to Fort Wyoming. Ogden slipped through the lines at night and obtained reinforcements in Philadelphia. Stewart ambushed the relief force but most managed to reach the fort. After a month-long siege, Fort Wyoming capitulated, and for the next four years the Wyoming Valley enjoyed relative peace.

The Pennamite-Yankee War resumed in 1775, when a Pennsylvania force of several hundred men under Colonel William Plunket approached the Wyoming Valley from the south. Connecticut raised a militia of four hundred men under Butler, and a confrontation took place over two days at Christmas. Stewart, with twenty men, ambushed the Pennsylvanians on Christmas Eve as they attempted to cross to the east side of the Susquehanna under cover of darkness. On Christmas Day, Plunket attacked Butler's position on the west side of the river but was forced to withdraw.

== Revolutionary War ==
The Paxton Boys still in Lancaster County and those with Lazarus Stewart in the Wyoming Valley sided with the Patriots during the American Revolution.

In late June 1778, a strong force of Loyalist troops and Iroquois under Major John Butler approached the Wyoming Valley from the north. In response, a Patriot militia headed by Lieutenant Colonel Zebulon Butler, who was home on leave from the Continental Army at the time, assembled at Forty Fort. Colonel Butler favored delay, as he anticipated the arrival of reinforcements, but Stewart (who had taken over command of the company from Hanover Township) insisted that they should immediately attack and drive off the enemy. The militia and a company of Continentals marched out on July 3, 1778, and encountered the enemy a few miles upriver. During the Battle of Wyoming, a flanking maneuver by the Iroquois panicked the militia and routed them. Stewart died in the battle. The men who were wounded or taken prisoner as they fled the battlefield were killed by the Iroquois in what is commonly known as the Wyoming Massacre.

== In fiction ==
Each of these books references the Paxton Boys:

- The Light in the Forest (1953) by Conrad Richter
- Mason & Dixon (1997) by Thomas Pynchon
- Conestoga Winter: A Story of Border Vengeance (2013) by Robert J. Shade
- The Amish Seamstress (2013) by Mindy Starns Clark and Leslie Gould
- Ghost River: The Fall & Rise of the Conestoga (2019) by Lee Francis 4 and Weshoyot Alvitre

== See also ==
- Enoch Brown school massacre
- Gnadenhutten massacre
