= Lazarus Stewart =

American frontiersman

- Born: 4 July 1734; South Hanover, Pennsylvania
- Died: 3 July 1778 (aged 43) Pennsylvania, United States
- Service years: 1755, 1770–1771, 1778
- Conflicts: French and Indian War; Pennamite-Yankee War; American Revolutionary War; Battle of Wyoming †

Captain Lazarus Stewart (4 July 1734 – July 3, 1778) was an American frontiersman and militia officer. He was a leader of the Paxton Boys, a group of Scots-Irish settlers who massacred a number of Susquehannock in 1763, and a prominent commander on the Connecticut side in the Pennamite–Yankee War. Stewart died during the Revolutionary War in battle with Loyalists and Haudenosaunee at the Battle of Wyoming.

== Early life ==
Stewart was born on 4 July 1734, in Hanover Township, Lancaster (now Dauphin) County, Pennsylvania, and was of Scots-Irish descent. His parents, James Stewart and Martha Stewart, were cousins who married around 1731. In 1755, during the French and Indian War, Stewart raised and commanded a party of volunteers for the Braddock Expedition. His company was later assigned to guard settlements on the Juniata River.

== Pontiac's War and Conestoga Massacre ==
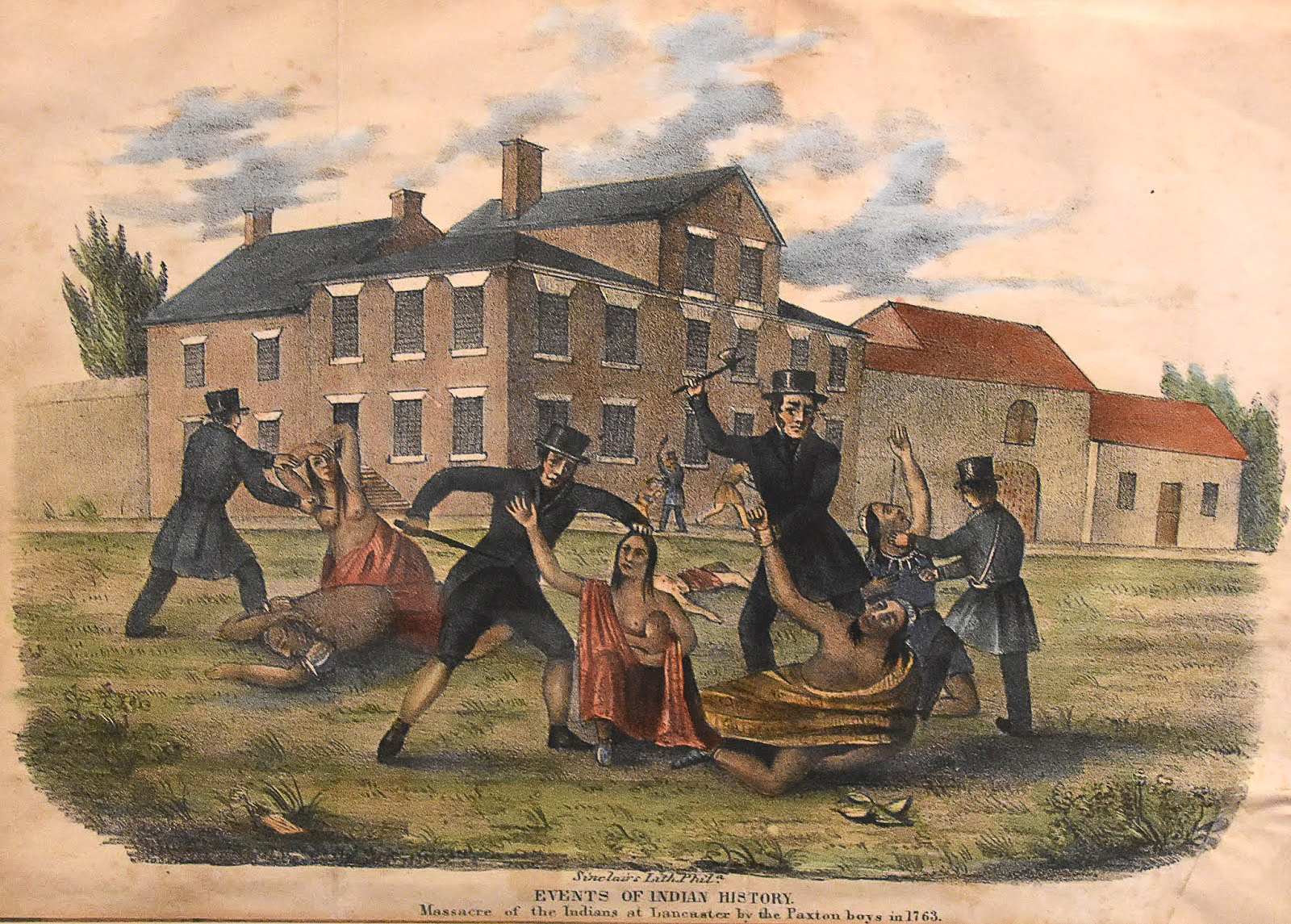
1841 lithograph of the Paxton Boys' massacre of the Susquehannock at Lancaster, Pennsylvania in 1763.

In the summer of 1763, during Pontiac's War, frontier settlements of Pennsylvania were frequently attacked by the Lenape and Shawnee. The Pennsylvania Gazette claimed, "Carlisle was become the barrier not a single individual beyond it."

In the crisis, the response of the Commonwealth government was sluggish. There had long been friction between the Presbyterian settlers of the frontier and the Quaker dominated government, and the damage done by the raids caused further resentment. In Lancaster County, John Elder, a Presbyterian minister, raised two companies of associators, known as the Paxton Boys, mainly from Paxton and neighboring townships, captained by Stewart and Asher Clayton.

Several indigenous enclaves existed east of the frontier, including the Christian Lenape and Mohican settlements near the Moravian mission at Bethlehem, and the Susquehannock at Conestoga Town. Considerable anger was directed by the settlers against the Moravian Lenape and Mohican for their suspected part in abetting indigenous raids, so the Pennsylvania government had them moved to Philadelphia in November 1763. In Lancaster County, feelings were very much aroused against the Susquehannock, the more so after the Moravian Lenape and Mohican were protected by the Commonwealth whose authority the frontiersmen doubtless felt should be exerted for their protection from "Indians" and not vice versa. Elder wrote to the government in September 1763, urging for the Susquehannock to be removed to Philadelphia as well, but the proposal was declined.

In December 1763, Matthew Smith, one of the Paxton Boys, took a small scouting party to Conestoga Town to investigate the report of a "hostile Indian" being sheltered by the Susquehannock. Smith alleged that he saw "dozens of strange, armed Indians" and with Stewart began to assemble a more substantial force. Elder heard of the expedition, and sent a written message dissuading it, to no effect. On the morning of December 14, 1763, just before dawn, fifty armed and mounted men including Stewart descended upon Conestoga Town, killed and scalped the six Susquehannock they found there, and burned the settlement. While the Susquehannock were probably in communication with the Lenape and Shawnee on the frontier, the results of the Paxton Boys' attack were hardly in line with their supposed justification of harboring hostile warriors.

Fourteen of the Susquehannock had been elsewhere when the massacre occurred, and were removed to the workhouse in Lancaster for protection. Stewart and Smith, asserting that one of those fourteen was a known murderer, assembled the Paxton Boys again. Ignoring Elder, who remonstrated with them in person, they descended upon Lancaster on December 27, 1763, and broke into the workhouse. Matthew Smith later claimed that the intent of the raid had been to carry off the murderer, but the Paxton Boys, butchered the fourteen unfortunate Susquehannock including women and children. These incidents became known as the Conestoga Massacre.

The shocked government ordered the arrest of those who took part in the massacre, but to no avail. Even those who had opposed the massacres, such as Elder, refused to volunteer the names of the ringleaders to the government. In February 1764, the Paxton Boys marched on Philadelphia but were met at Germantown by a delegation led by Benjamin Franklin who agreed to submit their grievances to the Governor and Assembly. While the Paxton Boys obtained few concrete concessions, neither Stewart nor any of the other participants in the massacre were ever prosecuted for their deeds.

== Pennamite-Yankee War ==
Stewart felt a great deal of animosity towards the Commonwealth of Pennsylvania, and in January 1770, he led 40 of the Paxton Boys from Lancaster County to the Wyoming Valley. At the time, settlers from Connecticut (Yankees) were contesting the possession of the area with the Pennsylvanians (Pennamites), in a struggle that became the first of the Yankee-Pennamite Wars. Captain Zebulon Butler, representing the Susquehanna Company, recruited Stewart and his men for the Yankee side, encouraging them with the promise of land in what became Hanover Township. Stewart's band captured Fort Ogden from the Pennamites on February 23, 1770. One of his men, either Jacob or Baltzer Stagard, was the first man to be killed in the conflict, when the Pennamites under Captain Amos Ogden unsuccessfully attempted to retake the fort a month later.

Stewart was arrested in September 1770 in Lancaster County but quickly escaped custody. Governor John Penn offered a reward of £50, and Stewart was recaptured in October. Once again he was able to escape, still in handcuffs and without his shoes.

On September 24, 1770, a surprise assault captured Fort Durkee from the Yankees. Stewart returned to the Wyoming Valley and retook the fort on December 18, 1770. On January 21, 1771, a Pennamite force led by Ogden reentered the valley, besieged Fort Durkee, and began construction of Fort Wyoming. Their demand for the Yankees to surrender was rebuked. After Stewart ambushed and killed Amos Ogden's brother Nathan, Governor Penn offered a £300 reward, however, Stewart managed to escape to Connecticut.

The victorious Pennamites destroyed Fort Durkee and took possession of the Wyoming Valley. In early July 1771, however, one hundred men under Butler and Stewart returned and laid siege to Fort Wyoming. Ogden slipped through the lines at night and raised a relief column in Philadelphia. The relief force was ambushed by the Yankees but managed to reach the fort.

After a month-long siege, Fort Wyoming capitulated on August 15, 1771. For the next four years the Wyoming Valley enjoyed relative peace. Stewart, who had married Martha Espy in 1765 in Lancaster County, brought his wife and children to the valley and turned his attention to farming.

The Yankee-Pennamite Wars resumed in August 1775, when a Pennsylvania force of several hundred men under Colonel William Plunket approached the Wyoming Valley from the south. Connecticut raised four hundred men under Butler (now a colonel), and a confrontation took place over two days at Christmas. Stewart, with twenty men, ambushed the Pennamites on Christmas Eve as they attempted to cross to the east side of the Susquehanna River under cover of darkness. On Christmas Day, Plunket attacked Bulter's position on the west side of the river but was forced to withdraw.

== Revolutionary War ==
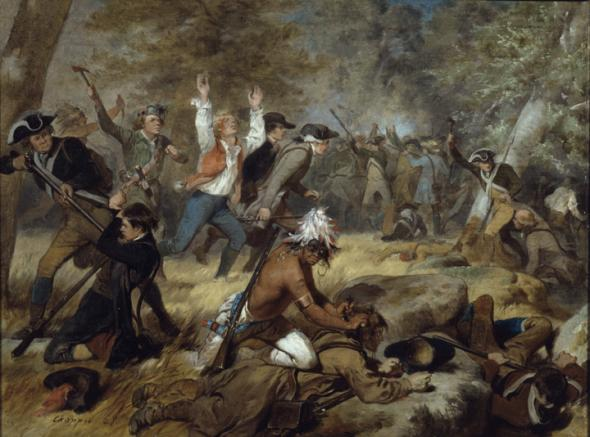
The Wyoming Massacre by Alonzo Chappel. Stewart was killed at the Battle of Wyoming, commonly known as the Wyoming Massacre, on July 3, 1778.

In late June 1778, a strong force of Loyalist troops and Haudenosaunee under Major John Butler approached the Wyoming Valley from the north. Zebulon Butler, home on leave from the Continental Army at the time, was chosen to lead the militia which assembled at Forty Fort. Colonel Butler favored delay, as he anticipated the arrival of reinforcements, however, Stewart (who had taken over command of the company from Hanover Township) and others argued that they should immediately attack and drive off the enemy before they could be besieged in Forty Fort. Their counsel carried the day, and the militia marched out on July 3, 1778. They encountered the Loyalist and Haudenosaunee forces a few miles away. During the Battle of Wyoming, a flanking maneuver by the Haudenosaunee panicked the militia and utterly routed them. Stewart and his cousin, Lazarus Stewart Jr. were both killed in the fight. The men wounded or taken prisoner by the Haudenosaunee were killed in what is commonly known as the Wyoming Massacre.

After learning of the defeat, Stewart's wife and children fled down the Susquehanna River to their former home, and remained in Lancaster County until the close of the war.
