= Luzerne County Courthouse =

- U.S. National Register of Historic Places
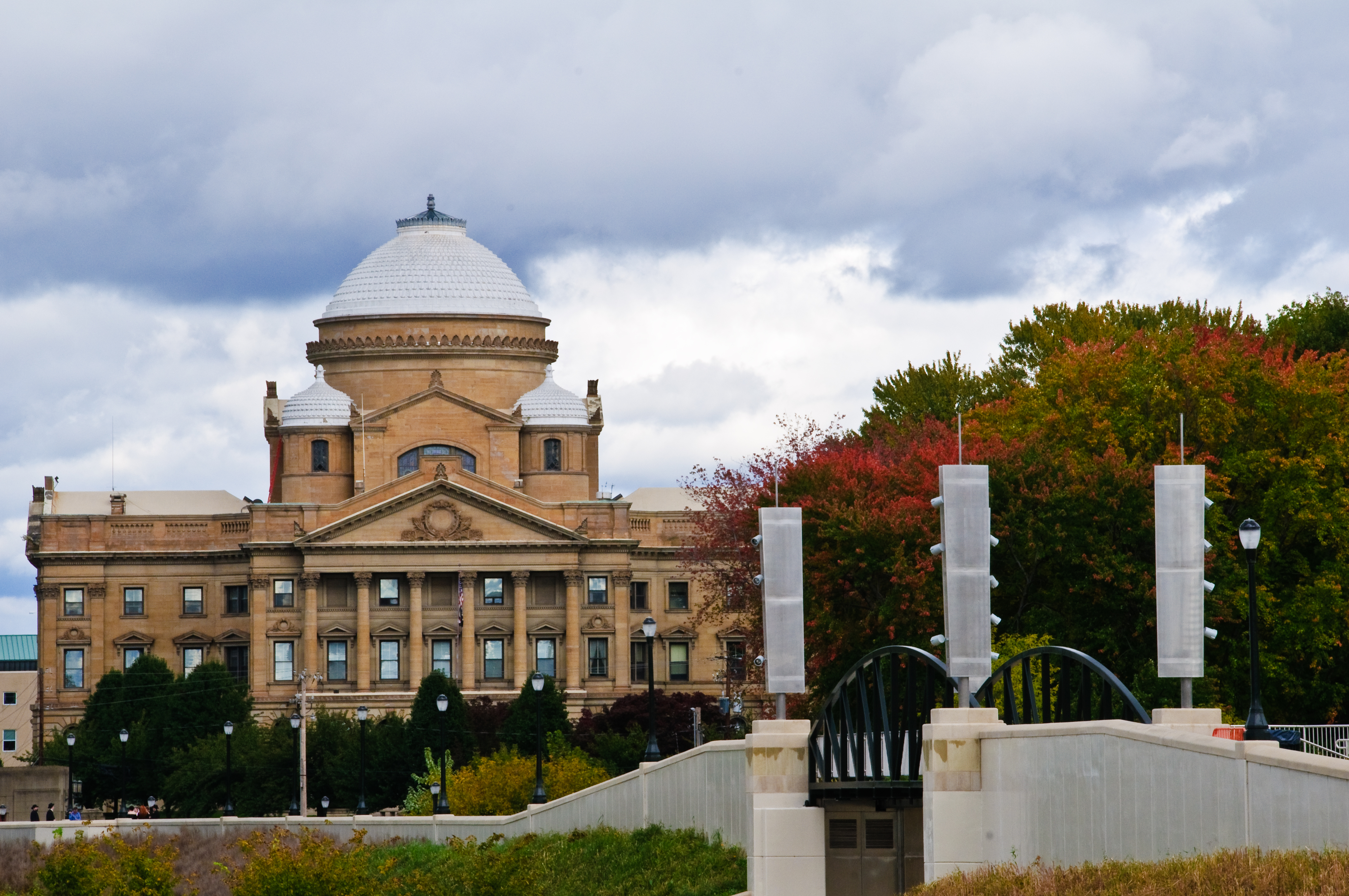
- Luzerne County Courthouse, October 2009

- Location within Pennsylvania Location within the United States
- Interactive map showing the location for Luzerne County Courthouse
- Location: N. River St., Wilkes-Barre, Pennsylvania
- Coordinates: 41°15′5″N 75°52′46″W
- Area: 4 acres (1.6 ha)
- Built: 1906-1909
- Architect: Osterling, F.J.
- Architectural style: Classical Revival
- NRHP reference No.: 80003566
- Added to NRHP: September 4, 1980

The Luzerne County Courthouse is a historic county courthouse located in Wilkes-Barre, Luzerne County, Pennsylvania (along the Susquehanna River). The building houses the government of Luzerne County.

In 2009, county officials celebrated the one hundredth anniversary of the courthouse during centennial celebrations at which Pennsylvania Supreme Court Justice Max Baer delivered the keynote address.

== History ==
=== Development ===
The cornerstone for the courthouse was laid on April 5, 1906. Although no formal ceremonies were held, roughly one hundred people were in attendance to witness the event, which was held in Wilkes-Barre at two o'clock in the afternoon. Placed within the cornerstone was a metal box which contained a Bible, a list of county officials and clerks, a 1905 edition of the Wilkes-Barre Record Almanac, the Smull Legislative Hand Book, copies of local newspapers (Bratstvo, Hazleton Plain Speaker, Hazleton Sentinel, Hazleton Standard, Pittson Gazette, Wilkes-Barre Leader, Wilkes-Barre Record, Wilkes-Barre News, Wilkes-Barre Times), historic photographs (Good Will No. 2 Fire Department, Wilkes-Barre, 1866; Protection No. 1 Fire Department, Wilkes-Barre, 1866; Wilkes-Barre Fire Department, 1866 and 1892; Wyoming No. 3 Fire Department, Wilkes-Barre, 1866; the old and new courthouses; a bird's eye view of Wilkes-Barre and a view of the river common; the Central Methodist Episcopal Church, Derr Memorial and Market Street bridge; and scenes from the 1904 flood); a program from the old courthouse's cornerstone laying, August 12, 1856; a one-dollar bill provided by Wilson J. Smith; and a centennial button. Judge Ferris presided over the brief event.

Designed by architect Frederick John Osterling (1865–1934), the courthouse was built between 1906 and 1909. It is a cruciform plan building in the Classical Revival style, with a domed central rotunda 53 feet in diameter. It is built of Ohio sandstone, reinforced concrete, and terra cotta. It was added to the National Register of Historic Places in 1980.

Fifty-six portraits of men associated with the development of Pennsylvania's Wyoming Valley were painted in groups of four on the building's vaulted ceiling. Many were judges, associate judges or other officeholders. President judges of the courts of Luzerne County who were depicted included: John Handley (1835–1895); John B. Gibson (1780–1853), who later became Chief Justice of the Pennsylvania Supreme Court; Jacob Rush (1746–1820), the first president judge of Luzerne County's court system and a former Pennsylvania Supreme Court Justice; Thomas Cooper (1759–1839); Seth Chapman (1771–1835); John N. Conyngham (1798–1871); William Jessup (1797–1868); Stanley Woodward (1833–1906); Garrick M. Harding (1827–1904); and Thomas Burnside (1782–1851).

Also represented in the portraits collection were: Pennsylvania Governor Henry M. Hoyt (1830–1892); American Revolutionary War soldier and judge Matthias Hollenback (1752–1829); Governor and former Supreme Court Justice Thomas McKean (1734–1817); Revolutionary War officer Zebulon Butler (1731–1795); French and Indian War officer Eliphalet Dyer (1721–1807); John Wilkes and Isaac Barre, for whom the town of Wilkes-Barre was named; John Durkee, who laid out the town of Wilkes-Barre; Count Nicolaus Zinzendorf (1700–1760), a German religious and social reformer and bishop of the Moravian Church who helped Conrad Weiser negotiate agreements with the Iroquois in the Wyoming Valley; and Thomas Penn (1702–1775), a colonial governor of Pennsylvania.

In addition, the foyer's ceiling, which was created by Arthur Brounet of New York, was divided into diamond-shaped panels in recognition of Wilkes-Barre's nickname as "The Diamond City," and decorated with multiple figures, including a female form representing Luzerne County (center panel), and panels representing Bradford, Lackawanna, Susquehanna, and Wyoming counties, the four political divisions in Pennsylvania from which lands were taken to form Luzerne County.

Other sections of the courthouse feature paintings depicting the purchase of the land from Indians by the Susquehanna Company at Albany in July 1754, the construction of the first houses in the Wyoming Valley, which were built for Teedyuscung and the Delaware people, the history and methods of transportation in the valley, including an ox cart, canal packet boat, and train, the Pennamite–Yankee War (1774), and a portrait of Anne-César de La Luzerne, the man for whom Luzerne County was named.

And the first floor's corridors were designed with mosaics of a book and lamp, symbolizing knowledge, a pair of scales, symbolizing justice, and an hour glass, which symbolizes the fleeting nature of time while cameos on the second floor evoked the positive attributes of conscience, courage, fortitude, good governance, knowledge, patriotism, understanding, and virtue. Archways throughout the building were ornamented with representations of: air, earth, fire, and wind, electricity, minerals, steam, and water.

Many of the larger paintings were created in oil on canvass by Vincent Aderente of Jersey City while a significant number of the smaller works, including the east corridor lunettes, were created by Robert Benvenuti of New York.

The dome, which was topped with a skylight featuring a colorful version of the Luzerne County seal, was adorned with twelve allegorical paintings depicting: abundance, art, equality, freedom, force, independence, justice, peace, philosophy, science, truth, and wisdom. At the dome's base, four large figures were installed to illustrate the attributes of America's legal system. Inscribed under the figure of moral law is the Latin phrase, "Hic fons Aequitatis" ("This is the fountainhead of all justice"). The phrase "Mos pro Lece" ("Usage has force of law") accompanied the figure of common law while statute law and equity law were described, respectively, by "Lex Appetit" ("The law aims at perfection") and "Aequitas Sequitur" ("Equity follows the law"). Much of the artwork featured in the dome was created by U. Pastore of Scranton and Frederick Stohr.

=== Centennial celebration ===
The courthouse was rededicated in late September 2009 during centennial celebrations that included a keynote address by Pennsylvania Supreme Court Justice Max Baer and an audiovisual presentation by Anthony Brooks, president of the Luzerne County Historical Society, which provided attendees with an overview of the courthouse's construction. Multiple members of the county's judicial system were in attendance at the event, which took place during the morning of Friday, September 25, the anniversary date of the county's formation in 1786. The weekend celebration also included a dinner dance and gala during the evening of September 26 and a 5K walk/run on Sunday, September 27, which raised funds for Luzerne County Special Olympics programs and was sponsored by the Wilkes-Barre Law and Library Association. The majority of expenses for the three-day event were covered by donations from sponsors and patrons with proceeds from the gala subsequently used for courthouse restoration efforts.

=== 21st century restoration ===
Citing a century of damage, the county contracted Connecticut-based John Canning Studios for a $2.13 million restoration and conservation project. Having been in the building since the summer of 2017, technicians and artisans have repaired a multitude of artwork and design damaged by past water leakage, efflorescence, high-wattage lighting, cigarette smoke, and neglect. An LED lighting system that will illuminate the dome for 20 to 30 years without harming the finishes was engineered. Only six of the 60 dome lights had been working. The project ended in April 2018, when remaining scaffolding came down.

== Courthouse grounds ==
The courthouse grounds connect with the River Common (a park which runs along the riverbank). The Market Street Bridge bisects the park. Its features include a 750-person amphitheater, paved walk-ways, gardens, ornamental trees, seating areas, a fishing pier, and two grand gateways connecting the city to the river. There are also views of the courthouse from across the river (in Kirby Park and Nesbitt Park).

== Gallery ==
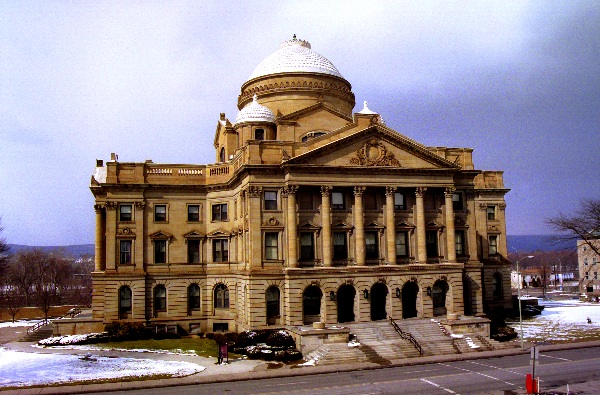
Luzerne County Courthouse in 2007

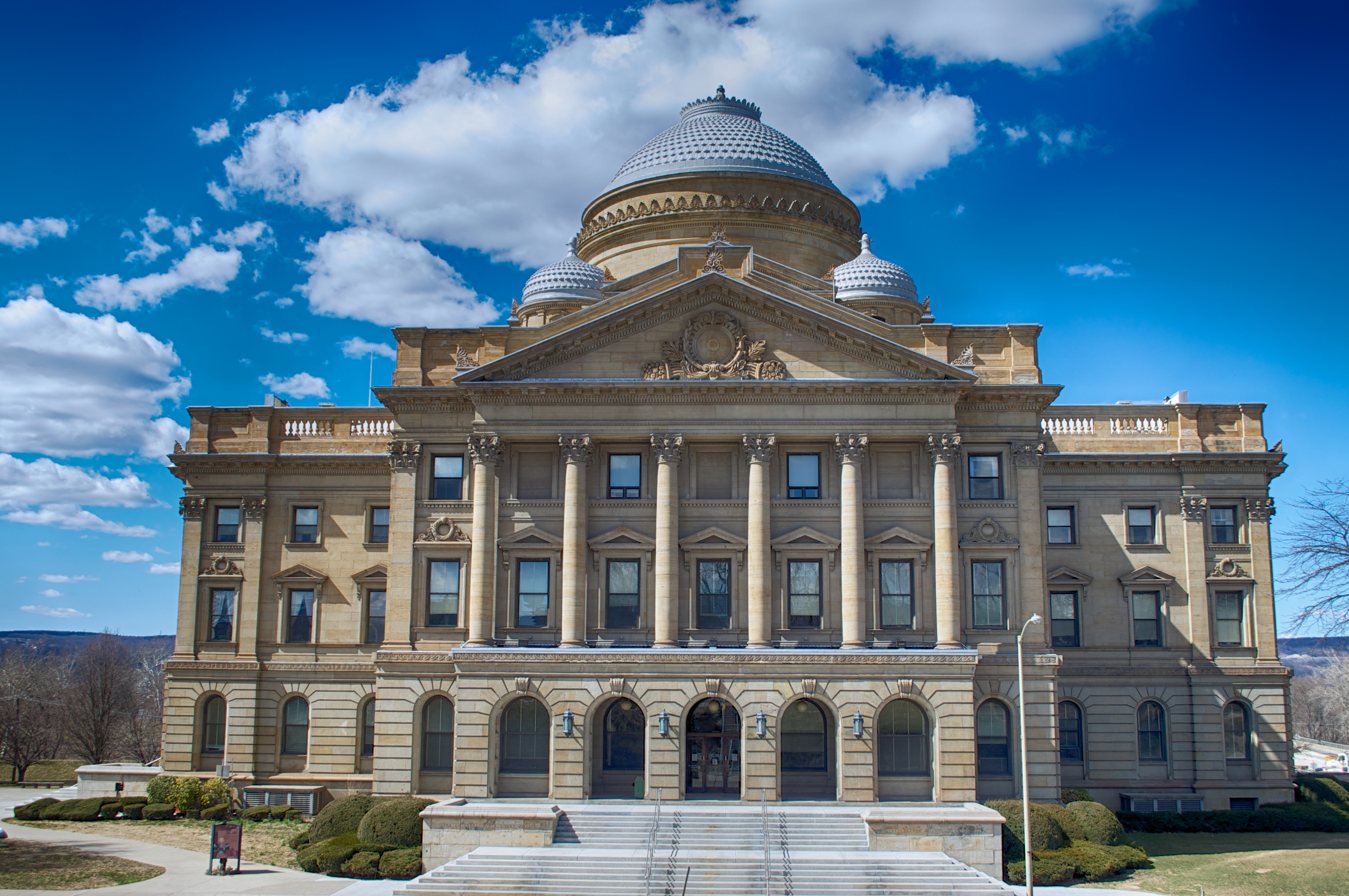
Luzerne County Courthouse in 2013

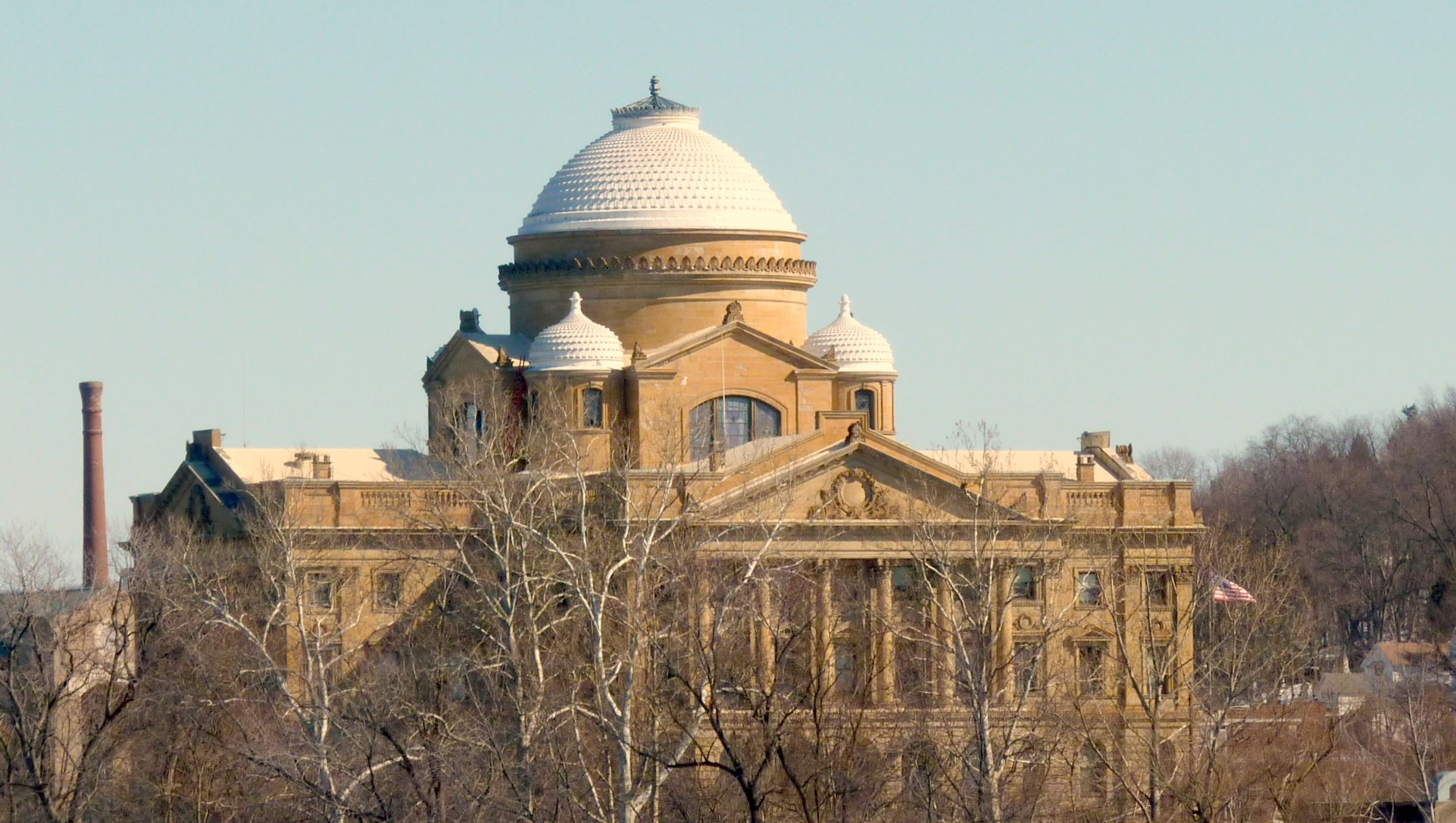
Luzerne County Courthouse

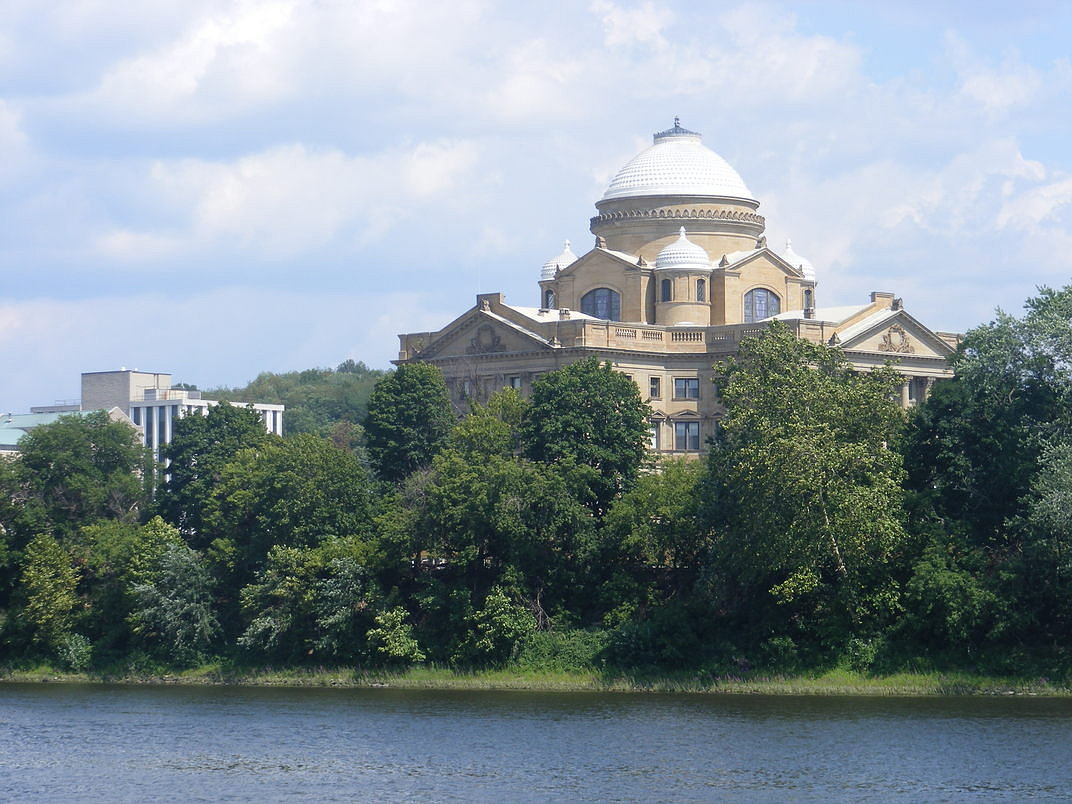
Luzerne County Courthouse along the Susquehanna River

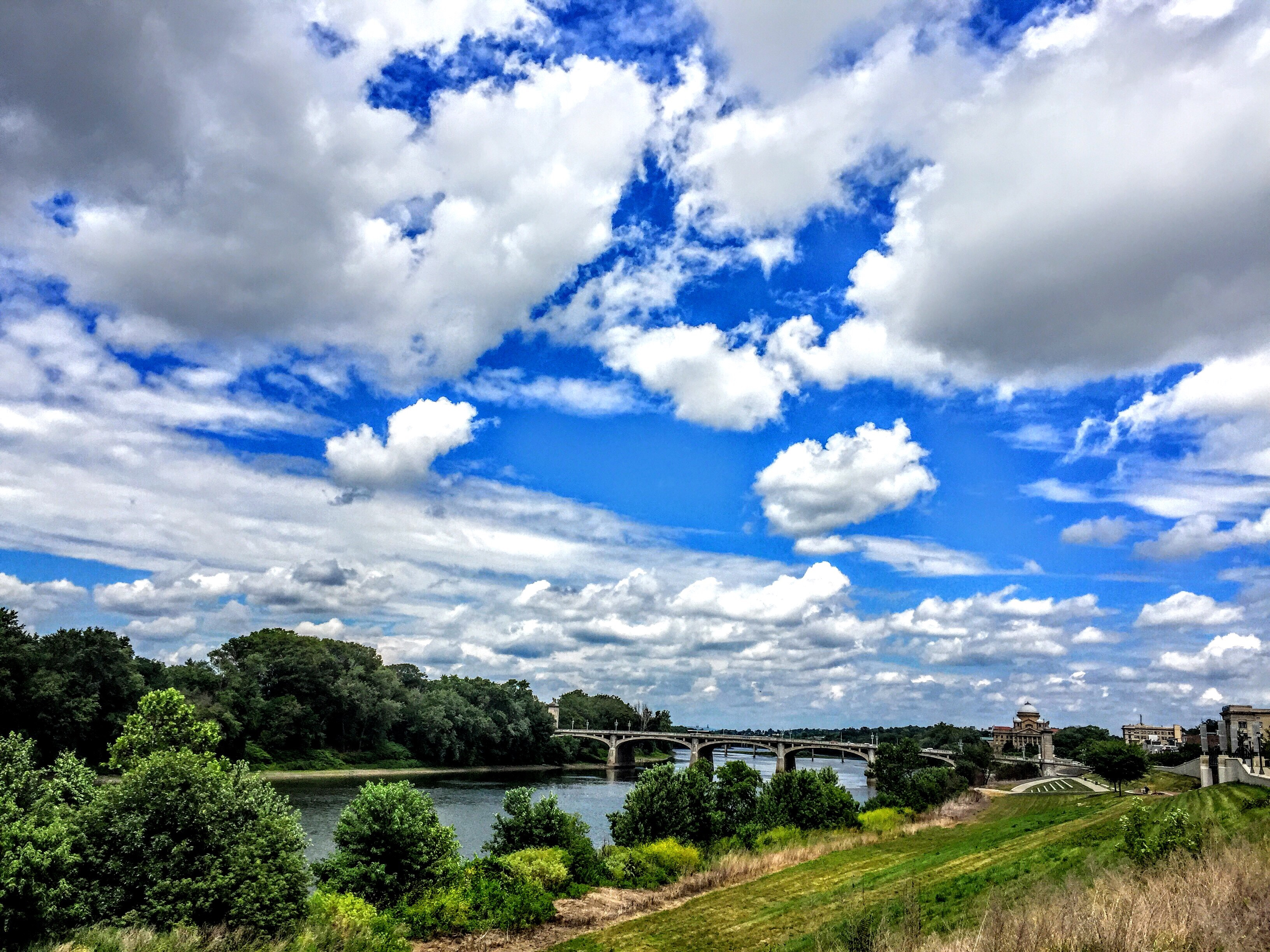
The River Common with the courthouse in the background

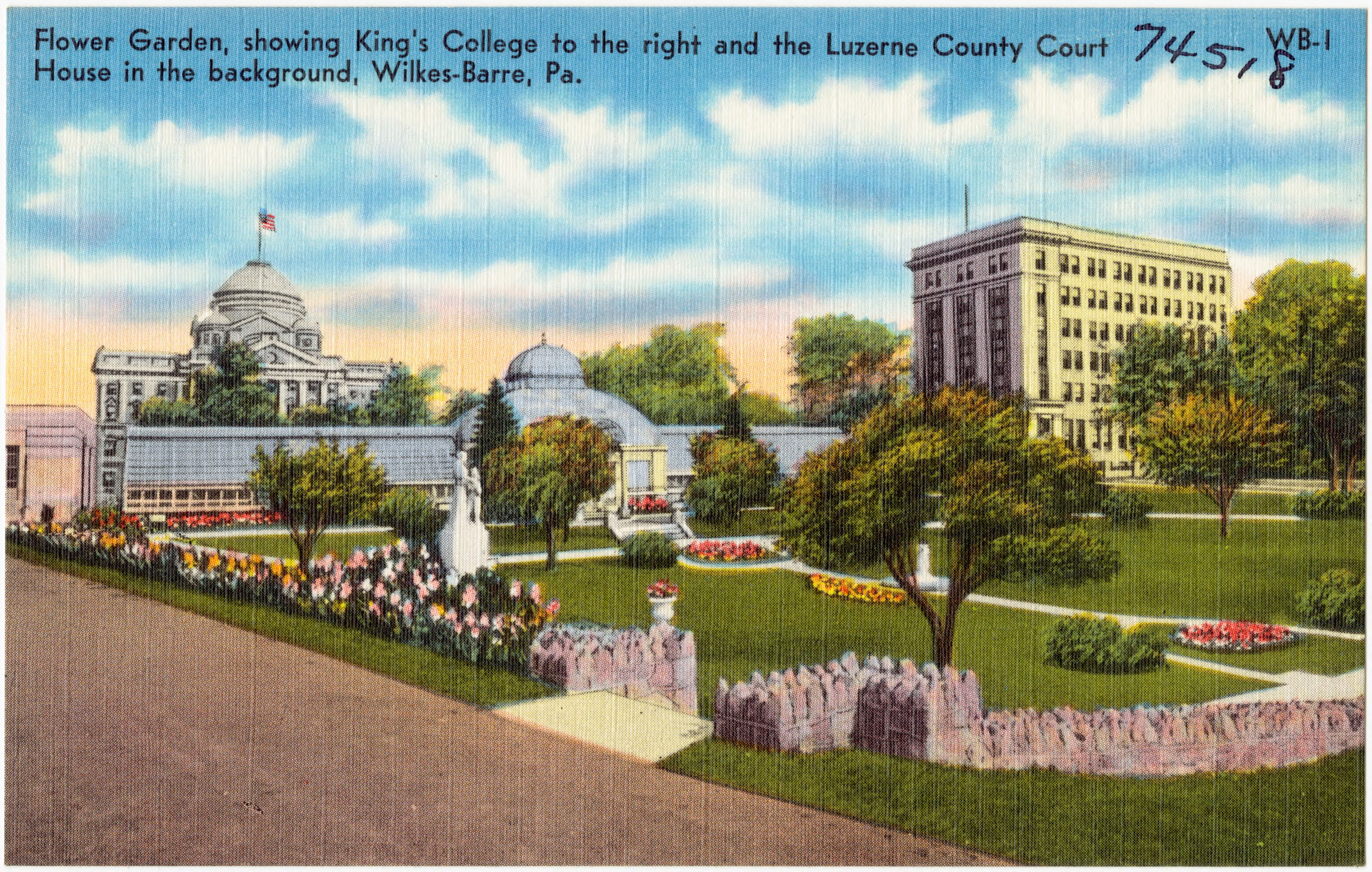
Old postcard of the courthouse and a flower garden

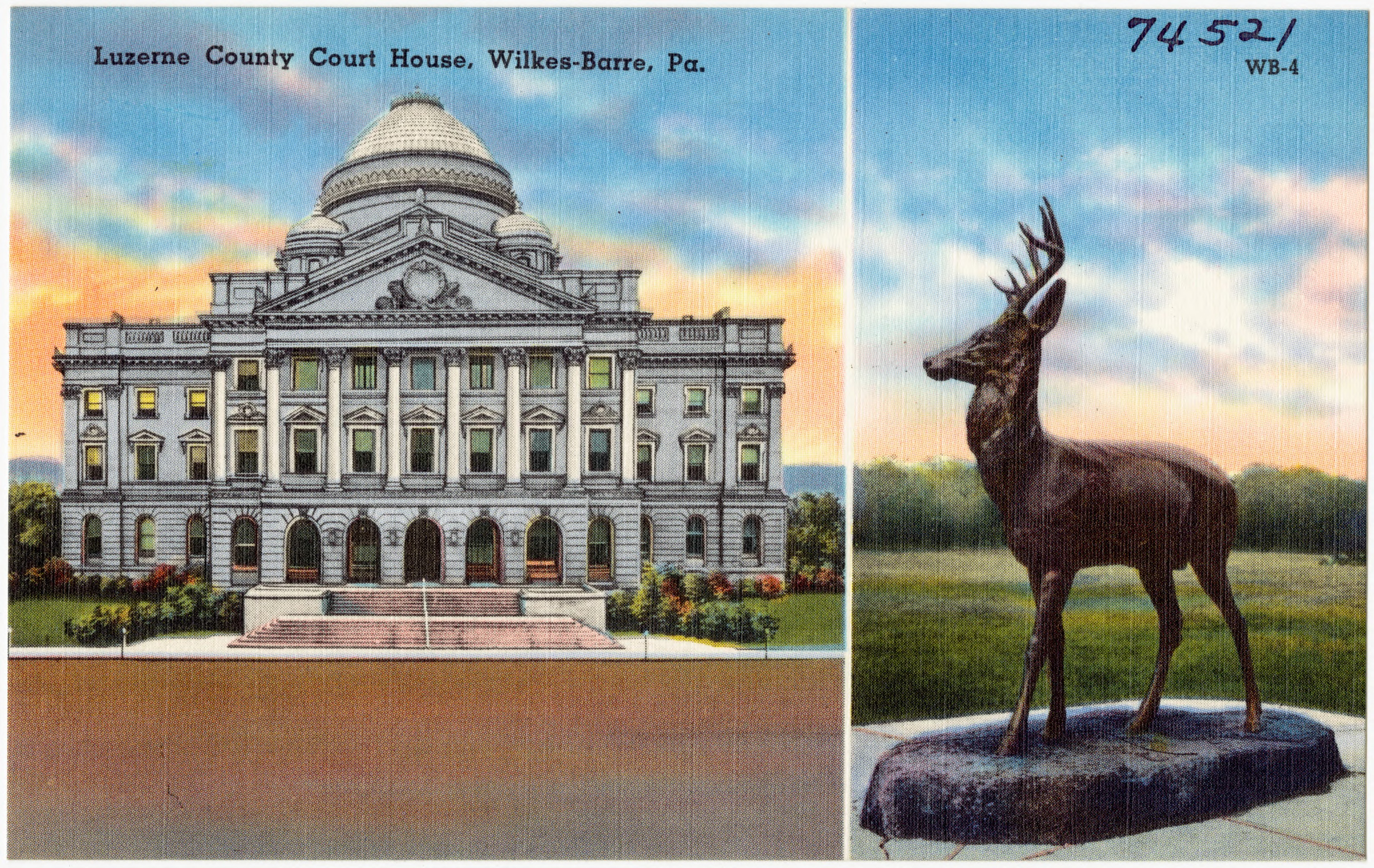
Old postcard of the courthouse

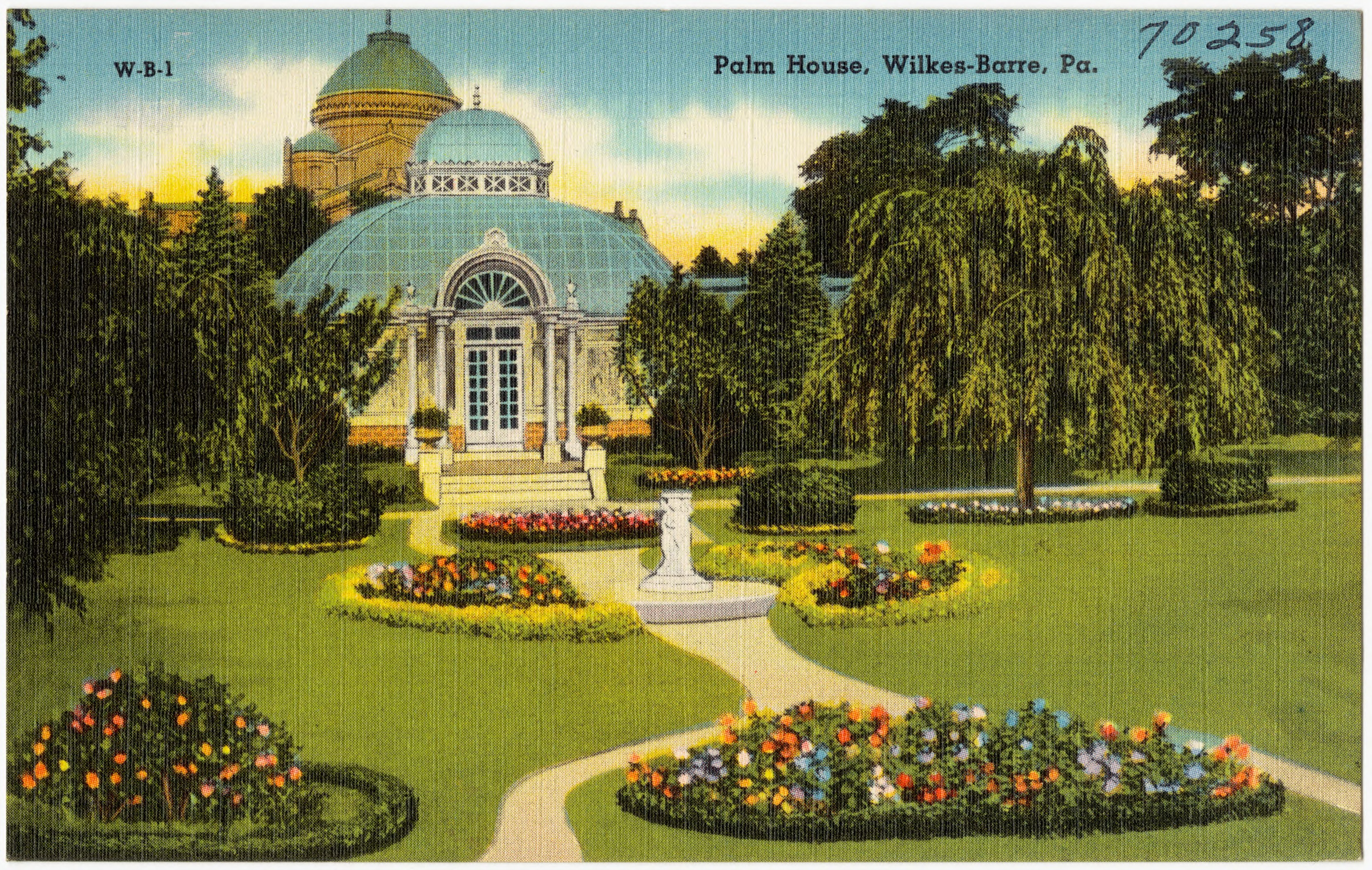
Old postcard of the courthouse and the Palm House

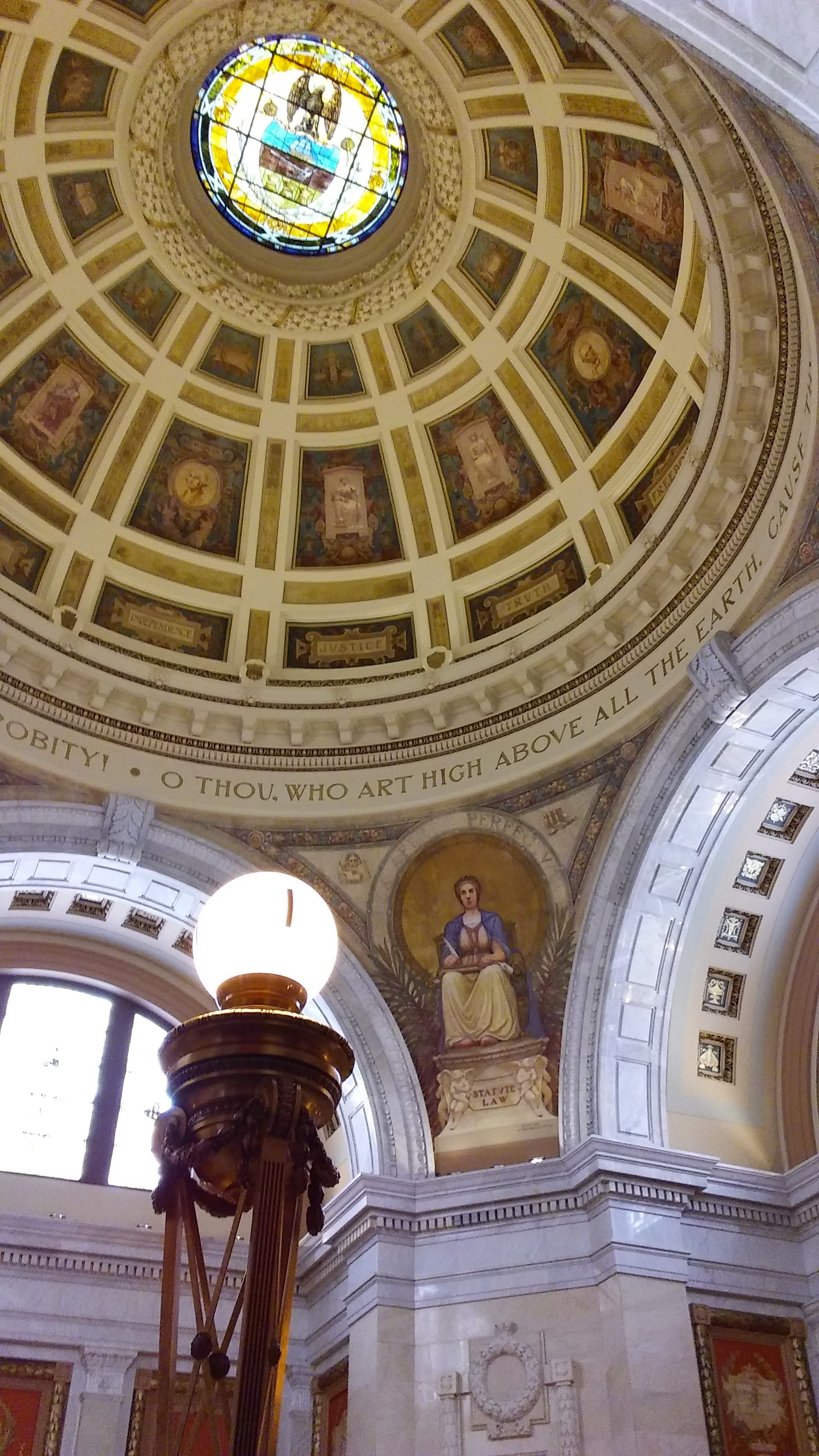
A portion of the courthouse rotunda (March 2018)

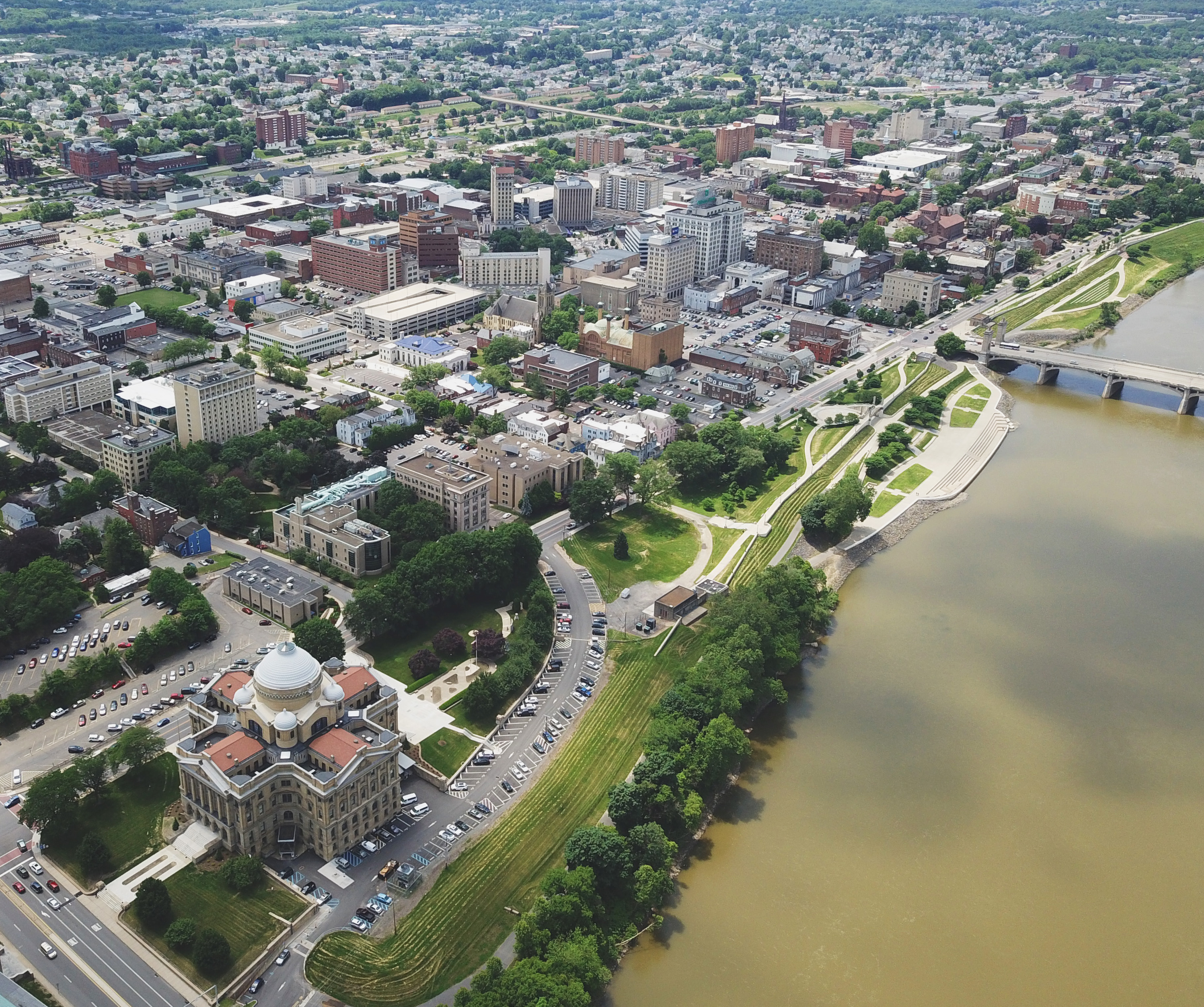
An aerial view of Wilkes-Barre and the Susquehanna River; the courthouse is visible in the foreground

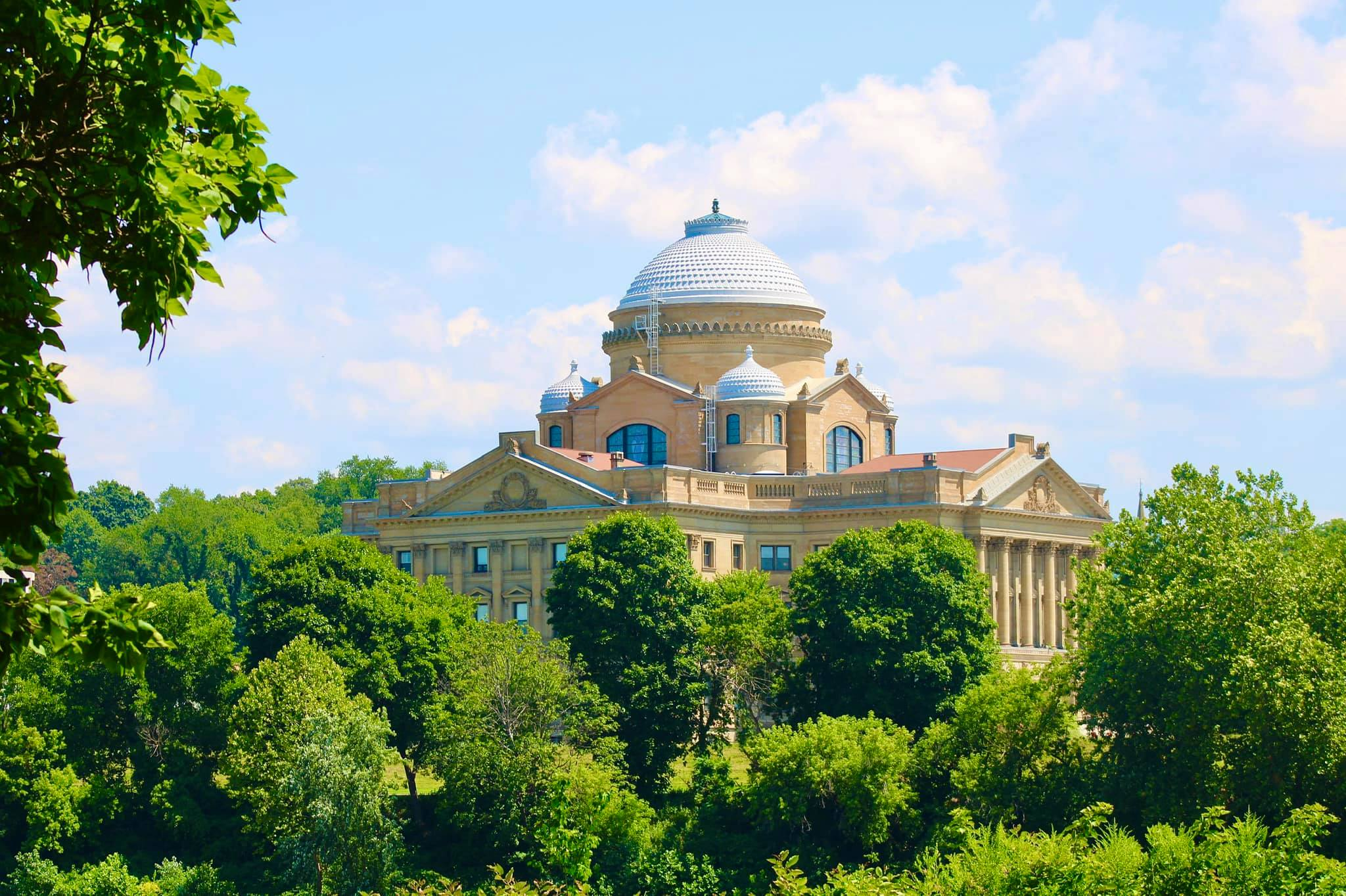
The Luzerne County Courthouse in Wilkes-Barre, Pennsylvania as seen from the Nesbitt Park Disc Golf Course (August 2020)

== See also ==
- List of state and county courthouses in Pennsylvania
