= Pennamite–Yankee Wars =

Series of 18th-century conflicts in northeastern Pennsylvania

Pennamite–Yankee Wars 1769-1784
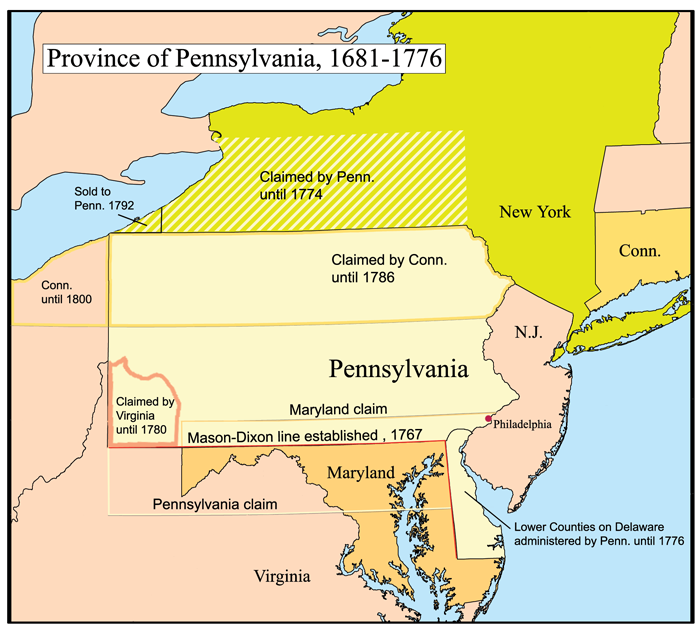
- Competing land claims of Connecticut and Pennsylvania. Three intercolonial conflicts were fought over 15 years in the Wyoming Valley region.
| Date | 1769–1788 |
| Location | Wyoming Valley |
| Result | Congressional court ruled in favor of Pennsylvania claim in 1782. |

Belligerents
| Pennsylvania | Connecticut |

The Pennamite–Yankee Wars or Yankee–Pennamite Wars were a series of conflicts consisting of the First Pennamite War (1769–1771), the Second Pennamite War (1775), and the Third Pennamite War (1784–1788), in which settlers from Connecticut (Yankees) and Pennsylvania (Pennamites) disputed control of the Wyoming Valley along the North Branch of the Susquehanna River. Both colonies (later states) maintained that their original charters gave them ownership of the area. While the first two wars left Connecticut settlers in possession of the valley, Pennsylvania was awarded political jurisdiction in 1782. An attempt to eject Yankee settlers in 1784 triggered renewed violence. Although acts of violence gradually subsided, the dispute was not fully resolved until Pennsylvania’s 1799 Compromise Act provided a process for those who had obtained deeds based on the Connecticut claim to secure Pennsylvania title.

== Competing land claims ==
Under the 1662 Royal Charter granted by Charles II, Connecticut’s western boundary extended to the "South Sea" (the Pacific Ocean). Because the geography of the region was poorly understood, Connecticut’s charter overlapped the 1681 charter granted to William Penn, proprietor of Pennsylvania. For nearly a century, the overlap between the two land grants was of little consequence until the Susquehanna Company revived Connecticut’s western claim in the 1750s, and settlers from both colonies began moving into the disputed territory in the 1760s.

By the mid-18th century, Connecticut faced a growing population and a shortage of arable land. Seeking to address this problem, speculators looked westward to the Susquehanna River's fertile Wyoming Valley. In July 1753, the Susquehanna Company was formed with the goal of acquiring the valley from the Haudenosaunee and encouraging settlers to move there. A year later, the company clandestinely purchased a large tract of land encompassing the Wyoming Valley, allegedly plying a group of minor Mohawk leaders with alcohol and bribes to obtain a deed. The Indigenous leaders who signed the deed, however, lacked the authority of the Haudenosaunee Council to conduct the sale.

Colonization of the Wyoming Valley was delayed by the outbreak of the French and Indian War, which made the frontier dangerously unsafe for settlers. Although the Haudenosaunee later repudiated the sale, the first families from Connecticut arrived in May 1763, only to have their village raided and destroyed by the Lenape five months later during Pontiac's War.

== First Pennamite War ==
As a result of the 1768 Treaty of Fort Stanwix, Pennsylvania's proprietors legitimately obtained from the Haudenosaunee a substantial tract of land including the Wyoming Valley. This acquisition put Pennsylvania's claim in direct conflict with that of the Susquehanna Company. Pennsylvania quickly acted upon its claim, hiring land speculator Amos Ogden to bring in settlers and defend the valley against intruders from Connecticut. At the same time, the Susquehanna Company voted to send a group of pioneers, later known as the First Forty, to establish a permanent settlement.

Ogden arrived in the valley in January 1769 and established a fort which became known as Fort Ogden. In February, the settlers from Connecticut arrived, followed a few months later by a second group led by John Durkee. As a counter to Fort Ogden, the newcomers constructed fortified houses surrounded by a stockade which they named Fort Durkee. In November, however, Ogden captured Fort Durkee and expelled or arrested most of the Connecticut settlers.

In the fall of 1769, Lazarus Stewart, one of the perpetrators of the 1763 Conestoga Massacre, offered to rid the valley of Pennamites in exchange for land, prompting the Susquehanna Company to enlist him and his Paxton Boys to defend the purchase. Two months later, Stewart, accompanied by Susquehanna Company agent Zebulon Butler, set out for the Wyoming Valley. They captured and razed Fort Ogden, plundered and destroyed the houses of Pennamite settlers, and reoccupied Fort Durkee.

In September 1770, a surprise attack by Pennsylvanian forces led by Ogden retook Fort Durkee. In December, Stewart and the Paxton Boys returned and recaptured the fort. A month later, Ogden's forces reentered the valley, besieged Fort Durkee, and began construction of Fort Wyoming. Their demand for the Paxton Boys to surrender was rebuffed. During the siege, an attempt was made to arrest Stewart, during which Nathan Ogden, the brother of Amos Ogden, was ambushed and killed. Stewart abandoned Fort Durkee and escaped to Connecticut with several of his followers.

The victorious Pennsylvanians destroyed Fort Durkee and took control of the Wyoming Valley. In early July 1771, however, one hundred men under Butler and Stewart arrived and laid siege to Fort Wyoming. Ogden slipped through the lines at night and obtained reinforcements in Philadelphia. Stewart ambushed the relief force but most managed to reach the fort. After a month-long siege, Fort Wyoming capitulated, leaving the Connecticut settlers in control of the Wyoming Valley for the next eleven years. Connecticut formally annexed the territory in January 1774, incorporating it as the town of Westmoreland and attaching it to Litchfield County.

== Second Pennamite War ==
The Pennamite–Yankee Wars briefly resumed in 1775, when a Pennsylvania force of several hundred men under William Plunket approached the Wyoming Valley from the south. Connecticut raised a militia of four hundred men under Butler, and a confrontation took place over two days at Christmas. Stewart, with twenty men, ambushed the Pennsylvanians on Christmas Eve as they attempted to cross to the east side of the Susquehanna under cover of darkness. On Christmas Day, Plunket attacked Butler's position on the west side of the river but was forced to withdraw.

That same month, the Continental Congress had provisionally recognized Connecticut's authority over the area pending a final resolution of the dispute. In July 1776, Westmoreland was reorganized as a county, with Wilkes-Barre as its county seat.

== Third Pennamite War ==
The conflict in the Wyoming Valley between Pennamites and Yankees was overshadowed by the Revolutionary War. In July 1778, a force of Haudenosaunee warriors and Loyalist soldiers commanded by Major John Butler routed the Patriot militia commanded by Zebulon Butler at the Battle of Wyoming. Widespread looting and burning of buildings throughout the valley occurred after the battle, but non-combatants were not harmed. Most of the inhabitants fled across the Pocono Mountains to Stroudsburg and Easton or rafted down the Susquehanna River to Sunbury. Some of the inhabitants returned following the 1779 Sullivan Expedition, but most waited until the Revolutionary War was over.

In 1782, Pennsylvania formally challenged Connecticut's jurisdiction under Article IX of the Articles of Confederation. A special congressional court convened in Trenton, New Jersey, and in late December unanimously ruled in favor of Pennsylvania’s sovereignty over the territory. The Trenton Decree, however, only settled political jurisdiction, not the property rights of those who had acquired land from the Susquehanna Company.

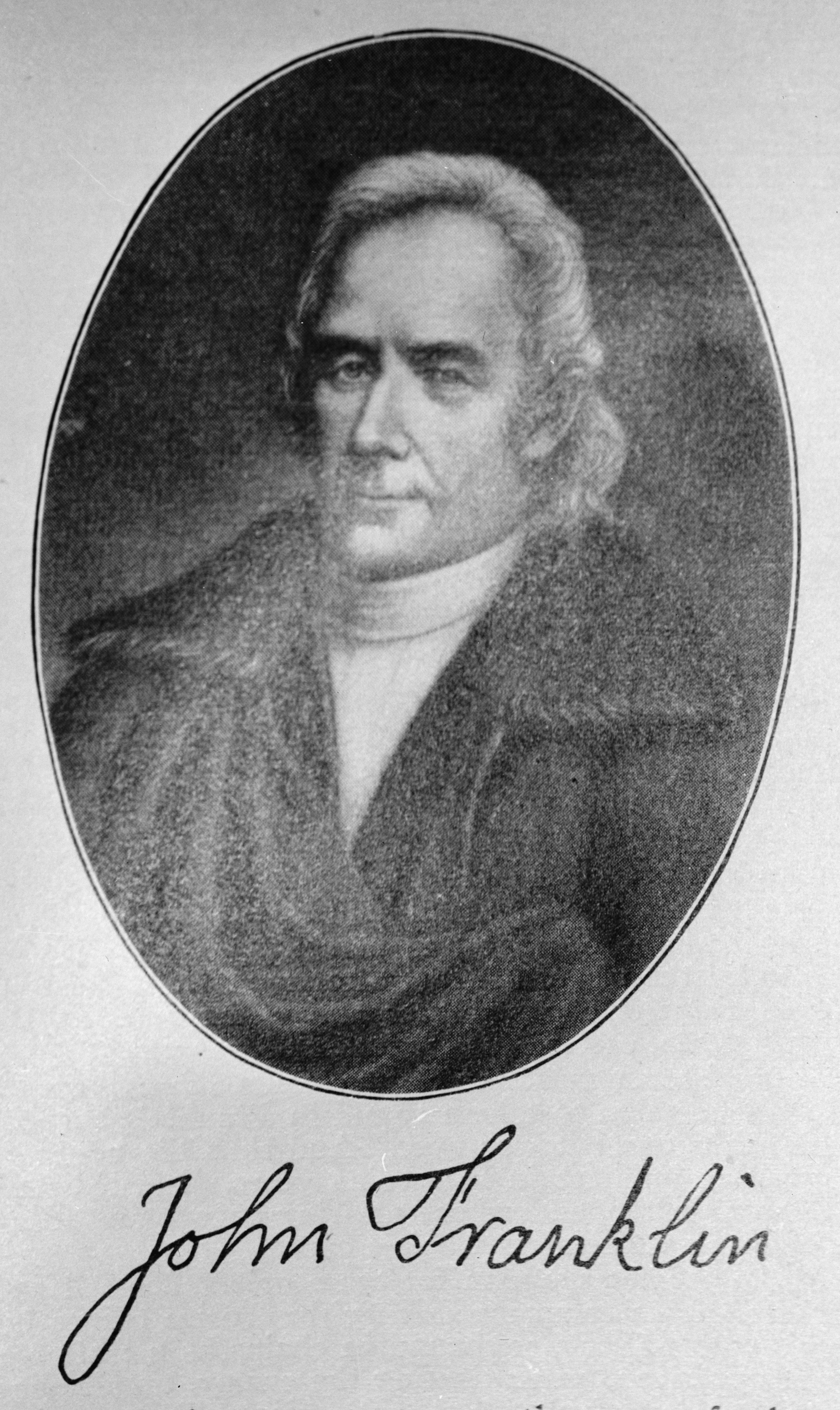
John Franklin (1749-1831) was a leader of the Wild Yankees during the Pennamite-Yankee Wars.

In the immediate aftermath of the Trenton decision, Pennsylvania sought to remove Connecticut settlers from the Wyoming Valley, reigniting the Pennamite-Yankee Wars. In May 1784, the Pennamites, led by magistrate Alexander Patterson, forcibly removed about 150 Connecticut families with the assistance of the Pennsylvania soldiers garrisoned at Fort Wyoming. The Yankees, led by John Franklin, retaliated when the garrison was withdrawn that summer, driving away many of the Pennamites who had recently received grants from Pennsylvania. A "culture of violence" developed, characterized by threats, harassment, intimidation, theft, vandalism, assaults, arson, kidnappings, and several murders.

In an attempt to restore order, the Pennsylvania General Assembly created Luzerne County in 1786. In 1787, it passed the Confirming Act, which recognized the tenure of settlers who had claimed and occupied land before 1782. The act, however, did not recognize the claims of land speculators, nor did it confirm the title of those from Connecticut who had settled in the Wyoming region after the Trenton decision.

The Confirming Act angered people on both sides of the dispute. Many settlers who had received title from Pennsylvania were forced to give up their homes in exchange for marginal land elsewhere in the state. At the same time, recently arrived Connecticut settlers found their right to their properties challenged, prompting resistance. The act also triggered protests from Pennsylvania land speculators, who lobbied the state to protect their property rights, and the Susquehanna Company, which saw its business threatened.

The legislation also created friction within the Yankee community. Moderates, weary of decades of conflict, rallied behind Timothy Pickering. Pickering urged New England settlers to swear allegiance to the Commonwealth of Pennsylvania and obtain confirmation of their titles from the state. Meanwhile, the "Wild Yankees" rejected Pennsylvania authority completely. Led by Franklin and covertly backed by the Susquehanna Company, this faction wanted the Trenton Decree overturned.

Franklin was arrested for treason in October 1787, charged with fomenting insurrection and resisting state authority. In June 1788, a band of Wild Yankees abducted Pickering from his home and held him captive for nearly three weeks in order to pressure Pennsylvania authorities to release their leader. Although the plan failed, the Pickering kidnapping marked a transition from an "often bloody dispute" toward reliance on political means and the courts to settle conflicts, although sporadic violence continued.

== Resolution ==
The end of the Pennamite-Yankee Wars came through court decisions and legislative compromise. The 1795 federal court ruling in Van Horne's Lessee v. Dorrance represented a rejection of the Connecticut claim. The court described the 1754 purchase on which that claim rested as "radically defective and faulty." The ruling held that under Pennsylvania law, Connecticut settlers could not derive title from an unauthorized "Indian purchase." In 1799, Pennsylvania passed the Compromise Act, appointing commissioners to examine and settle the claims of settlers who had obtained deeds from the Susquehanna Company, thus providing a way to obtain Pennsylvania patents and ending decades of conflict.
