= Matthias Hollenback =

American soldier

Matthias Hollenback (15 February 1752, Virginia – 18 February 1829) was an American Revolutionary War soldier, judge, and merchant in early Elmira, New York.

== Early years ==
Matthias Hollenback was born in Virginia on 15 February, 1752. Attracted by stories of the Wyoming Valley, like many other young men of his time, he decided to make it his home. As early as 1771, when Hollenback was 18, he was one of the inhabitants of the stockade at the point where Mill Creek unites with the Susquehanna River. Huts were erected around the inside against the upright timbers. One was possessed by Capt. Zebulon Butler; next in the row was the store, containing the belongings of Hollenback. A boarding hut, having two rooms, was the third in order, kept by Dr. Sprague; Nathan Denison, a young bachelor from Stonington, had the next hut.

== Career ==
On the enlistment of two independent companies being directed at Westmoreland, Congress appointed Hollenback as an ensign. When danger to Wyoming Valley became imminent, and Congress ignored pressing calls for protection, throwing up his commission, he returned to Wyoming to meet danger. The skill acquired by 18 months' service in camp, was imparted to the militia, and his undaunted and elastic spirit infused into all around him. When the invasion came by John Butler at the Battle of Wyoming, Hollenback was among the foremost who sprang to their arms, and prepared to meet the foe. This army was composed chiefly of aged, or very young men, hastily called together. Nearly all who were able to bear arms assembled; and Hollenback took his station in the midst of them. With hopeless odds facing them, Hollenback was among those who escaped to the river, swam to Monocacy Island, and then to the eastern shore. Foreseeing the necessity of instant aid from abroad, mounting his horse, he rode all night, gave information to Capt. Simon Spalding's company. Hollenback was actively engaged in collecting the remains of the slain, and giving them the most burial circumstances at that time permitted.

On the passage by the Connecticut Assembly of a resolve, allowing Wyoming to make their own powder, Hollenback was looked to, to provide the requisite machinery. His arrival with the "Pounders" was spoken of by Mrs. Jenkins, with exultation, as an important event; for previously powder for the settlement was chiefly brought from Connecticut on horseback.

After the enemy retired, Hollenback was among the first to return and resume his business, becoming wealthy and independent. He established stores at various points between Wilkes-Barre and Genesee County, along the Susquehanna. In almost every instance where a store was erected, a farm was bought, and the cultivation of the soil went hand in hand with the disposal of merchandise.

After the jurisdiction of Connecticut ceased, and the laws of Pennsylvania were introduced, Hollenback received repeated public praise. He was chosen to command a regiment of militia, at an early day. Hollenback was appointed, on the organization of Luzerne County, to the position of associate judge, along with Col. Denison. He performed the duties of his judicial office to general satisfaction, for nearly 40 years, retaining the commission to the time of his death. Hollenback died on 18 February, 1829, age 77, leaving to his children and grandchildren a large property, variously estimated at from US$300,000–$400,000.
