= John Elder (pastor) =

- Born: January 26, 1706; Edinburgh, Scotland
- Died: July 17, 1792 (aged 86); Paxton Township, Dauphin County, Pennsylvania
- Burial place: Paxton Presbyterian Churchyard
- Spouses: Mary Baker (b. 1715, m. 1740, d. 1749); Mary Simpson (b. 1732, m. 1751, d. 1786)
- Children: 3,10
- Religion: Presbyterian (Old-Side)
- Ordained: December 22, 1738
- Congregations served: Paxtang (1738–92); Derry (1775–92); Harrisburg (1787–92)
- Title: Reverend

The Reverend John Elder (January 26, 1706 – July 17, 1792), known as the "Fighting Pastor", was the pastor for the Paxtang congregation, located in present-day Dauphin County, Pennsylvania, near Harrisburg. He founded the Paxton Boys.

== Biography and career ==
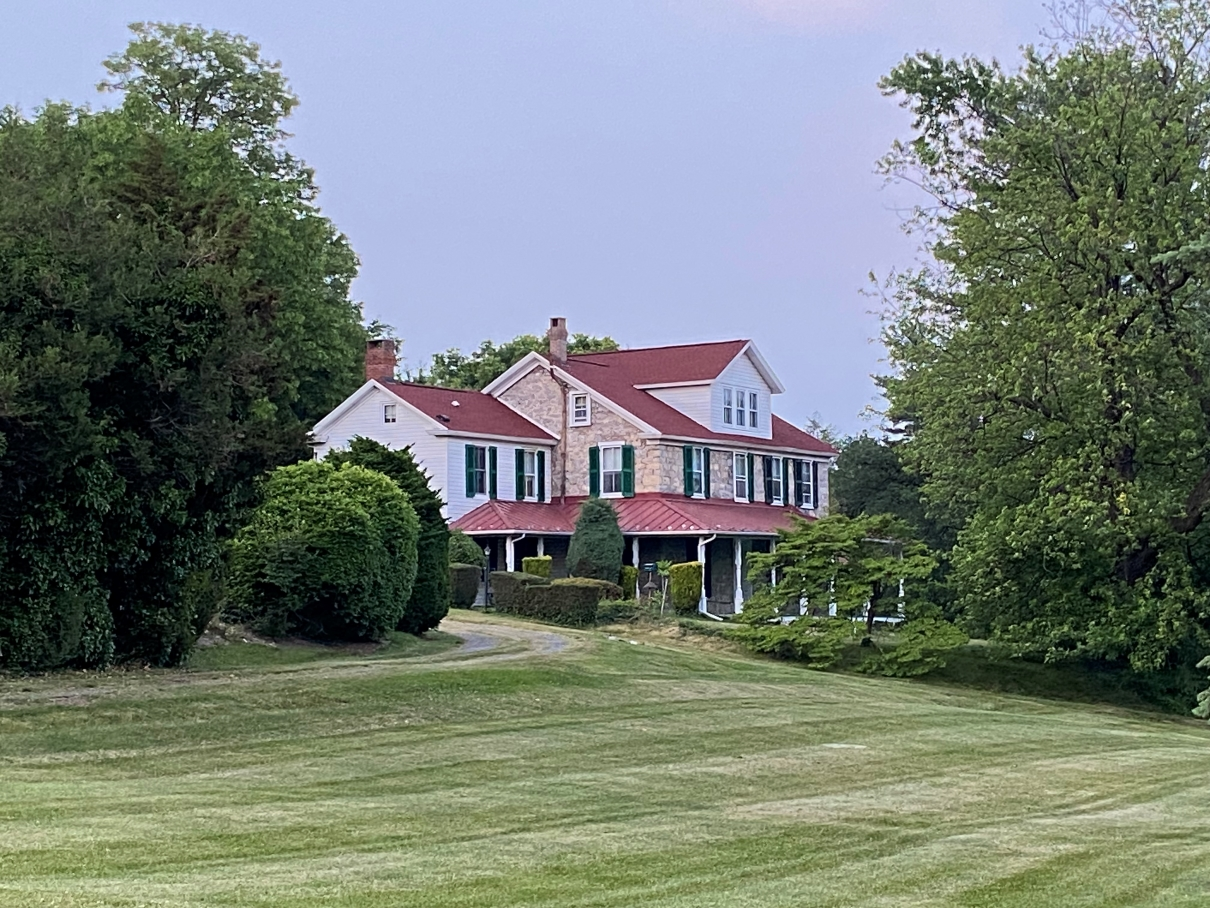
The historic Parson John Elder House, built 1740, at S. 24th Street & Ellerslie Street in East Harrisburg.

Elder was born in Edinburgh, the son of Robert and Eleanor Elder. He was raised and educated there, receiving a classical education at the University of Edinburgh and then he studied divinity, receiving a licence to preach the gospel in 1732. His father had emigrated to central Pennsylvania c. 1730, Elder followed c. 1735. A ministry opened when the Derry congregation split in two, and Elder was called and ordained by the Paxtang congregation.

The First Great Awakening had reached the area shortly afterwards. Elder opposed the revivalist furore. He was accused and formally cleared of heresy. He stood firmly with the "Old Side" in the resulting split amongst Presbyterian churches, which lasted about twenty years.

The French and Indian War led to conflict with local Indians. Elder organized a local militia known as the Paxton Boys. He and most male congregants brought their rifles to church. After the war was over, Elder was commissioned as a colonel. Killings of Indians continued, culminating in the "Conestoga Massacre". Elder, though he had attempted to prevent the attack, afterward excused the killings, refused to identify suspects, and was relieved of his command.

During the Revolution, he used his pulpit to round up volunteers, including two of his sons.

In his personal life, he married twice. He had 4 children by his first wife, and 11 children by his second wife, of whom 10 survived to adulthood. His son Thomas would become a prominent Harrisburg lawyer and businessman.
