= Forty Fort =

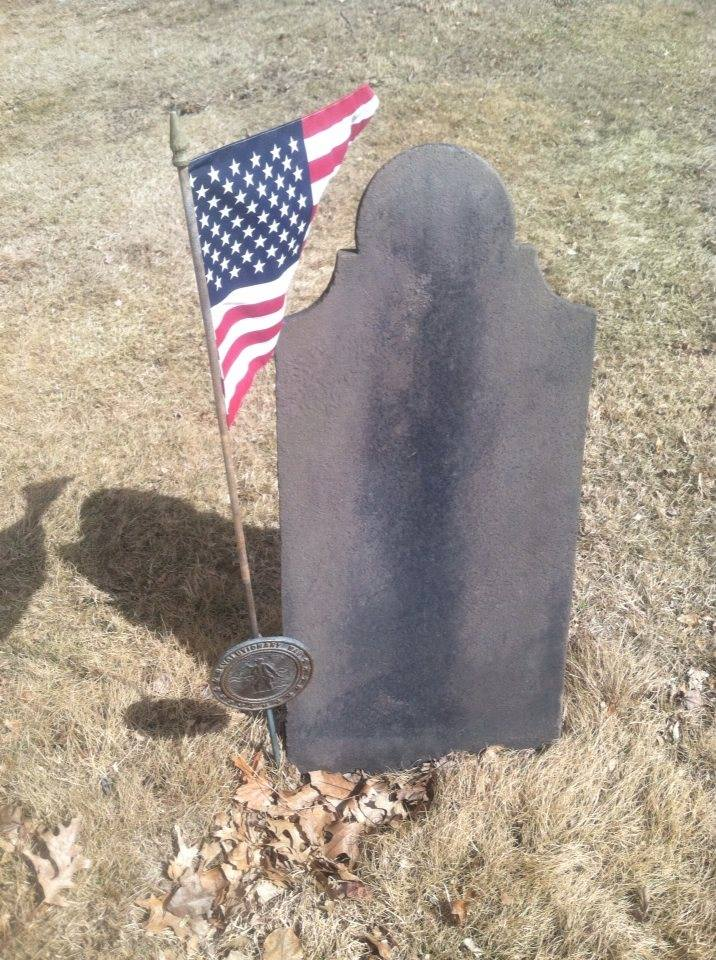
- A Revolutionary War grave from Forty Fort Cemetery.

- Location within Pennsylvania
- 41.28528°N 75.87304°W
- Location: US 11 (Wyoming Ave.) & River St., Forty Fort, Pennsylvania

History
- Built: 1770

Forty Fort was a stronghold built by settlers from Connecticut, on the Susquehanna River in what is now Luzerne County, Pennsylvania. Before the American Revolutionary War, both Connecticut and Pennsylvania claimed this territory, as Connecticut's colonial charter extended its land claims far to the west. These competing claims triggered the Pennamite–Yankee Wars but were resolved after the Revolutionary War when the federal government awarded the contested territory to Pennsylvania.

The fort was a refuge for settlers during the Battle of Wyoming on July 3, 1778. Lieutenant Colonel Zebulon Butler's force of largely militia soldiers was defeated by a force of Loyalist soldiers from Butler's Rangers and their Indigenous allies. Forty Fort capitulated the following day. The fort was reoccupied by the Americans later that year.

== Description ==
Forty Fort was located in the Wyoming Valley on the west bank of the Susquehanna River in what is now Forty Fort Borough in Luzerne County.

The fort is named for the forty families from Connecticut who arrived in the Wyoming Valley in 1769. Construction of the fort began in 1770, however, it fell into disrepair until rebuilt in 1777 during the Revolutionary War. The fort enclosed about an acre of ground. Barracks and other buildings were constructed along the double-thick, twelve-foot-high stockade wall. These provided shelter for the occupants and a firing platform for the garrison. The enclosure was rectangular in shape with gates in the north and south walls. Small sentry towers were constructed at the four corners of the fort.

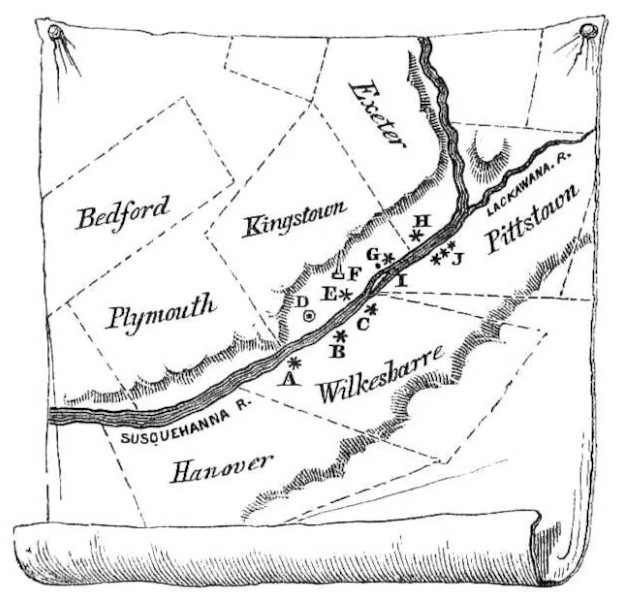
Forts in the Wyoming Valley. A-Fort Durkee, B-Fort Wyoming or Wilkesbarre, C-Fort Ogden, D-Kingston Village, E-Forty Fort, G-battleground, H-Fort Jenkins, I-Monocasy Island, J-Pittstown stockades, G-Queen Esther's Rock.

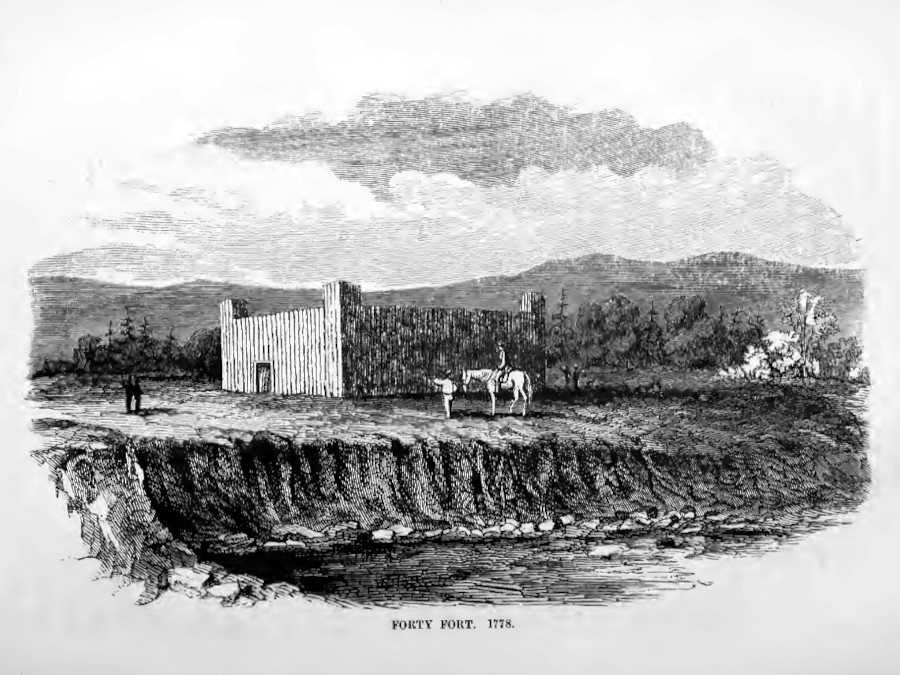
Artist's conception of Forty Fort in 1778
