= Battle of Wyoming =

1778 battle of the American Revolutionary War

Coordinates: 41°19′14″N 75°49′08″W

- Part of the American Revolutionary War
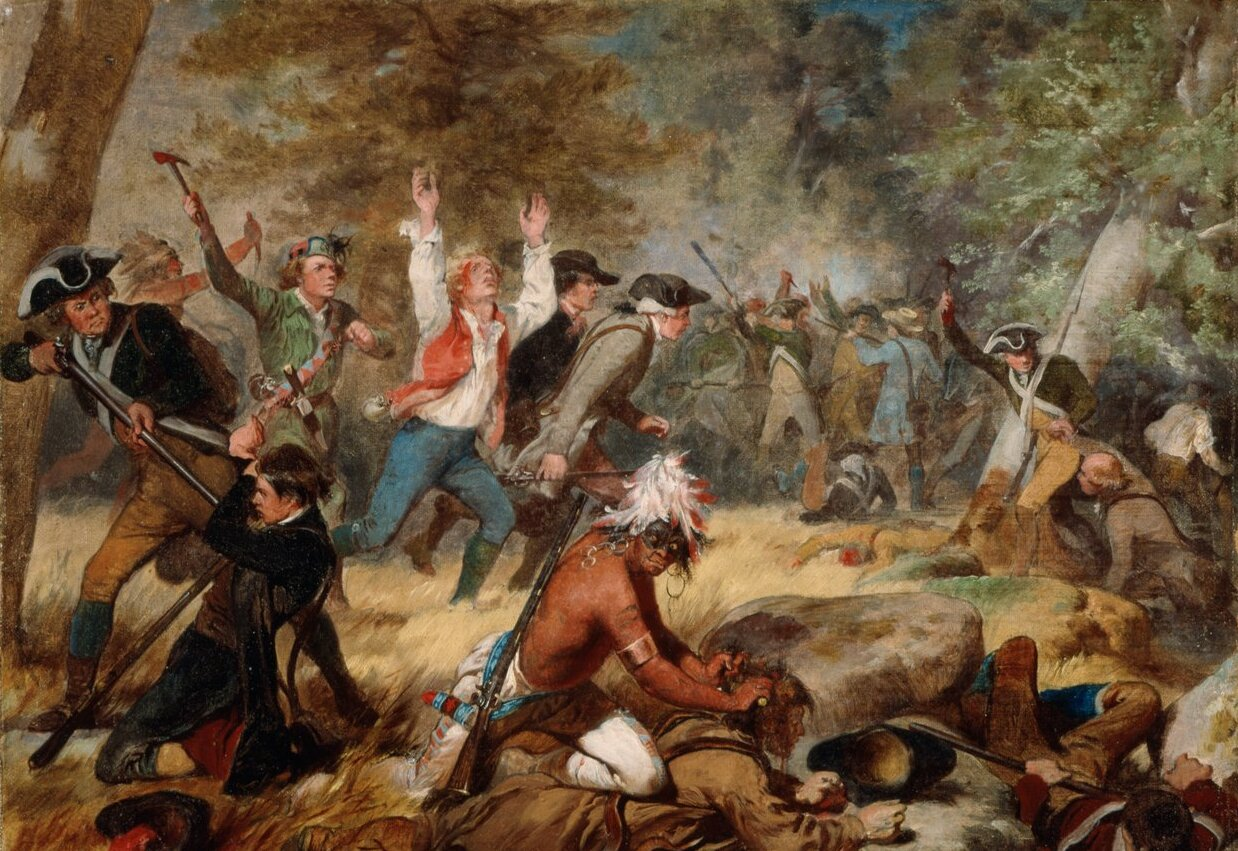
- Massacre of Wyoming (Pennsylvania), July 3-4, 1778; Alonzo Chappel, 1858
Date	July 3, 1778
Location	Wyoming Valley, Pennsylvania
Result	Loyalist-Haudenosaunee victory

Belligerents
Great Britain; Haudenosaunee	United States

Commanders and leaders
John Butler; Sayenqueraghta; Cornplanter	Zebulon Butler; Nathan Denison; George Dorrance†

Strength
110 provincials 464 Indigenous	360 regulars, militia and irregulars

Casualties and losses
3 killed 8 wounded	302 killed 5 captured

The Battle of Wyoming was a military engagement during the American Revolutionary War between Patriot militia and a force of Loyalist soldiers and Haudenosaunee warriors. The battle took place in the Wyoming Valley of Pennsylvania on July 3, 1778, in what is now Luzerne County. The result was an overwhelming defeat for the Patriots. The battle is often referred to as the Wyoming Massacre because of the roughly 300 Patriot casualties, many of whom were killed by the Haudenosaunee as they fled the battlefield or after they had been taken prisoner.

Widespread looting and burning of buildings occurred throughout the Wyoming Valley subsequent to the battle, but non-combatants were not harmed. Most of the inhabitants fled across the Pocono Mountains to Stroudsburg and Easton or down the Susquehanna River to Sunbury. Within weeks, a widely distributed but highly inaccurate newspaper report claimed that hundreds of women and children had been massacred. This false version of events was accepted as proven fact by many writers for decades afterwards but has been thoroughly discredited.

== Background ==
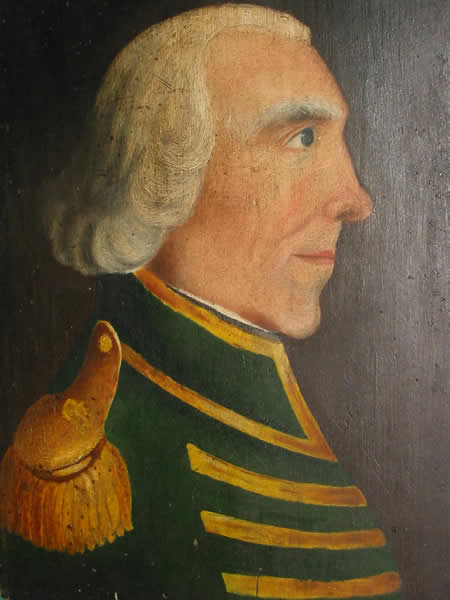
Loyalist commander John Butler

In 1777, British general John Burgoyne tried to gain control of the Hudson River valley during the American Revolutionary War, but was forced to surrender after the Battles of Saratoga in October. News of the surrender prompted France to enter the war as an American ally. British military officials were concerned that the French might attempt to retake parts of Canada which they had lost in the French and Indian War, so they adopted a more defensive strategy in Quebec.

The British recruited Loyalists and Indigenous allies to conduct a frontier war along the northern and western borders of the Thirteen Colonies. British Indian Department officer John Butler was granted permission to enlist Loyalists in a regiment that came be to known as Butler's Rangers. Seneca chiefs Sayenqueraghta and Cornplanter encouraged Seneca and Cayuga warriors to participate in raids against frontier settlements. Similarly, Mohawk war leader Joseph Brant encouraged Mohawk participation and recruited Loyalist volunteers to fight with him. By April 1778, the Seneca were raiding settlements along the Allegheny River and the West Branch of the Susquehanna River. In late May, Joseph Brant raided Cobleskill in Tryon County, New York.

In early June, Butler, Sayenqueraghta, and Brant met at Tioga Point at the confluence of the Chemung River and the North Branch of the Susquehanna River. Although Butler and the Haudenosaunee were planning a major attack on the Wyoming Valley, it was agreed that Brant would return to Onaquaga and prepare to raid settlements in New York.

== Battle ==
Major Butler with 110 Butler's Rangers and 464 Indigenous warriors departed Tioga Point on June 27, and arrived at the head of the Wyoming Valley three days later. Most of the Indigenous warriors were Seneca and Cayuga led by Sayenqueraghta, Cornplanter, and Fish Carrier, but contingents of Lenape (Delaware), Onondaga, and Tuscarora were also present. The Americans were alerted to their approach when 12 settlers working in a field and nearby tannery were attacked.

The inhabitants fled to the forts scattered throughout the Wyoming Valley including Fort Wyoming (Wilkes-Barre) and Fort Pittston. Meanwhile, the Patriot militia assembled at Forty Fort under the command of Lieutenant Colonel Zebulon Butler, an officer of the Continental Army home on leave.

On July 1, Fort Wintermoot at the north end of the valley surrendered without a shot being fired. That evening Fort Jenkins also surrendered after a brief skirmish. The terms of the surrender for both forts promised that the inhabitants would not be harmed.

Demands for Forty Fort to surrender were rebuked. Lieutenant Colonel Butler and his senior officers, Colonel Nathan Denison and Lieutenant Colonel George Dorrance, advocated remaining in the fort, however, their subordinates, led by Lazarus Stewart, were overwhelmingly in favor of marching out to meet the enemy. Butler gave in and by mid-afternoon on July 3, a force of roughly 375 men, organized into five companies of militia and one company of Continentals, sallied from the fort.

Every movement by the Americans was observed by Indigenous scouts. Major Butler ordered Fort Wintermoot burned in order to trick the Americans into thinking that he was withdrawing. Butler positioned his forces in a "fine open wood" with the Rangers on the left and his Indigenous allies on the right. He ordered his men to lie on the ground and wait for the order to fire.

The Americans deployed into a line of battle as they approached Fort Wintermoot. After firing three unanswered volleys they had advanced to within 100 yards of Major Butler's position, unaware that they were being flanked by the Seneca and Cayuga. Following a devastating volley from the Rangers and their Indigenous allies, the Seneca and Cayuga broke cover and attacked the Americans with maul, tomahawk and spear.

The battle lasted about 30 minutes. An attempt to reform the American line quickly turned into a frantic rout, as the inexperienced militiamen panicked and ran. It became a deadly race from which only about 60 escaped including Lieutenant Colonel Butler and Colonel Denison. Many of those overtaken by the Seneca and Cayuga were killed and scalped immediately, however, some were taken captive and were later tortured and executed.

In his report to the commanding officer of Fort Niagara, Major Butler stated that his Indigenous allies had taken 227 scalps and five prisoners, while Colonel Denison informed him that 302 had been killed.

== Aftermath ==
Lieutenant Colonel Butler and the surviving Continental soldiers left the Wyoming Valley on the morning of July 4 rather than being taken as prisoners of war. That afternoon, Colonel Denison surrendered Forty Fort along with what remained of the militia. Major Butler paroled them on their promise to take no part in further hostilities, and gave his assurance that "the lives of the inhabitants [would be] preserved entire and unharmed."

None of the valley's inhabitants were killed after the capitulation, but many did have their personal effects plundered by Butler's Indigenous allies. In the days that followed, houses and barns throughout the Wyoming Valley were looted and burned. Mills were destroyed and livestock was driven off. The inhabitants of the valley fled, either east through the Great Swamp and the Pocono Mountains to Fort Penn (Stroudsburg) or Easton, or by rafting down the Susquehanna to Fort Augusta (Sunbury).

In his report, Major Butler wrote:

But what gives me the sincerest satisfaction is that I can, with great truth, assure you that in the destruction of the settlement not a single person was hurt except such as were in arms, to these, in truth, the Indians gave no quarter.

J. Hector St. John de Crèvecœur, who was in the Wyoming Valley a few weeks after the battle, wrote: "Happily these fierce people, satisfied with the death of those who had opposed them in arms, treated the defenceless ones, the woman and children, with a degree of humanity almost hitherto unparalleled".

At the time of the battle a company of militia led by Captain Jeremiah Blanchard and Lieutenant Timothy Keyes held Pittston Fort, on the east side of the Susquehanna River several miles upstream from Forty Fort. The fort was surrendered on July 4, 1778, one day after the battle, and was partially burned a few days later. Pittston Fort was reoccupied, restored and strengthened in 1780. It remained in use until after the end of the war.

According to one source, Lieutenant Colonel George Dorrance was captured in the battle. Since he was an officer of prominence, dressed in a new uniform, with new sword and equipment, he had been spared death under the belief that more could be obtained for his ransom than could be made from his slaughter. On the morning of the 4th, his captors were escorting Dorrance to Forty Fort when he became exhausted and was unable to proceed farther. His captors killed him, one taking his scalp and sword, the other his coat and tricorne. They later went through the fort showing off this clothing and took particular pains to exhibit themselves to Mrs. Dorrance, "who sat grieving over the fate of her husband."

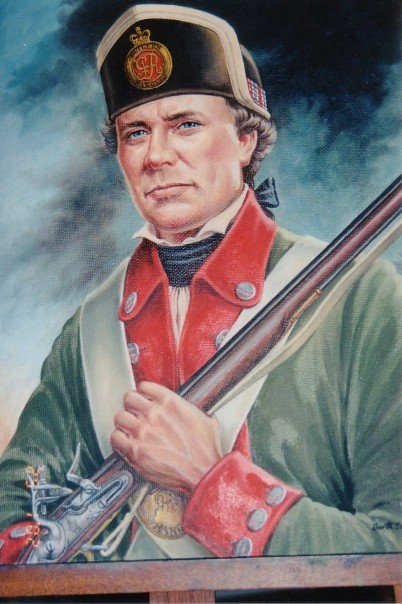
A painting by artist Garth Dittrick of a member of Butler's Rangers

Major Butler reported "one Indian killed, two Rangers and eight Indians wounded." He claimed that his force had burned 1,000 houses, and drove off 1,000 cattle as well as many sheep and hogs. Richard Cartwright, Major Butler's civilian secretary, recorded in his journal: "seven wounded, two of who died of their wounds."

Butler and his forces departed the valley on July 8, and returned to Tioga Point. Later that month Butler returned to Fort Niagara while the Rangers, under the command of Captain William Caldwell proceeded to Onaquaga.

In the aftermath of the battle, the settlers who had fled the Wyoming Valley spread harrowing stories and rumors about the American defeat that contributed to a general panic across the frontiers of New York and Pennsylvania. Some American newspapers picked up on these stories and went even further, producing unsubstantiated accounts about the burning of women, children, and wounded soldiers inside Forty Fort on the day after the battle. The American public was outraged by such reports of a massacre and other atrocities. Many saw it as just one more reason to support American independence.

In early August 1778, Lieutenant Colonel Butler returned to the Wyoming Valley with the Westmoreland Independent Company and a company of militia. In late August they were joined by a detachment from Hartley's Additional Continental Regiment. Some of the settlers who had fled in early July also began to return.

In September the Westmoreland Independent Company and Hartley's Additional Continental Regiment participated in a counter-raid commanded by Colonel Thomas Hartley that destroyed a number of abandoned Delaware villages in the vicinity of Tioga Point. Afterwards the Independent Company and a company of Hartley's Regiment garrisoned the rebuilt Fort Wyoming (Wilkes-Barre).

In October 1778, a burial party recovered the scattered remains of the fallen. According to one source, 60 Patriot bodies were found on the battlefield and another 36 along the line of retreat. Years later they were exhumed and reburied in a common grave when the Wyoming Monument was built.

The Seneca were angered by the accusations of atrocities following the Battle of Wyoming. Coupled with anger at militiamen who ignored their paroles, such accusations led the Seneca to attack civilians at Cherry Valley in November 1778. The Battle of Wyoming and the Cherry Valley Massacre encouraged American military leaders to strike back against the Haudenosaunee. In the late summer of 1779, the Sullivan Expedition, commissioned by General George Washington, methodically destroyed 40 Haudenosaunee villages and an enormous quantity of stored corn and vegetables throughout the Finger Lakes region. The Haudenosaunee struggled to recover from the damage inflicted by Sullivan's soldiers, and many died of starvation that winter, but they continued to raid frontier settlements until the end of the war.

== Legacy ==
The Battle of Wyoming remained well-known to most Americans for the rest of the eighteenth century and for most of the nineteenth. It particularly reemerged in national discourse during the War of 1812 when Americans again found themselves fighting the British and their Indigenous allies on the frontier. Some newspaper accounts readily compared the Battle of Frenchtown (also known as the River Raisin Massacre) in 1813 to the Wyoming Massacre.

The "Wyoming Massacre" was described by the Scottish poet Thomas Campbell in his 1809 poem "Gertrude of Wyoming". Campbell depicted Mohawk war leader Joseph Brant as a "monster" in the poem, even though Brant was at Onaquaga on the day of the attack.

The western state of Wyoming is named after the Wyoming Valley. The state received its name from the United States Congress when the Wyoming Territory was created in 1868.

Construction of a monument to commemorate the battle began in 1833 but took a decade to complete due to a lack of funds. The 19 meter (63 ft) tall obelisk is the site of a common grave containing the remains of many of the victims of the battle. The names of 176 of the slain are inscribed on the monument.

The Battle of Wyoming is commemorated each year by the Wyoming Commemorative Association, a local non-profit organization, which holds an annual ceremony on the grounds of the Wyoming Monument. The commemorative ceremonies began in 1878 to mark the 100th anniversary of the battle and massacre. The principal speaker at the event was President Rutherford B. Hayes. During the 100th anniversary commemoration, the people of Wyoming Valley used the motto "An honest tale speeds best when plainly told" in an effort to promote the historical account of the battle. The annual program has continued each year since then.

== Gallery ==
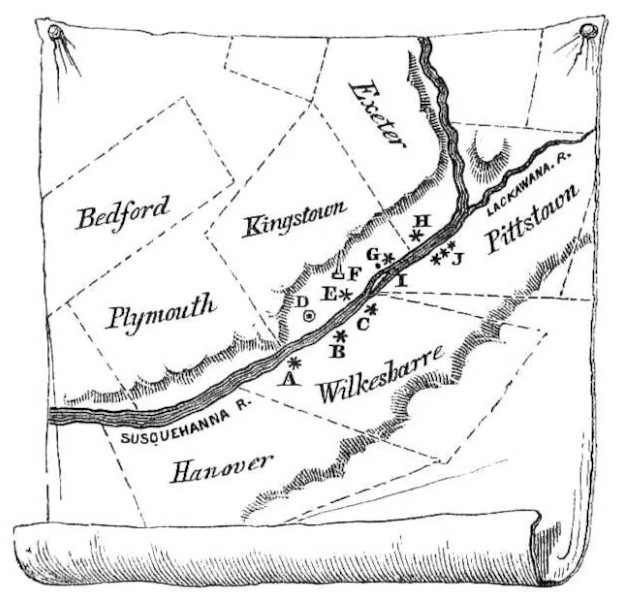
Wyoming Valley Forts: A-Fort Durkee, B-Fort Wyoming or Wilkesbarre, C-Fort Ogden, D-Kingston Village, E-Forty Fort, G-Battleground, H-Fort Jenkins, I-Monocasy Island, J-Pittstown stockades, G-Queen Esther's Rock

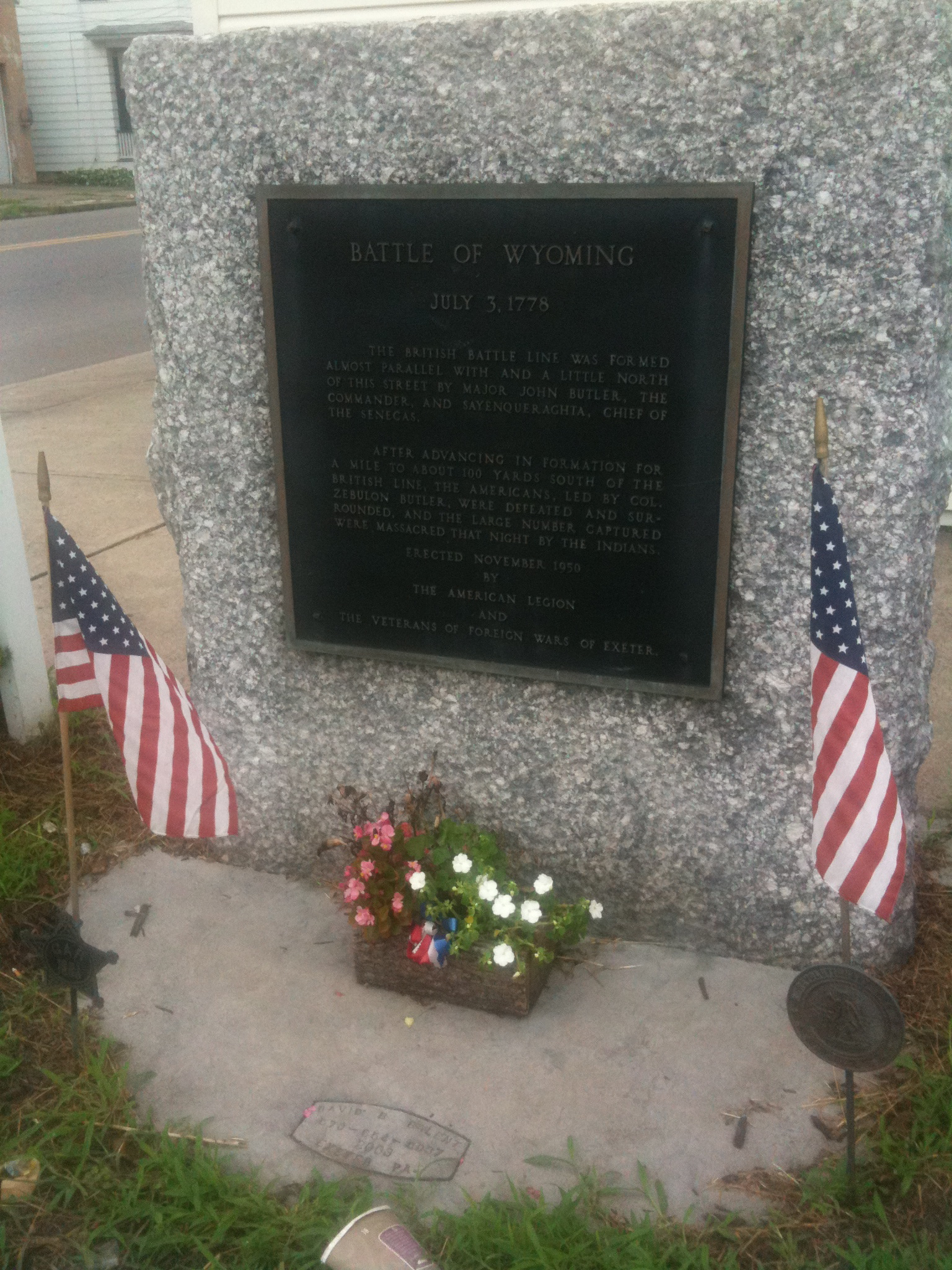
Battle of Wyoming Marker

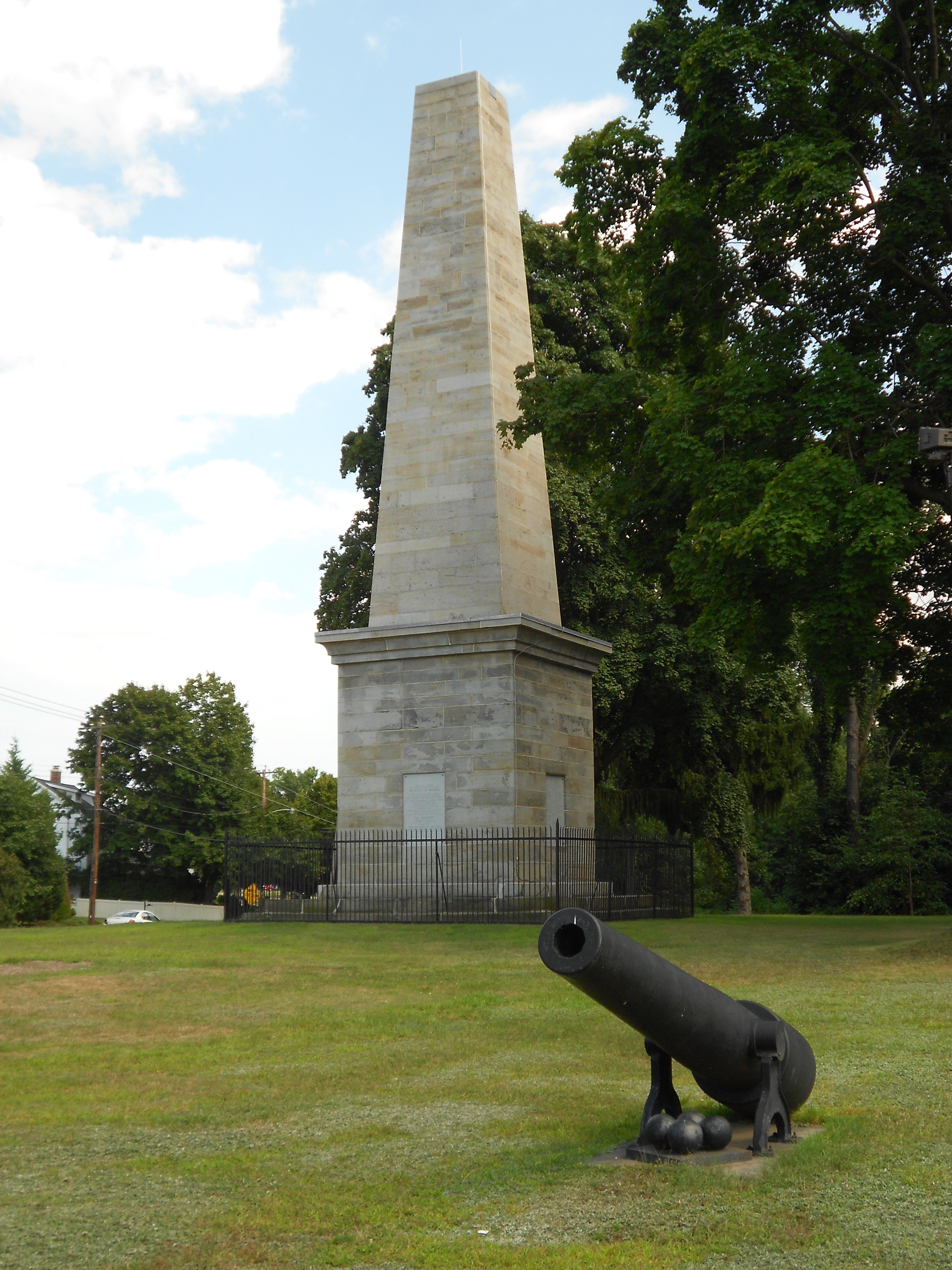
The Wyoming Monument

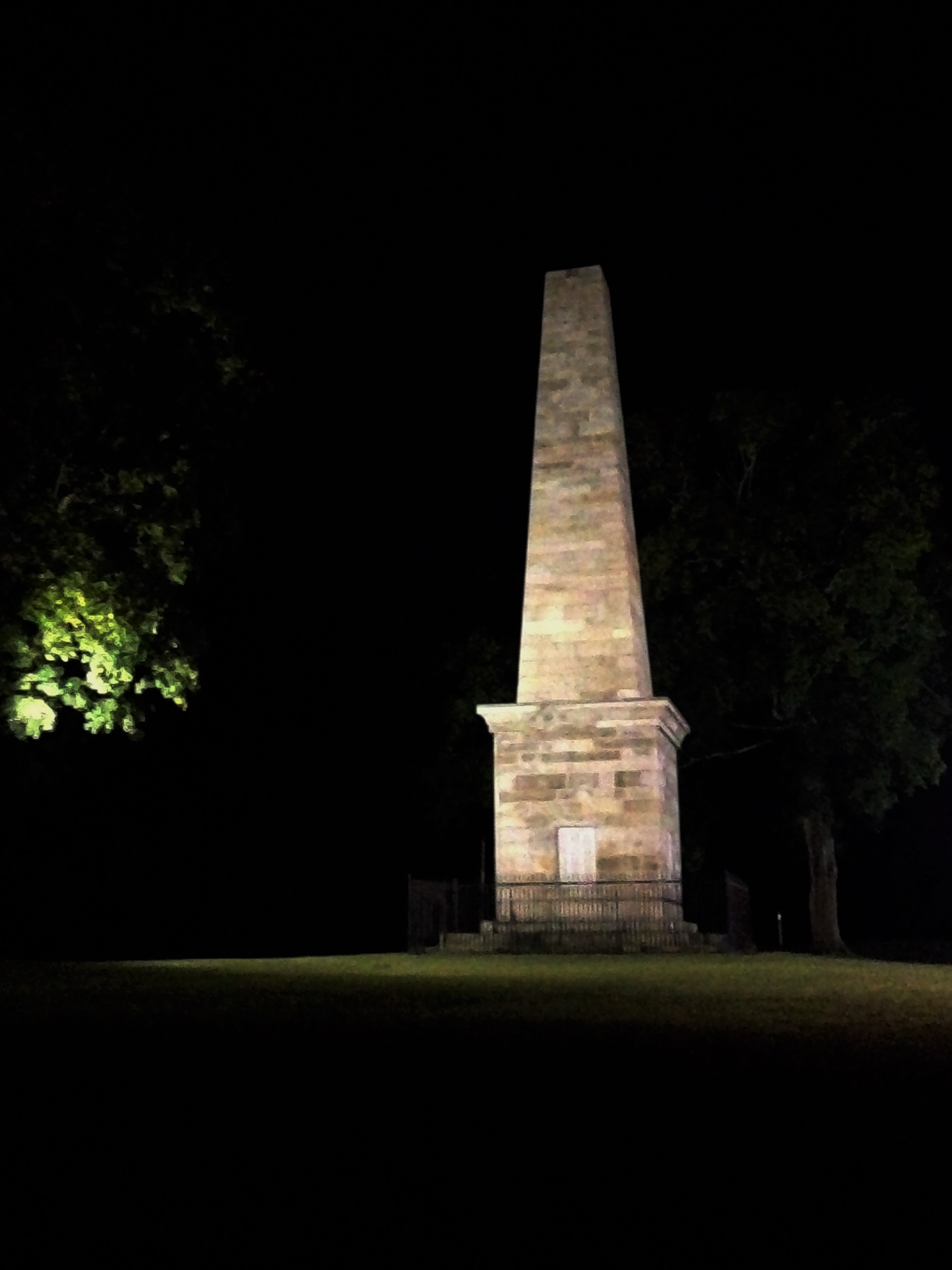
The monument at night

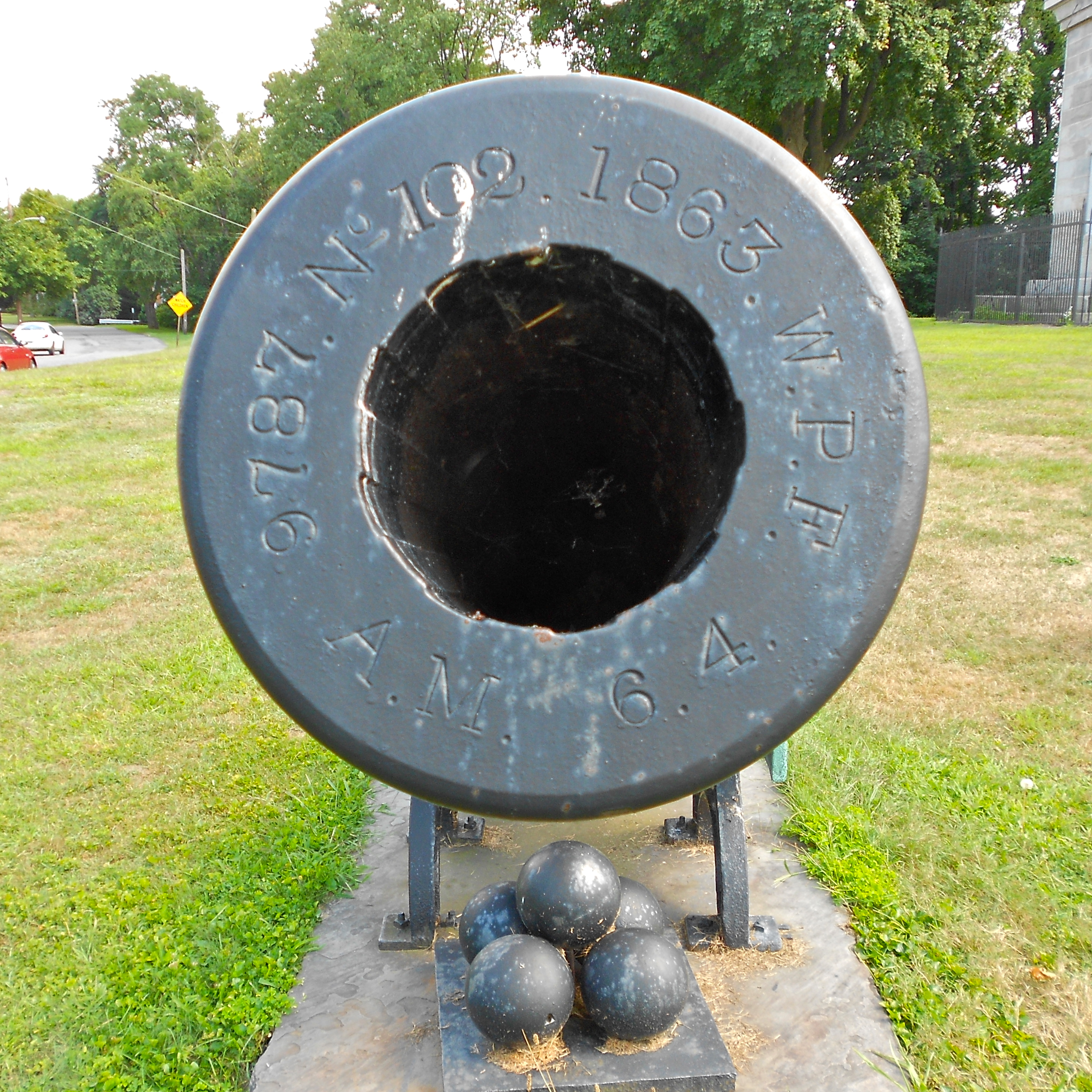
Mouth of one of the cannons at the monument

== American order of battle ==
Officer Commanding (Lieutenant Colonel Zebulon Butler)

Continental Army

- Hewitt's Company (Captain Detrick Hewitt †) [46 officers and men.]

24th Regiment of Connecticut Militia (Colonel Nathan Denison, Lieutenant Colonel George Dorrance †)

- Shawnee Company (Captain Asaph Whittlesey †) [40 officers and men]
- Hanover Company (Captain Wm McKarrchen † Captain Lazarus Stewart †[30 officers and men]
- Lower Wilkes-Barre Company (Captain James Bidlack Jr. †) [38 officers and men]
- Upper Wilkes-Barre Company (Captain Rezin Geer †) [30 officers and men]
- Kingston Company (Captain Aholiab Buck †) [40 officers and men]
- Detachment of the Huntington and Salem Company (Lieutenant Stoddard Brown)

Supernumeraries

- Captain Robert Durkee †
- Captain Samuel Ransom †
- Lieutenant Peren Ross †
- Lieutenant James Wells †
- Lieutenant Timothy Pierce †
- Ensign Matthias Hollenback
- Gershom Prince †

Notes

- Captain Robert Durkee, Captain Samuel Ransom, Lieutenant James Wells and Lieutenant Peren Ross of the Independent Westmoreland Companies resigned their commissions in late June 1778 and along with about 25 enlisted men joined Lieutenant Colonel Butler at Forty Fort in time for the battle.
- The remainder of the two Independent Westmoreland Companies were merged in a single unit commanded by Captain Simon Spalding. They were subsequently ordered to the Wyoming Valley but were many miles away when the battle occurred.
- The Pittston Company commanded by Captain Jeremiah Blanchard remained at Pittston Fort and did not join Lieutenant Colonel Butler at Forty Fort.
- Most of the Huntington and Salem Company commanded by Captain John Franklin did not reach Forty Fort until after the battle.
- The 1st Alarm Company (Captain James Bidlack Sr.) and the 2nd Alarm Company (Dr. William Hooker Smith) garrisoned Wilkes-Barre and other smaller forts during the battle, however, several members of these two companies marched with the rest of the militia.
- Gershom Prince was likely a free black in the employ of Captain Durkee.
- According to one source there were also roughly 100 men who participated in the battle but were not enrolled in the militia
