= Zebulon Butler =

American military officer and politician (1731-1795)

- Born: January 23, 1731; Ipswich, Massachusetts, British America
- Died: July 28, 1795 (aged 64); Wilkes-Barre, Pennsylvania, U.S.
- Burial place: Hollenback Cemetery, Wilkes-Barre, Pennsylvania, U.S.
- Spouses: Anna Lord (1736-1773) m. 1760; Lydia Johnson (1756-1781) m. 1776; Phebe Haight (1756-1832) m. 1783
- Military career
- Conflicts: French and Indian War; Anglo-Spanish War; Battle of Havana; American Revolutionary War; Battle of Wyoming

Zebulon Butler (January 23, 1731 – July 28, 1795) was an American military officer and politician from Connecticut who served with the Continental Army during the Revolutionary War. He represented the Wyoming Valley (now in northeast Pennsylvania) in the Connecticut Assembly. At the time, the territory was claimed both by Connecticut (which claimed a wide swath of land to the west) and by Pennsylvania, and was nominally under the former's jurisdiction.

== Early life ==
Zebulon Butler was born in Ipswich, Massachusetts on January 23, 1731 and grew up in Lyme, Connecticut.

== French and Indian War ==
In 1755, the military forces of the Thirteen Colonies were mustered after the outbreak of the French and Indian War. During this period, Butler was commissioned as an ensign in the 3rd Connecticut Regiment, a provincial infantry unit, serving under Captain Andrew Ward. The regiment was stationed at Fort William Henry in 1756. On May 27, 1758, Butler, now serving in the 9th company of the 4th Connecticut Regiment, was promoted to the rank of lieutenant while stationed at Fort Edward in Nova Scotia. He subsequently took part in the Battle of Carillon on July 8. On October 4, he participated in a scouting mission to Fort Carillon and Fort Saint-Frédéric. In March 1759, he was promoted to the rank of captain of his company and participated in a successful attack on Crown Point.

== Revolutionary War ==
On January 1, 1777, Butler was commissioned as lieutenant colonel of the 3rd Connecticut Regiment of the Continental Army. He commanded the garrison of Forty Fort in the Wyoming Valley of Pennsylvania. His most famous action was the Battle of Wyoming, which resulted in his defeat by British-allied forces; he lost 340 men while attacking a superior force estimated at 574 Loyalists and Iroquois under the command of Loyalist Colonel John Butler (no relation). He was an original member of The Society of the Cincinnati in the State of Connecticut.

== Notes ==
- Fredriksen, John (2006). Revolutionary War Almanac. Infobase Publishing. ISBN 9780816074686.
- Kulp, George, ed. (1884). "Edmund Griffin Butler". The Luzerne Legal Register. Vol. XII, no. 36. Wilkes-Barre, Pennsylvania: E. B. Yodry. pp. 295–319. OCLC 263683250.
