= Newington-Cropsey Foundation =

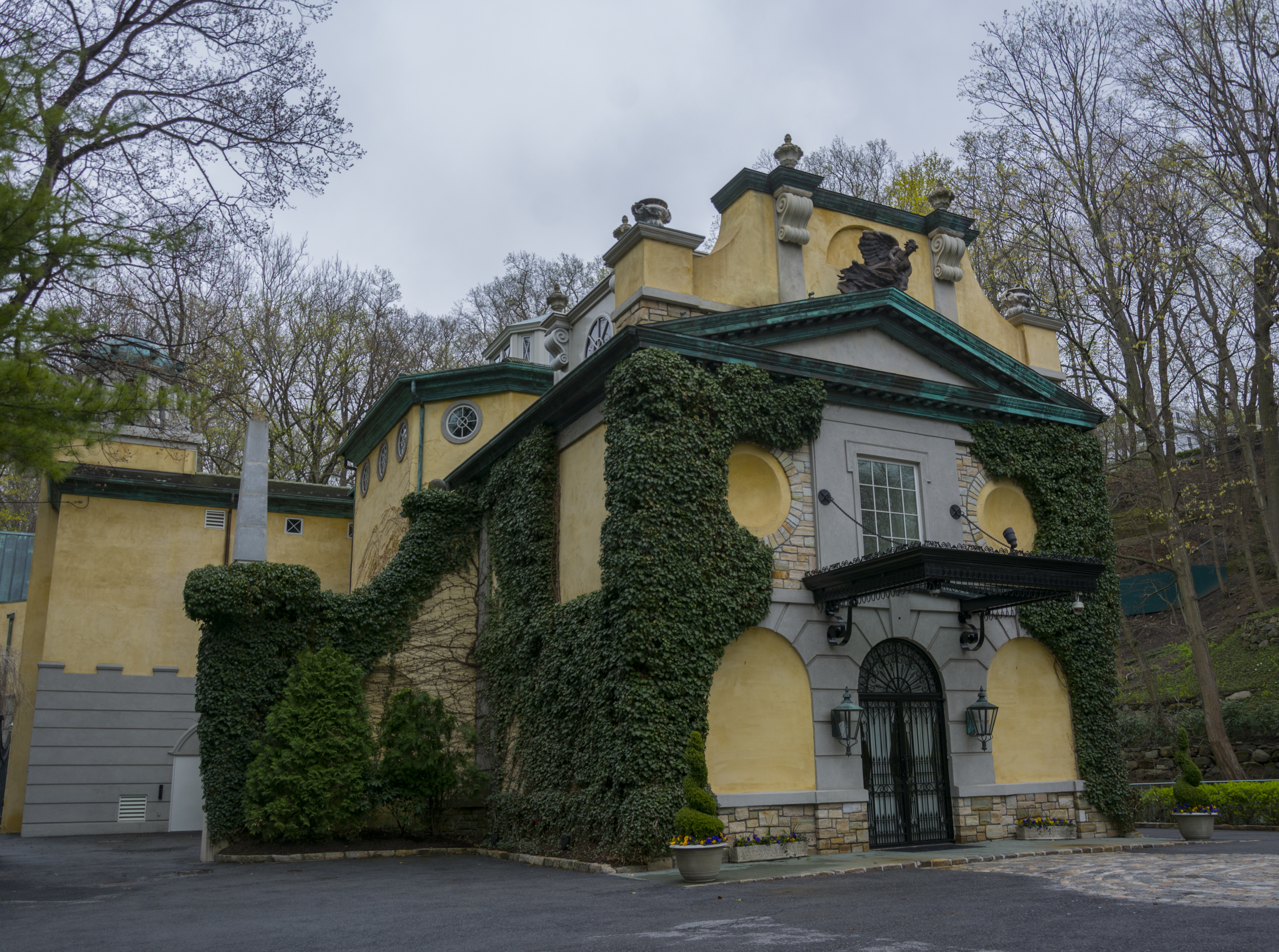
- NCF Gallery of Art
- Interactive map of the foundation's Gallery of Art and Ever Rest
- Formation: 1977; 49 years ago
- Headquarters: 25 Cropsey Lane, Hastings-on-Hudson, NY 10706
- Chairman: Barbara Newington
- Key people: Adelia Rasines, Executive Director
- Website: Official website

The Newington-Cropsey Foundation (NCF) is a nonprofit private organization based in Hastings-on-Hudson, New York. The foundation's aim is to maintain and preserve the works of Jasper Cropsey and the art movement he was a part of, the Hudson River School. The foundation also promotes representational painting and sculpture.

The organization was founded in 1977 by Barbara and John Newington to collect and promote works of Barbara's great-grandfather Jasper Cropsey, as well as other non-abstract art.

The NCF offers free tours of its properties: Ever Rest, the last home and studio of Jasper Cropsey, and the Gallery of Art Building, a museum dedicated to the works of Cropsey. The properties are adjacent to each other in the village of Hastings-on-Hudson.

== Organization ==
The foundation's stated aim is to preserve the moral, artistic and religious values of Jasper Cropsey and the Hudson River School, as well as to "recapture a little sense of stability, security and beauty that was so much a part of the 19th century". The foundation also promotes representational painting and sculpture. The foundation does not seek publicity, intending to stay less noticed by the general public. Other than including listings in local guidebooks, the NCF has no marketing.

The nonprofit organization is privately owned. The current chairman is Barbara Newington, the executive director is Adelia C. Rasines, and the foundation's director is Anthony Speiser; all three also act as trustees. The organization provides grants to representational artists and classes to sculptors of classical works; it also publishes American Arts Quarterly, a journal for non-abstract art.

The NCF maintains a large collection of Cropsey's paintings: about 100 oil and 30 watercolor paintings. It is seen as the leading authority on Cropsey paintings.

== History ==
=== Establishment ===
After Jasper Cropsey's death in 1900, his wife Maria Cropsey still lived in Ever Rest, until her death in 1906. Jasper Cropsey's granddaughter Isabel subsequently inherited the property and began buying back some of Cropsey's paintings. Isabel and her husband William Steinschneider lived there, raising their daughter Barbara in the house. William was a six-term mayor of Hastings. Isabel died in 1958 and William in 1970, making William the last to live in the house; Barbara inherited it. Their daughter, married as Barbara Newington, aggressively pursued Cropsey's paintings alongside her husband John until about the 1980s, while Cropsey paintings were still inexpensive. Barbara and John Newington created the Newington-Cropsey Foundation and its properties in 1977 with concern over the state of modern art and "the way culture was going".

Newington, today the foundation's chairman, is a philanthropist living in Greenwich, Connecticut and is the great-granddaughter of Cropsey.

Around 1977, the foundation traded land with the village of Hastings, giving the village land and $400,000 for a garage for its department of public works. In turn, the NCF acquired a 6-acre (2.4 ha) parcel of land and the village's existing public works garage, on a site that was formerly the town dump for decades, and was called Frog Hollow around Cropsey's time. The NCF's initial plans were to renovate the garage, landscape the property, restore the pond, and construct steps to connect the property to Ever Rest, in total "to make [the property] look like a Cropsey painting".

In 1979, the NCF was among several museums and private collectors that lent items to "An Unprejudiced Eye", an exhibit of Cropsey's works. The exhibit was at the Hudson River Museum and was created by the village of Hastings, marking its association with Cropsey and its 100th anniversary. NCF art historian Kenneth Maddox organized and curated the exhibit.

In April 1988, the New York State Department of Environmental Conservation cleaned up oil from Sugar Pond, a small pond on the property. The department approved the project and its environmental assessment report.

Beginning in the late 1980s, the NCF contracted the construction of an intricately landscaped 19th-century arts complex with three buildings, a pond, and a garden, designed by Peter Gisolfi Associates of Hastings. The first building, the New Studio, opened in 1990 with an exhibition of paintings by Hudson River School artist Worthington Whittredge. The site was also slated to include a gatekeeper's cottage, a library and administration center, an outdoor amphitheater, as well as a 10,000-square-foot (930 m^{2}) museum, which was to be completed in 1992.

During the initial planning phase for the complex, the village's historical society intervened, expressing curiosity over possible remains in the ravine. The society urged the village's planning board to put a hold on construction so the New York State Office of Parks, Recreation and Historic Preservation could make preliminary tests in the ravine. The historical society president described the site as "our village's cradle of civilization – where our early industry started"; another member of the society expressed that the site was "the least-disturbed 19th-century industrial site in Westchester County". The executive director of the Westchester County Historical Society (a former president of the Hastings Historical Society) supported an archaeological study, and described that the site was previously the confluence of two streams where three early mills operated, including a bone mill and brass and iron-turning factory. Since then, the site was home to the Hastings Pavement and Brick factory, the Cottlet Hotel, and a Hastings Department of Public Works building. The public works building's foundation still remained, and the NCF had planned to build on top of it. The NCF was opposed to archaeological studies as it would require dynamiting the foundation and would disturb the fragile site, including a 125-year-old retaining wall. Greg Wyatt, director of the project, was concerned delays would lead to costs excessive of their $2.7 million budget. The construction was approved pending the archaeological study, paid for by the NCF and directed by a state-approved archaeologist with a specialty in early industry.

Barbara Newington was considered a friend of the Hastings Historical Society, and had given the organization its first substantial home. The NCF gave them a $42,000 grant and a 5-year $1 lease to a cottage next to Ever Rest, which the historical society used until its relocation to its current home, the Henry Draper Observatory.

The Gallery of Art opened on October 16, 1994.

=== Garden of Great Ideas ===
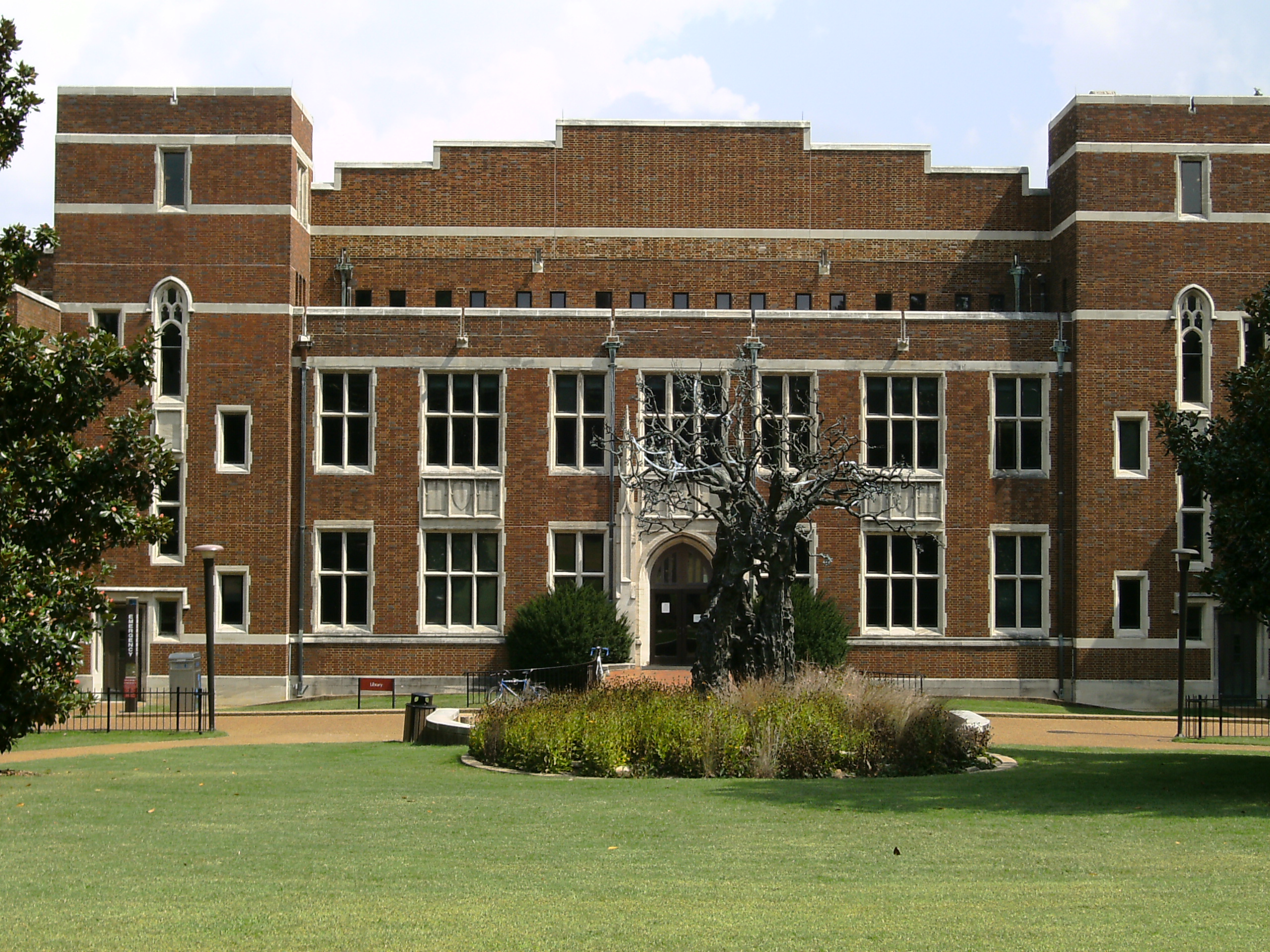
Tree of Learning by Greg Wyatt, in front of Vanderbilt University's Central Library

Beginning in May 1997, the foundation partnered with Vanderbilt University to create a sculpture garden on the university campus, to be known as the "Garden of Great Ideas". Then-US Republican Senator Fred Thompson brought the idea of the sculpture garden to the university's chancellor Joe B. Wyatt, who visited the NCF and decided to partner with the organization.

Students of the NCF's Academy of Art, including six young artists, would create the bronze sculptures. The NCF's goal was the placement of many sculptures on numerous college campuses as a link between scholarship and artistry. By 1997, the NCF had already donated Bill of Rights Eagle, a sculpture by NCF Academy of Art Director Greg Wyatt to the college. The NCF planned to donate 15 to 20 additional bronze sculptures by the students for permanent exhibition, added over the following three to five years. The final piece would also be by Wyatt, a sculpture named Tree of Knowledge placed in front of the Jean and Alexander Heard Library.

The art program had numerous criticisms. The university's art community and faculty were largely not consulted on the decision. One professor at the school expressed dismay that the "program is nowhere near the avant-garde of our own age", and that the sculptures were placed in so many areas of the campus that it could impede other gifts or exhibitions on campus. An art professor found the sculptures to not achieve the school's goals of quality and diversity, noting one material, one presentation, and generic ideas symbolized by the works. As well, no Vanderbilt students were among the student artists.

Tree of Learning provoked the most opposition from professors, seen as a "boring and unchallenging" reproduction of a barren or burnt dead tree. Judson Newbern, associate vice chancellor of the college, admitted the tree looks dead, and requested Wyatt weld leaves and buds onto his work. Newbern did defend the program overall, and noted that the student artists are diverse in ethnicity and gender.

A committee of professors was not created to approve this project as the vice chancellor did not want the project to be a missed opportunity if obstacles came up. It was noted that the NCF appeared right-leaning, with stated goals to "advance and promote the values inherent in the 19th century...including the belief that God created nature". The NCF also promotes "strong national pride in America". Professor Cecilia Tichi was against the works for their values, in believing that campuses are a place to stretch people's minds.

=== Further history ===
Sculptor Joseph Petrovics, who sculpted the National Iwo Jima Memorial and the FDNY memorial wall, was a Studio Instructor at the Newington-Cropsey Foundation Academy of Art beginning in 1993.

From 1994 until about 2005, the NCF hosted the Hudson Valley Art Association's Annual Exhibition; Newington and the foundation had been long-time supporters of the association, which was established by a small group of artists who first met at Ever Rest in 1928.

In 2006, the NCF spent $500,000 to create a Christian docudrama Lost Letters of Faith, a story about King Abgar of Edessa. The foundation filmed the production at Regent University. Terry Lindvall, a film and religious studies scholar and a former president of Regent University, assembled filmmakers for the drama. Another of their film projects, called Cradle of Genius, focused on divine inspiration and the composers Brahms, Puccini, and Richard Strauss. It was based on Arthur Abell's Talks with Great Composers.

From 2015 to 2017, Greg Wyatt installed a series of busts at the Boscobel House and Gardens in Garrison, New York. Adjacent to the house, the property contains a permanent sculpture garden with ten bronze busts of significant Hudson River School artists. The sculptures are by Wyatt and were donated by the Newington-Cropsey Foundation. Boscobel was chosen to house the works because of its location in the Hudson Highlands, which was a popular subject of the school's painters, and because the area roughly lies in the geographic center of Hudson River School artist homes and the landscapes that they painted. The busts include a biography of each artist, on the back of each sculpture, and the works also combine elements of the Hudson River School artists' paintings into them. The garden opened with three works in late 2015, and an additional seven were added by November 2017 when the site was dedicated.

Ever Rest and the Gallery of Art are part of the Hudson River School Art Trail, a project of the Thomas Cole National Historic Site.

== Ever Rest ==
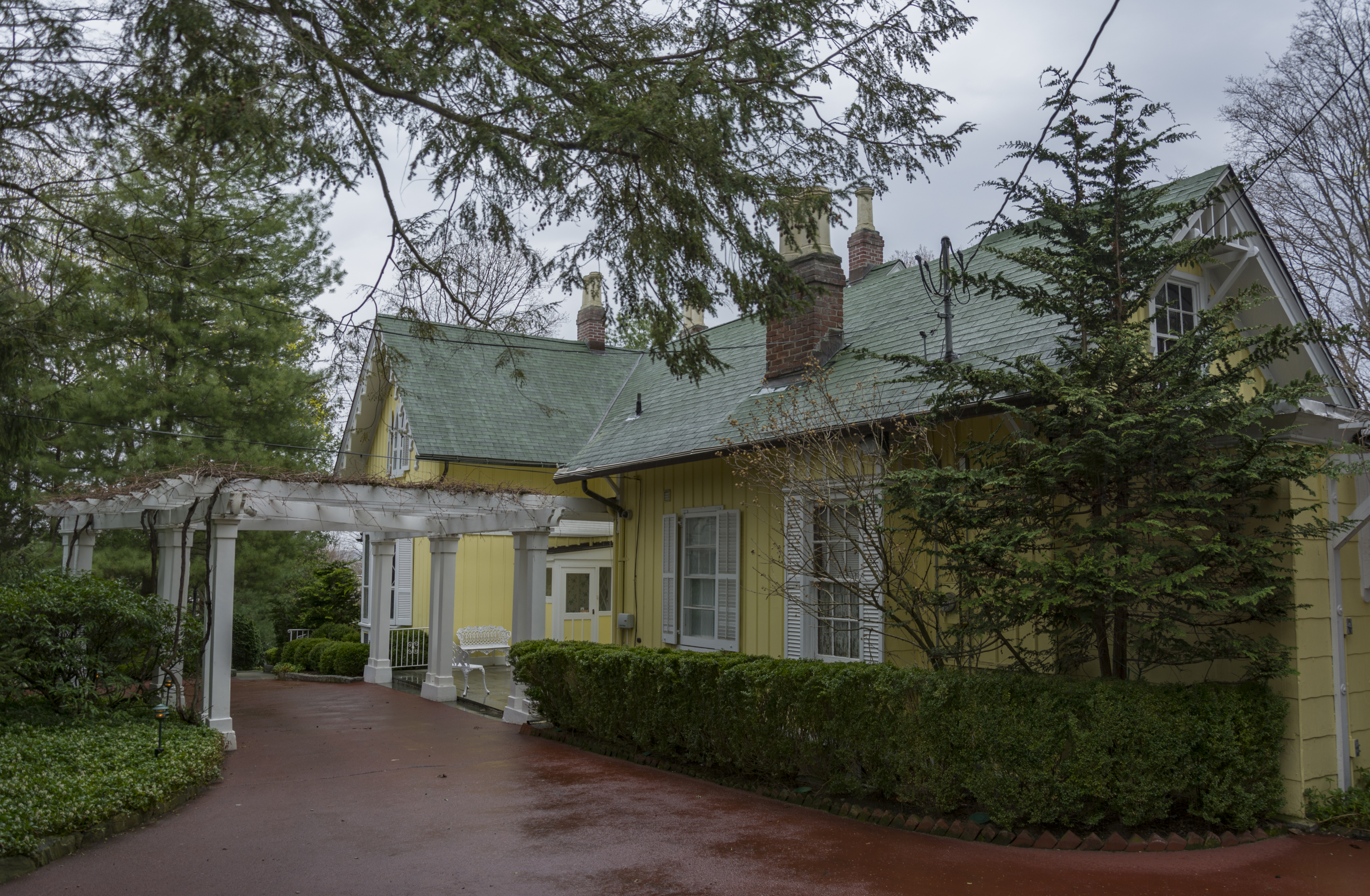
Cropsey's home Ever Rest

Ever Rest, the cottage and last home of Jasper Cropsey, is a 4.5-acre (1.8 ha) site managed by the foundation. The site is at 49 Washington Avenue in Hastings. The home is open for free tours by appointment as a historic house museum. The bright yellow board-and-batten Carpenter Gothic cottage is on the National Register of Historic Places, and was Cropsey's home from 1885 until his death in 1900. The home houses about 40 to 50 of Cropsey's works, including many watercolors.

== Gallery of Art ==
The Gallery of Art building is located in a ravine 60 feet (18 m) beneath Ever Rest, overlooking the nearby Hudson River and the Palisades and behind a commuter parking lot of the Hastings-on-Hudson Metro-North station. There lies a small campus of buildings, including an archive of Cropsey's papers. The site's administration building houses the office of American Arts Quarterly, a publication for Hudson River Realistic painting, with a circulation of about 3,000. The upper floor has a library with about 4,000 books on 19th century painting, along with a computer library and databanks.

The museum is dedicated to the paintings and sculptures of Cropsey and other artists of the 19th century. It holds roughly 75 paintings of Cropsey's, many with scenes from England and Rome, where Cropsey visited, and allegorical works from the 1850s. It is open for free tours by appointment.

The yellow Gothic Revival or Palladian style museum building was built in 1994 and designed by Atlanta architects Rodney Mims Cook Jr. and Peter J. Polites of PolitesCook Architects. Along with the surrounding landscape, it was constructed at a cost of about $4 million. The building was designed to resemble a relic from a past era, recapturing beauty and stability of the 19th century. The building uses many principles of classical architecture, including sunlight directed onto the rotunda's floor.

New York Times art critic Roberta Smith found the building to be "garishly inappropriate and amateurish", with "badly scaled architecture". She noted that the building's main gallery has Cropsey paintings hung well above eye level, poorly lit, and with unlabeled and overcleaned paintings. She found Cropsey's works better-suited and more easy to see at Ever Rest.

=== Exterior ===
The building's exterior has wrought iron doors and a canopy, along with arches and turrets. The parkland surrounding and in front of the gallery includes a duck pond with duck houses.

=== Interior ===
The rotunda was modeled after the Pantheon; its terrazzo floor was modeled after the Piazza del Campidoglio in Rome. The rotunda also has friezes of scenes of Hudson River history. Surrounding the rotunda walls is an inscribed quotation from Cropsey:

Ambition may be praiseworthy when its aim is that of excellence and the fountain from which it draws nourishment that of almighty wisdom.

— Jasper Francis Cropsey

The main gallery is an octagonal Victorian room with maroon-flocked wallpaper above dark oak wainscoting and a timber ceiling, with a large oak staircase to the second floor. The room features Cropsey paintings from its floor to ceiling; the light is kept low, allowing the paintings to glow. It was designed after Hudson River houses including Ever Rest and Lyndhurst. David Linley designed furniture in the building. The building also has commissioned sculptures and religious statues, including a replica of an inscribed lintel, with a message from King Abgar of Edessa to Jesus Christ. The building holds a research library of Hudson River School art and painters, which the organization aims to make the most complete resource for artists of the school within Westchester County. The space also has a gallery for temporary exhibitions by contemporary representational artists.

== Publications ==
- Speiser, Anthony M., ed. (2013). Jasper F. Cropsey: Catalogue Raisonne, Volume I, 1842–1863. Hastings-on-Hudson, New York: Newington-Cropsey Foundation. ISBN 978-0976816577. OCLC 869008207.
- Speiser, Anthony M., ed. (2017). Jasper F. Cropsey: Catalogue Raisonne, Volume II, 1864–1884. Hastings-on-Hudson, New York: Newington-Cropsey Foundation. ISBN 978-0985924720. OCLC 869008207.
