= Ever Rest =

Historic house museum in New York, US

- Jasper F. Cropsey House and Studio
- U.S. National Register of Historic Places
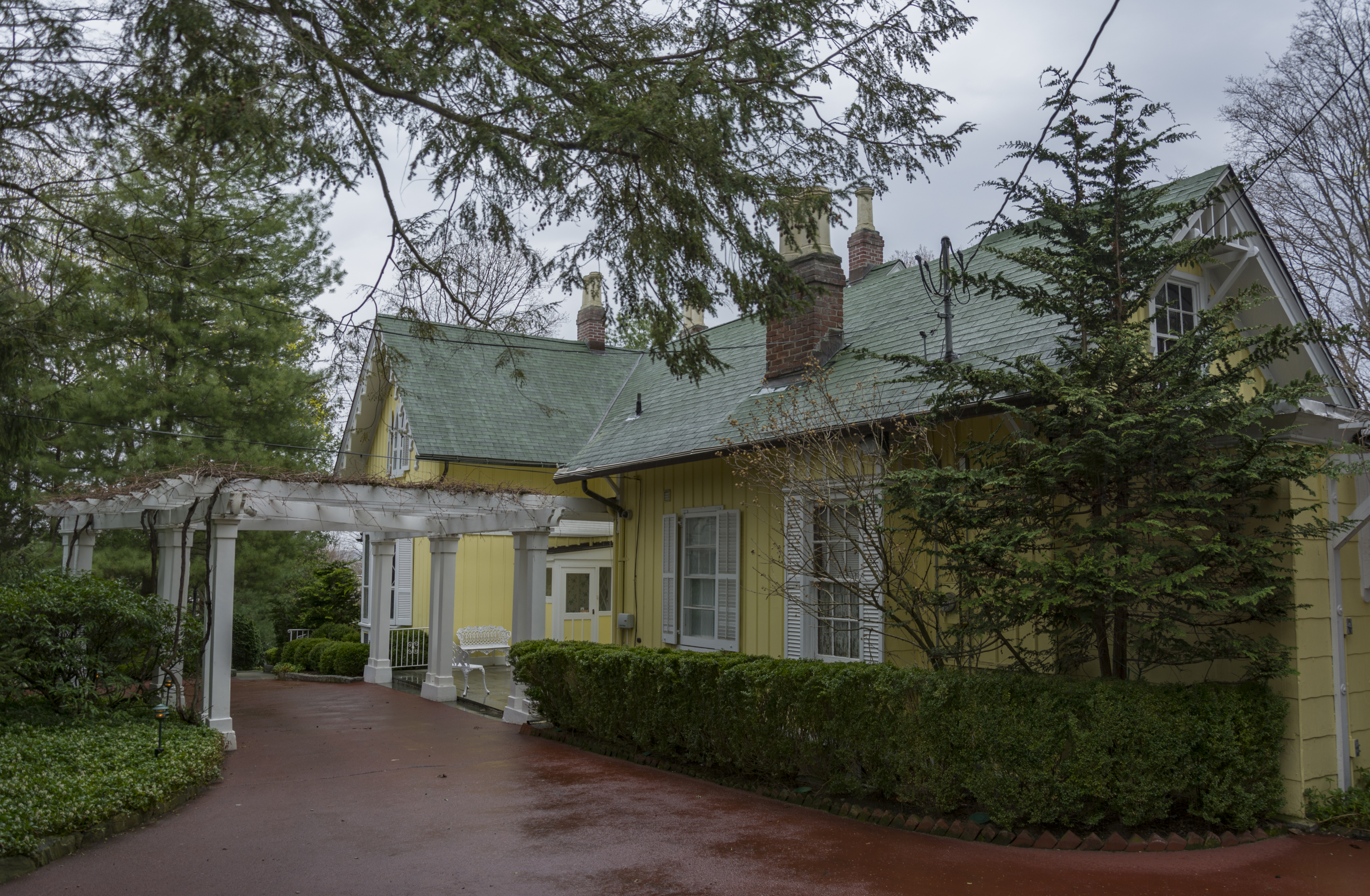

- Location within New York Location within the United States
- Location: 49 Washington Avenue, Hastings-on-Hudson, New York 10706
- Coordinates: 40°59′35″N 73°52′55″W
- Area: 4 acres (1.6 ha)
- Built: ca. 1835
- Architectural style: "Pointed style"
- NRHP reference No.: 73001287
- Added to NRHP: May 17, 1973

Ever Rest is the home and studio of Jasper F. Cropsey, a painter in the Hudson River School. The historic house museum is located in Hastings-on-Hudson, New York and was built in 1835. Cropsey acquired the property in 1886, and built an artist studio addition which was completed in 1888. It is owned and managed by the Newington-Cropsey Foundation which preserves the house and the work of Cropsey.

It was added to the National Register of Historic Places in 1973.

== See also ==
- National Register of Historic Places listings in southern Westchester County, New York
- List of single-artist museums
