= Jasper Francis Cropsey =

American painter (1823–1900)

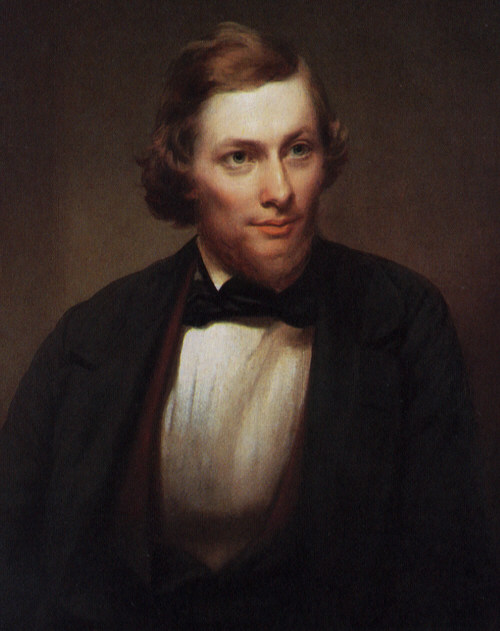
- Portrait in oil at age 24 by Edward L. Mooney (1847)
- Born: February 18, 1823; Staten Island, New York, U.S.
- Died: June 22, 1900 (aged 77); Hastings-on-Hudson, New York, U.S.
- Education: Hudson River School
- Known for: Landscape art; painting

Jasper Francis Cropsey (February 18, 1823 – June 22, 1900) was an American architect and artist. He is best known for his Hudson River School landscape paintings.

== Early years ==
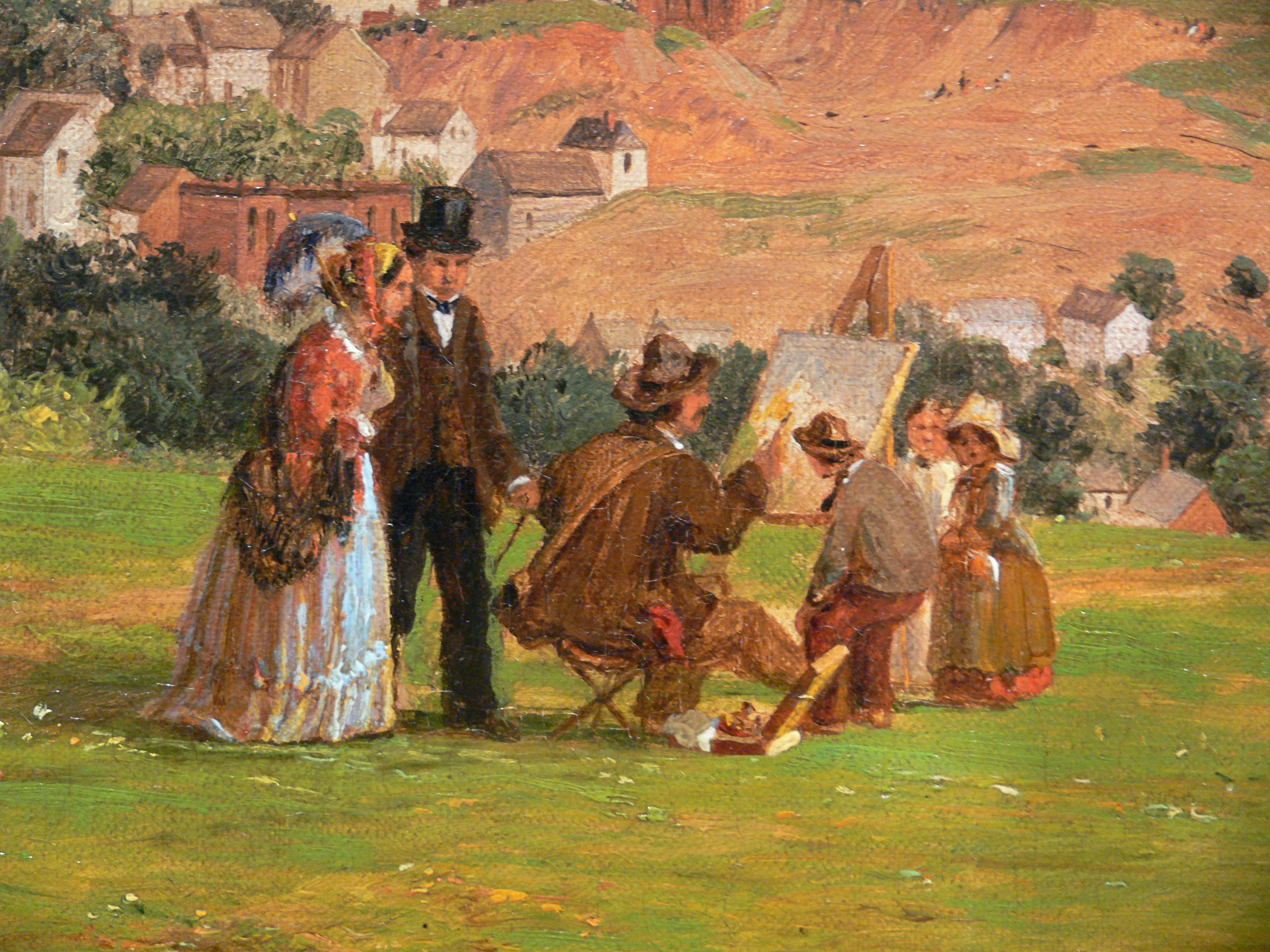
Self-portrait in The Narrows from Staten Island(1868), detail

Cropsey was born on the farm of his father, Jacob Rezeau Cropsey, in Rossville on Staten Island, New York, the oldest of eight children. As a boy, Cropsey had recurring periods of poor health. While absent from school, Cropsey taught himself to draw. His early drawings included architectural sketches and landscapes drawn on notepads and in the margins of his schoolbooks.

== Career ==
Cropsey trained as an architect under the tuition of Joseph Trench in the early 1840s, a period in which he was also trained in watercolor painting, instructed by Edward Maury, and took some life drawing courses at the National Academy of Design. He set up his own architecture office in 1843, but began exhibiting his watercolors at the National Academy of Design in 1844. A year later he was elected an associate member and turned exclusively to landscape painting; shortly after he was featured in an exhibition entitled "Italian Compositions".

Cropsey traveled in Europe from 1847 to 1849, visiting England, France, Switzerland, and Italy. He was elected a full member of the Academy in 1851. Cropsey was a personal friend of Henry Tappan, the president of the University of Michigan from 1852 to 1863. At Tappan's invitation, he traveled to Ann Arbor in 1855 and produced two paintings, one of the Detroit Observatory, and a landscape of the campus. He went abroad again in 1856, and resided seven years in London, sending his pictures to the Royal Academy and to the International exhibition of 1862.

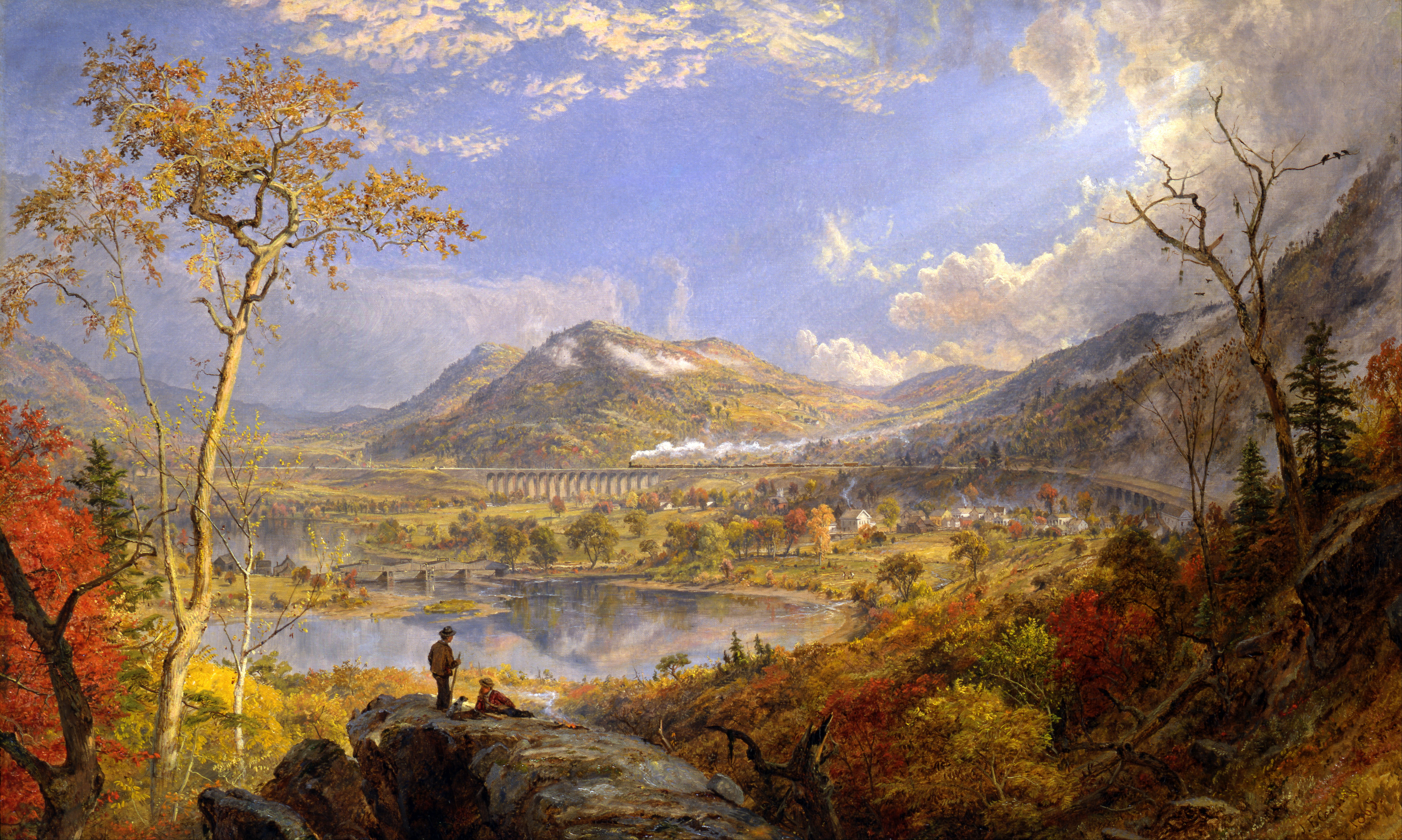
Starrucca Viaduct, Pennsylvania (1865)

Returning home, he opened a studio in New York and specialized in autumnal landscape paintings of the northeastern United States, often idealized and with vivid colors. Cropsey co-founded, with ten fellow artists, the American Society of Painters in Water Colors in 1866. He also made the architectural designs for the stations of the elevated railways in New York.

=== Hudson River School ===
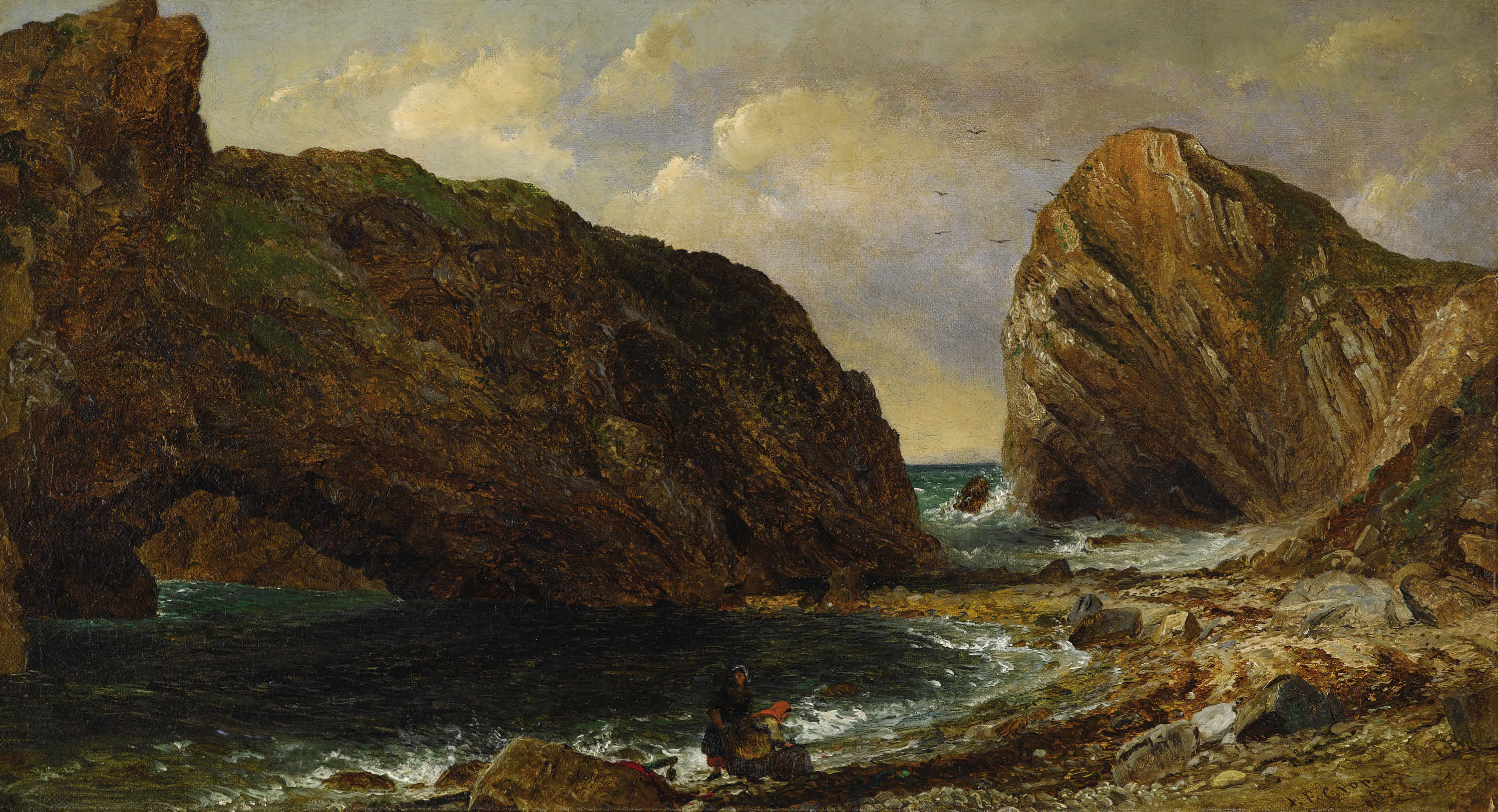
By the Sea, Lulworth (1857)

Cropsey's interest in architecture continued throughout his life and was a strong influence in his painting, most evident in his precise arrangement and outline of forms. But Cropsey was best known for his lavish use of color and, as a first-generation member from the Hudson River School, painted autumn landscapes that startled viewers with their boldness and brilliance. As an artist, he believed landscapes were the highest art form and that nature was a direct manifestation of God. He also felt a patriotic affiliation with nature and saw his paintings as depicting the rugged and unspoiled qualities of America.

Jasper Cropsey died in anonymity but was rediscovered by galleries and collectors in the 1960s. Today, Cropsey's paintings are found in many major American museums, including the National Gallery of Art, the North Carolina Museum of Art, the Currier Museum of Art, the Pennsylvania Academy of the Fine Arts, the University of Michigan Museum of Art, the Museum of the Shenandoah Valley, the Metropolitan Museum of Art, the Los Angeles County Museum of Art, the Crystal Bridges Museum of American Art, the Detroit Institute of Arts, the Timken Museum of Art in San Diego, the Honolulu Museum of Art, the Fine Arts Museum of San Francisco, the Princeton University Art Museum, and the Museum of Fine Arts, Boston. Works by Cropsey also hang in the White House.

=== Works ===
Some of Cropsey's works include Jedburgh Abbey; Pontaine Marshes (1847); Backwoods of America (1857); Richmond Hill (1862); Indian Summer (1866); Greenwood Lake (1875); Lake Nemi in Italy (1879); Old Church at Arreton (1880); Ramapo Valley (1881); Autumn on the Hudson (1860): Wawayanda Valley (1883); Spring-time in England (1884); October in Ramapo Valley (1885); Autumn on Lake George, and A Showery Day (1886).

His architectural works included New York City brownstones, the since-demolished 14th Street station for the IRT Sixth Avenue Line in Manhattan, and St. Luke's Episcopal Church on Staten Island.

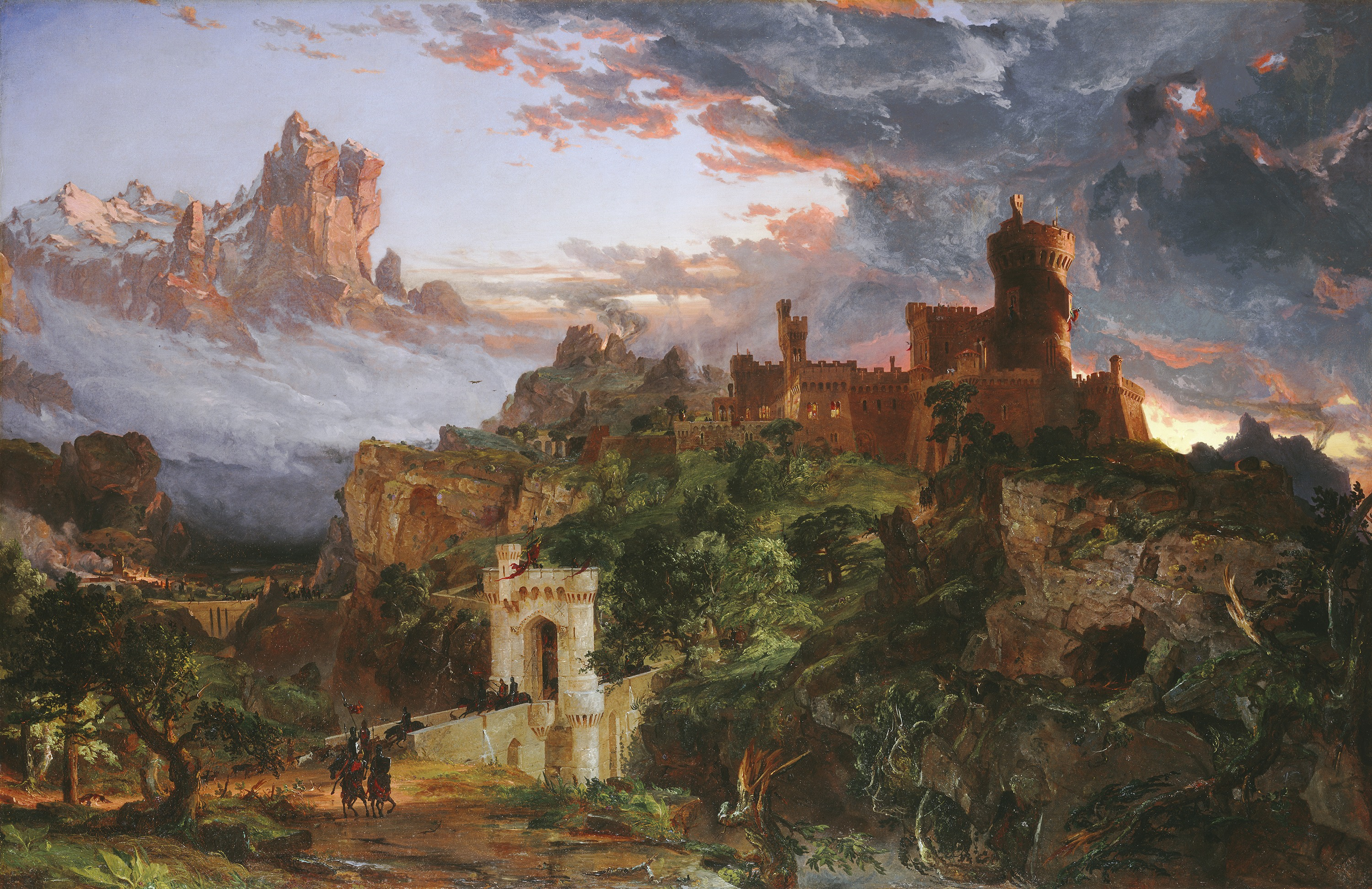
The Spirit of War, 1851

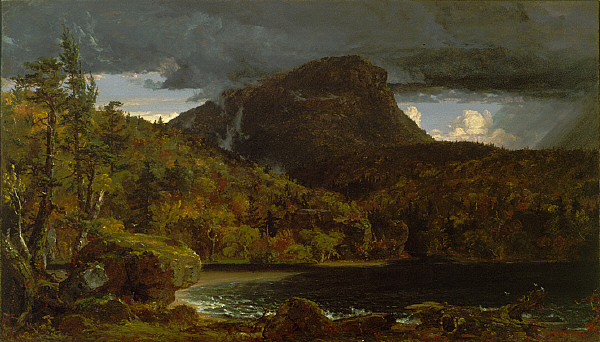
High Torne Mountain, Rockland County, New York, 1851

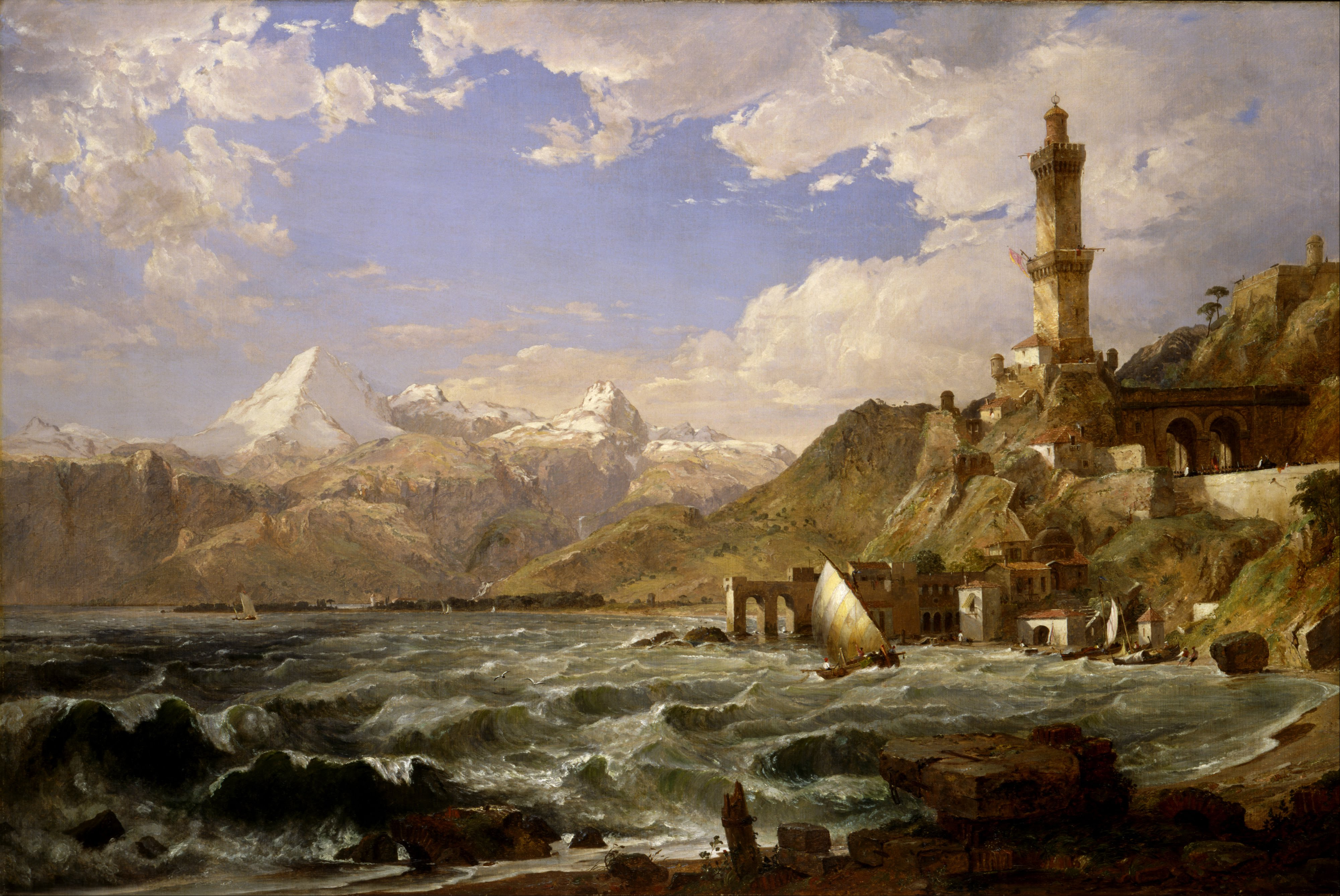
The Coast of Genoa, 1854

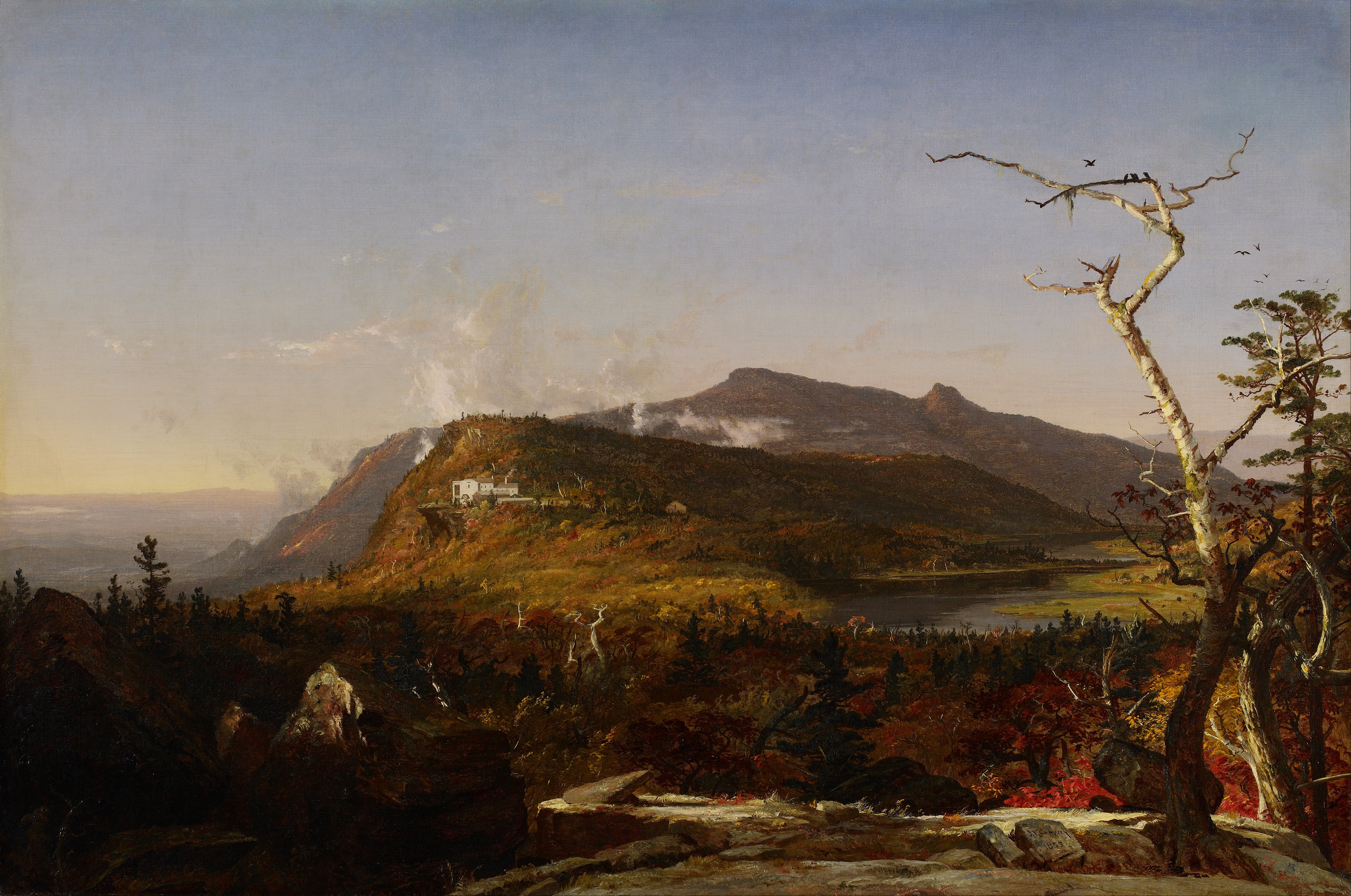
Catskill Mountain House, 1855

An Indian Summer Morning in the White Mountains, 1857

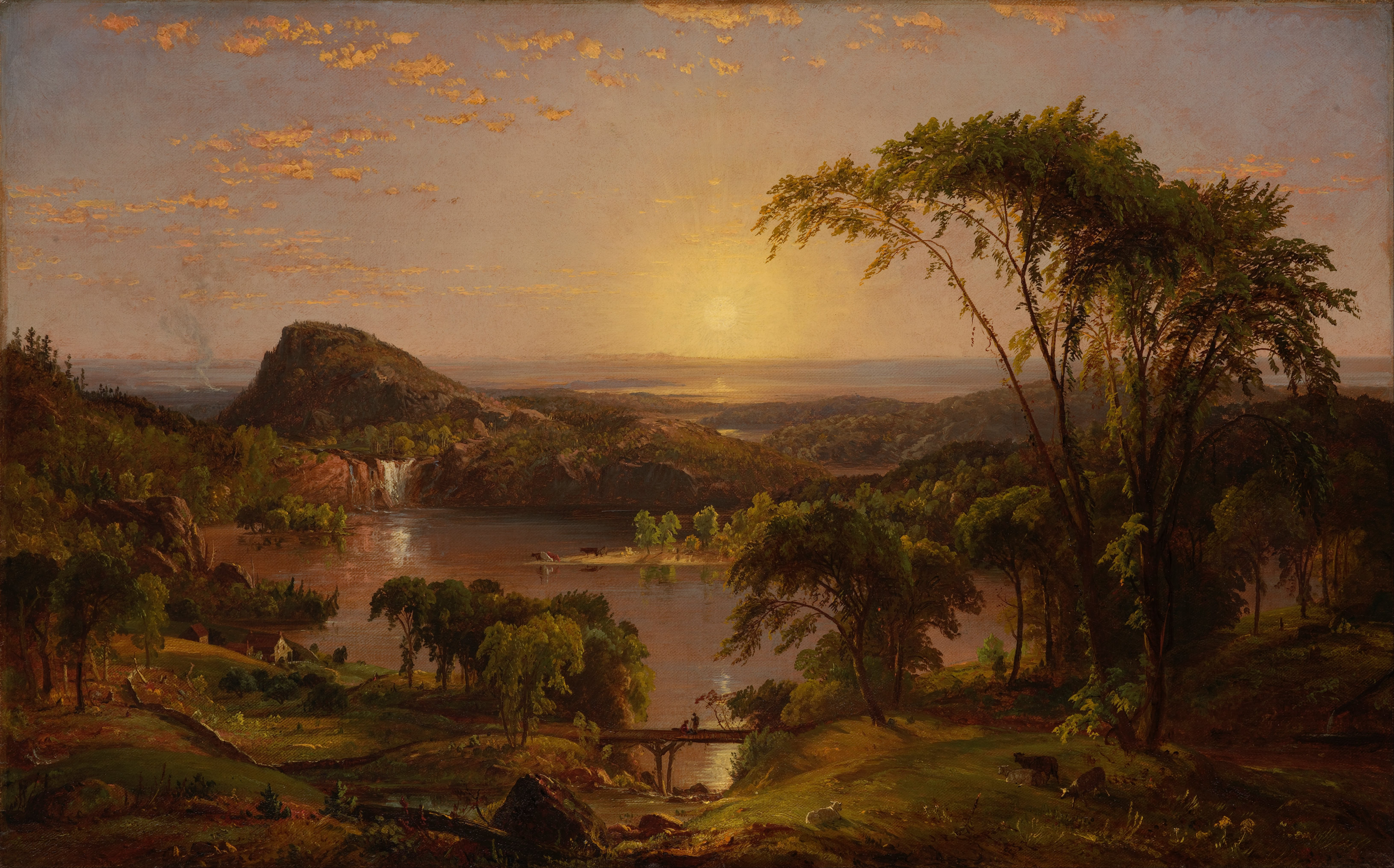
Summer, Lake Ontario, 1857

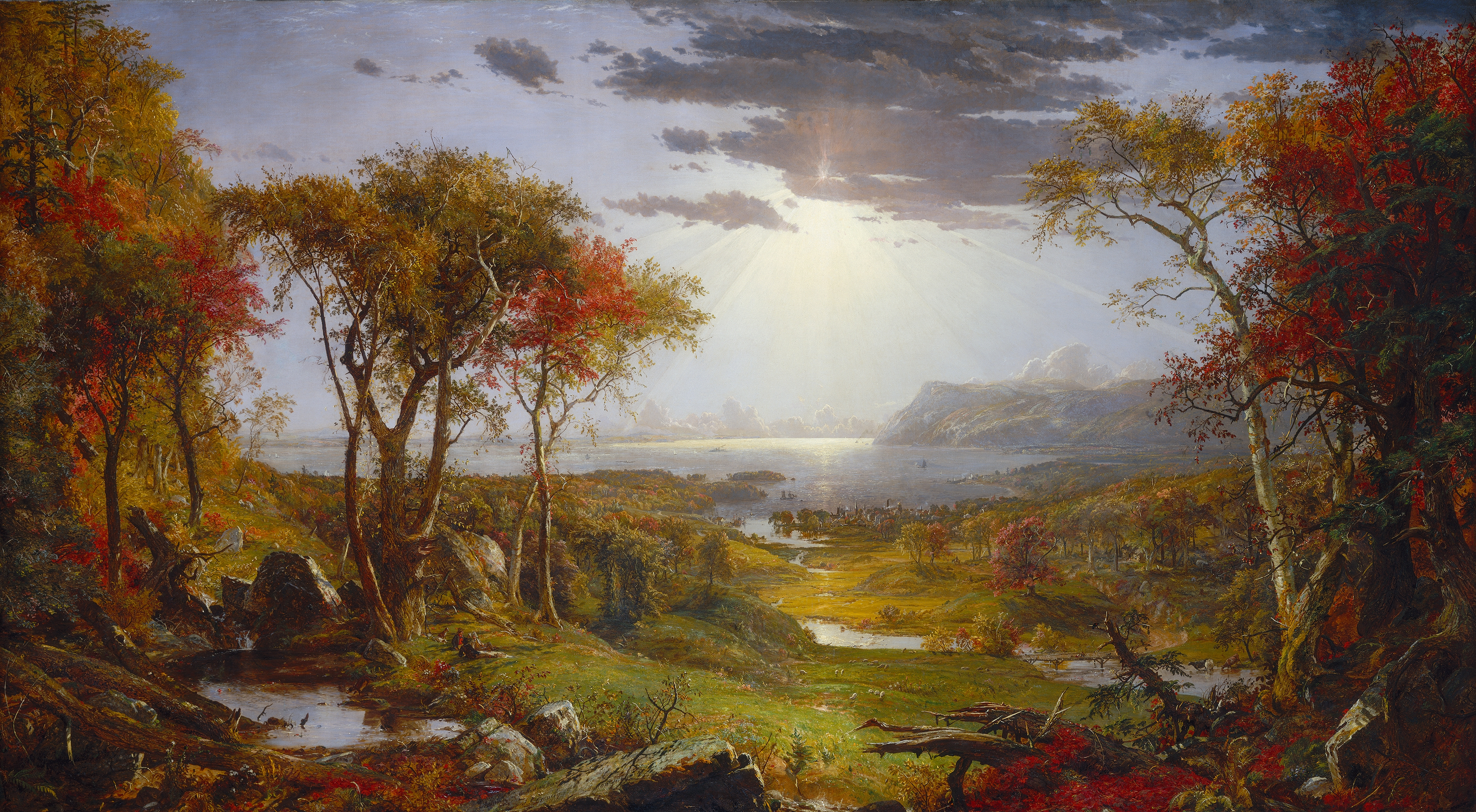
Autumn on the Hudson, 1860

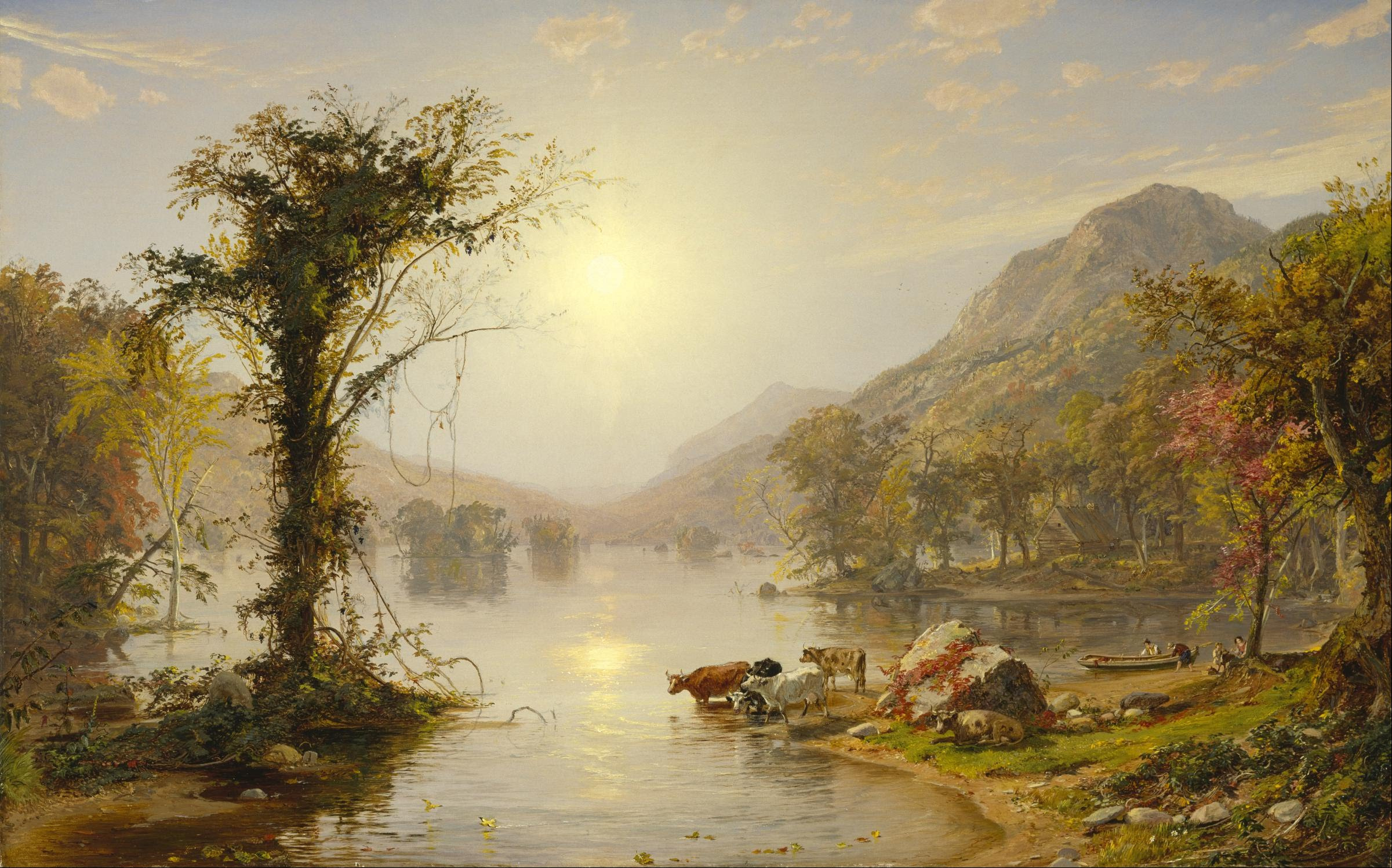
Autumn on Greenwood Lake, 1861

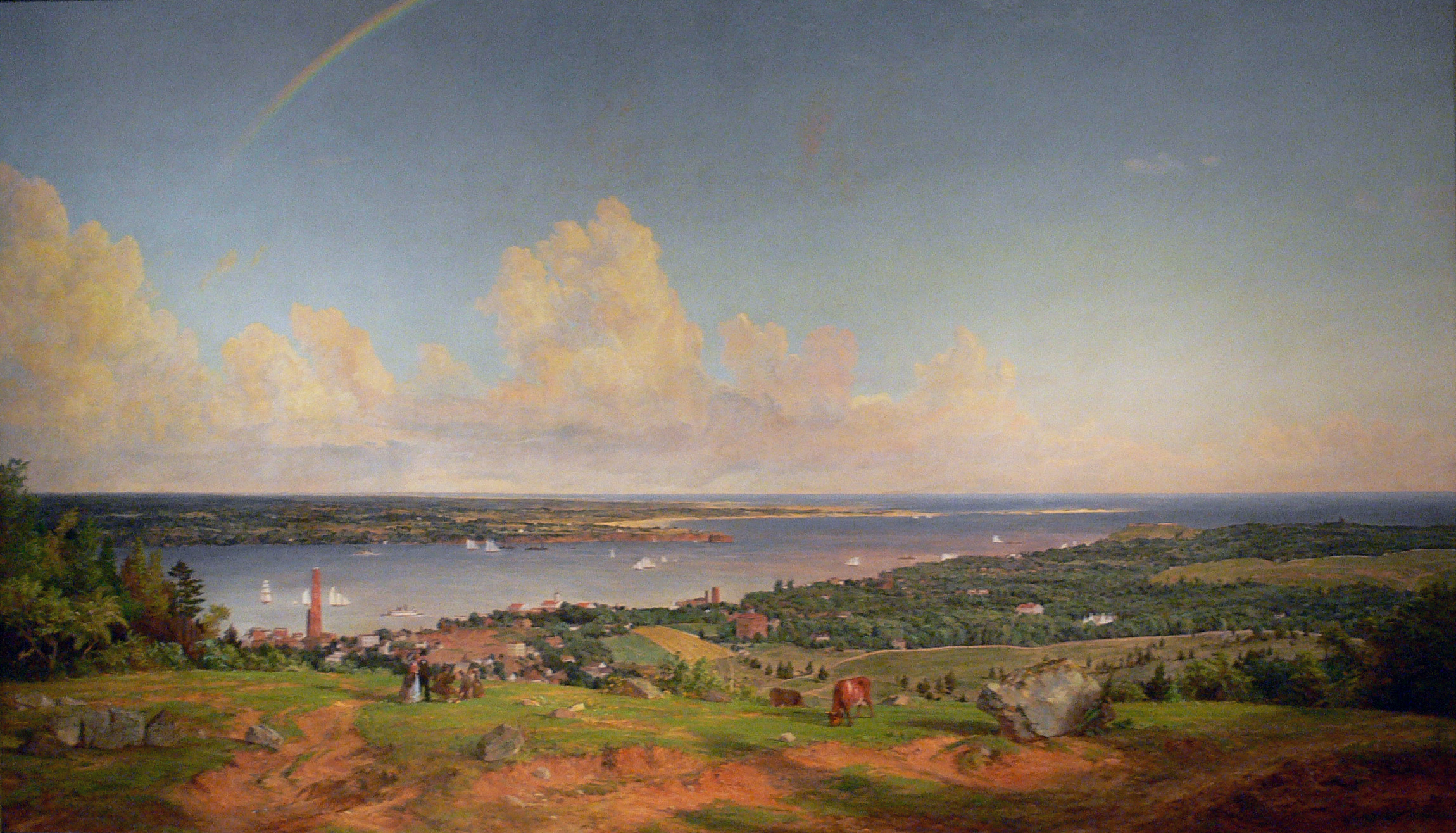
The Narrows from Staten Island, 1868

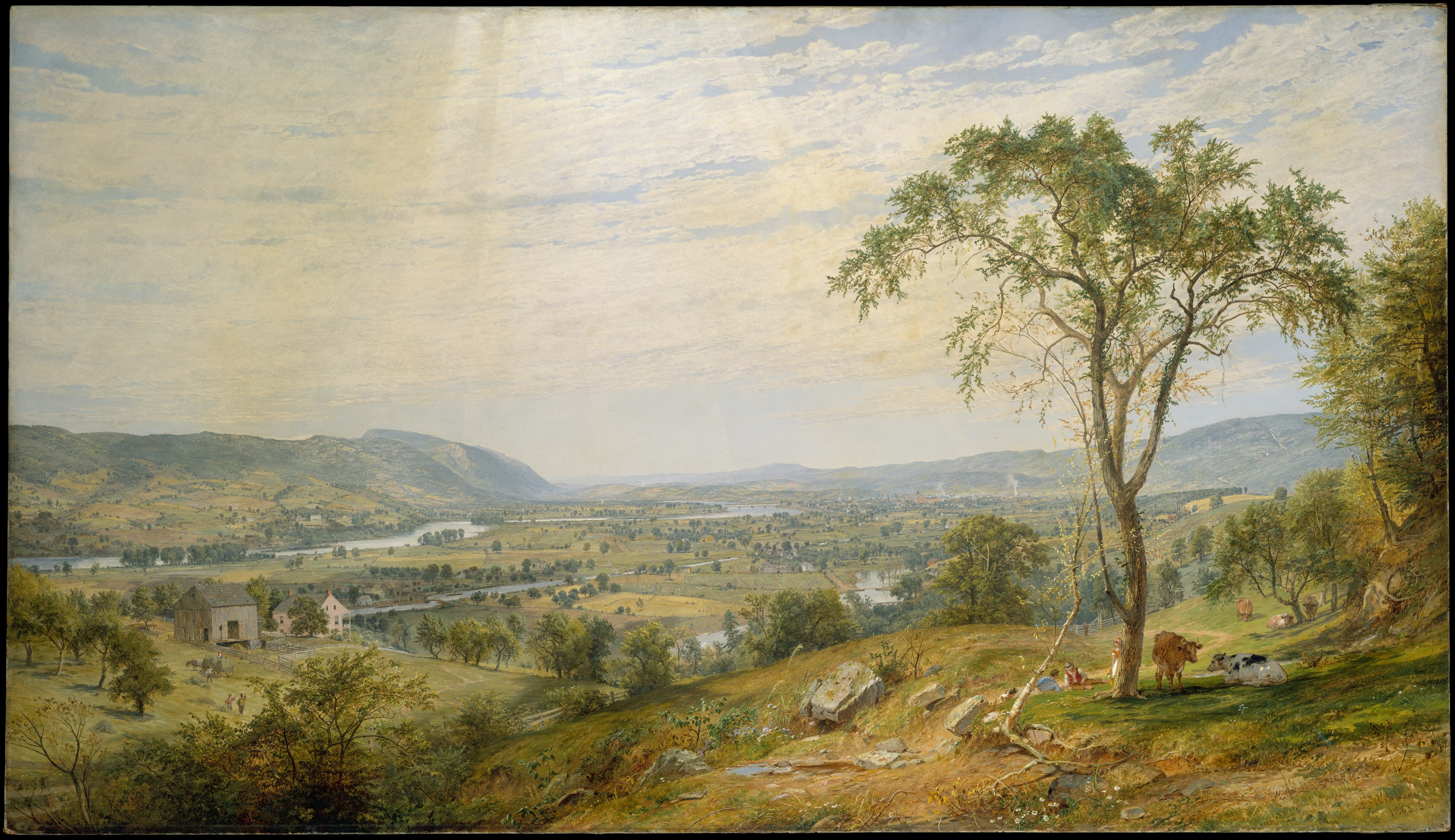
The Valley of Wyoming, 1865, Metropolitan Museum of Art

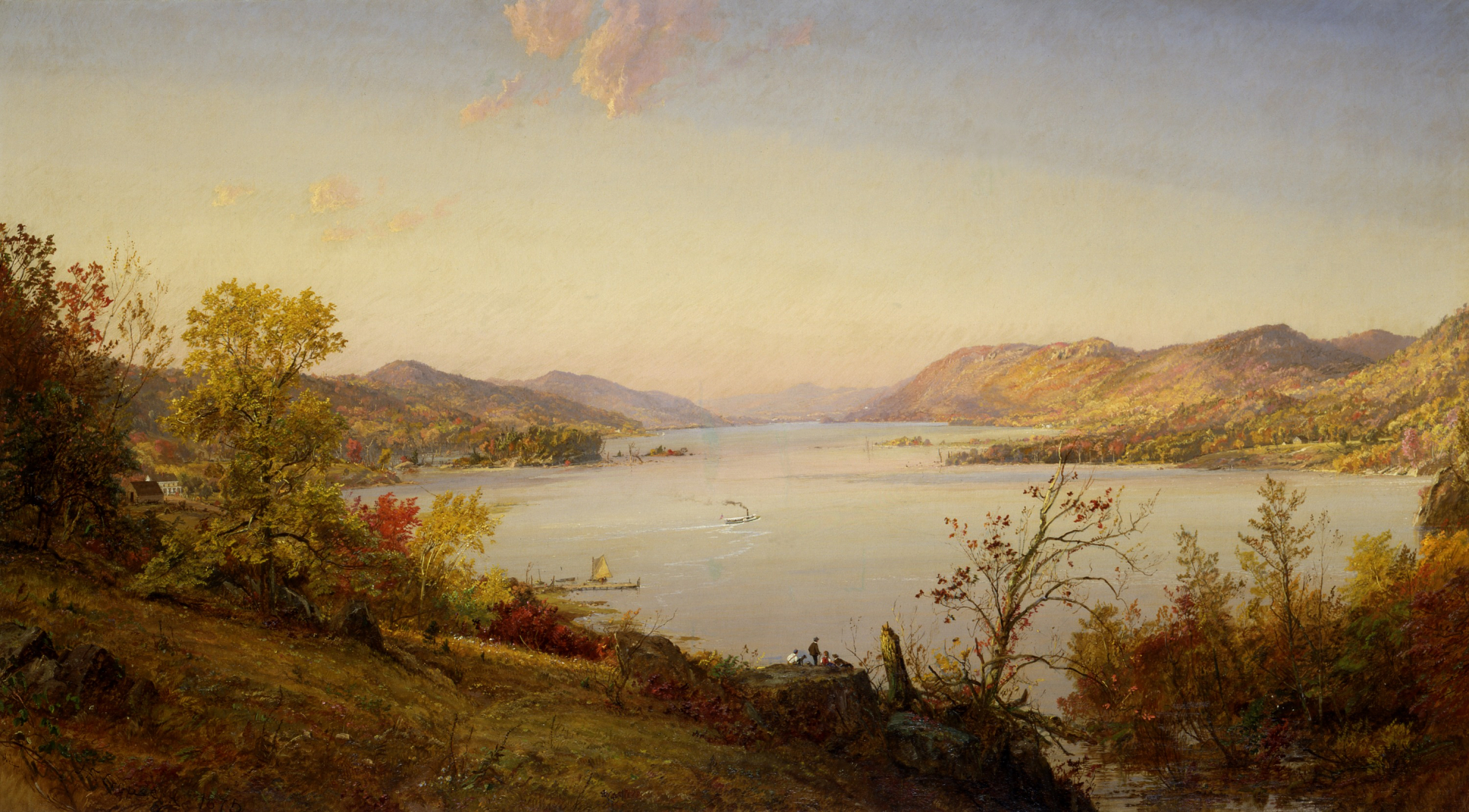
Greenwood Lake, 1875, Smithsonian American Art Museum

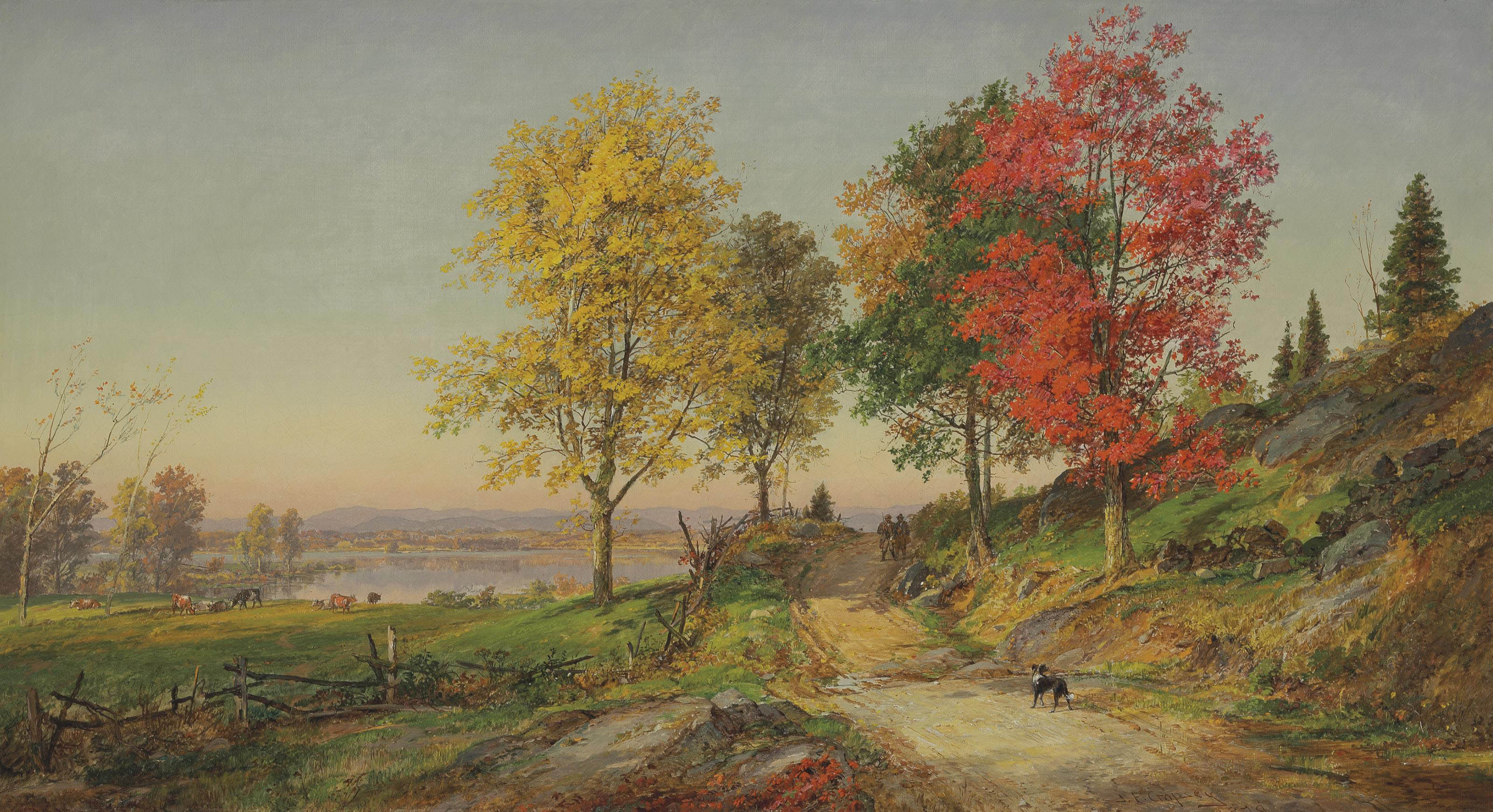
Greenwood Lake, 1879

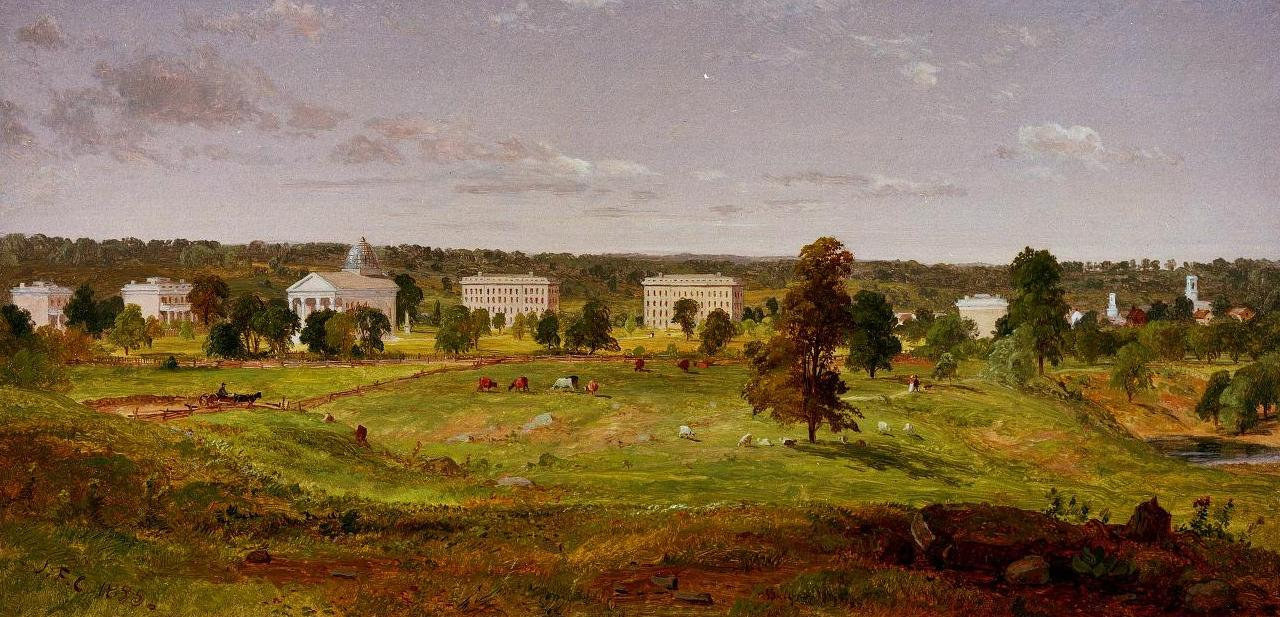
University of Michigan, Jasper Cropsey, 1855, University of Michigan Museum of Art

Some of Cropsey's painting command high prices at auctions. Greenwood Lake (1879) sold at Christie's auction in 2012 for $422,500. Sunset, Camel's Hump, Lake Champlain (1877) sold for $314,500 in 2011.

=== Collection ===
Cropsey's home and studio, Ever Rest, in Hastings-on-Hudson, New York, has the largest permanent collection of Cropsey's work, collected by his great-granddaughter Barbara Newington. The collection has been on display since 1977 and the founding of the Newington-Cropsey Foundation.

== Personal life ==
Cropsey married Maria Cooley in May 1847. He had met her during one of his visits to Greenwood Lake after 1843. Maria's father, Isaac P. Cooley, was a justice of the peace from 1837 to 1839 and became a judge over the New Jersey Court of Common Pleas in 1840. Cooley then became a member of New Jersey State House of Assembly from 1860 to 1861. Cooley offered to build Cropsey a studio on his estate but the offer was declined. In 1869 Cropsey built a 29-room Gothic Revival mansion and studio in Warwick, New York that he named Aladdin. As well as living in New York City, he spent part of his time in Warwick until the mansion was sold in 1884.

In 1884 Cropsey first rented then in 1885 bought a house at Hastings-on-Hudson, New York he named Ever Rest. He and Maria had two children: Mary Cortelyou Cropsey Howells (b. September. 5, 1850, d. July 30, 1921) and Lilly Frances Cropsey (b. July 16, 1859, d. February 21, 1889). Cropsey lived at Ever Rest until his death on June 22, 1900, and his wife Maria lived there until she died in 1906, having been married to "Frank" for 54 years.

== Legacy and honors ==
- The World War II Liberty Ship SS Jasper F. Cropsey was named in his honor.

== Monuments ==
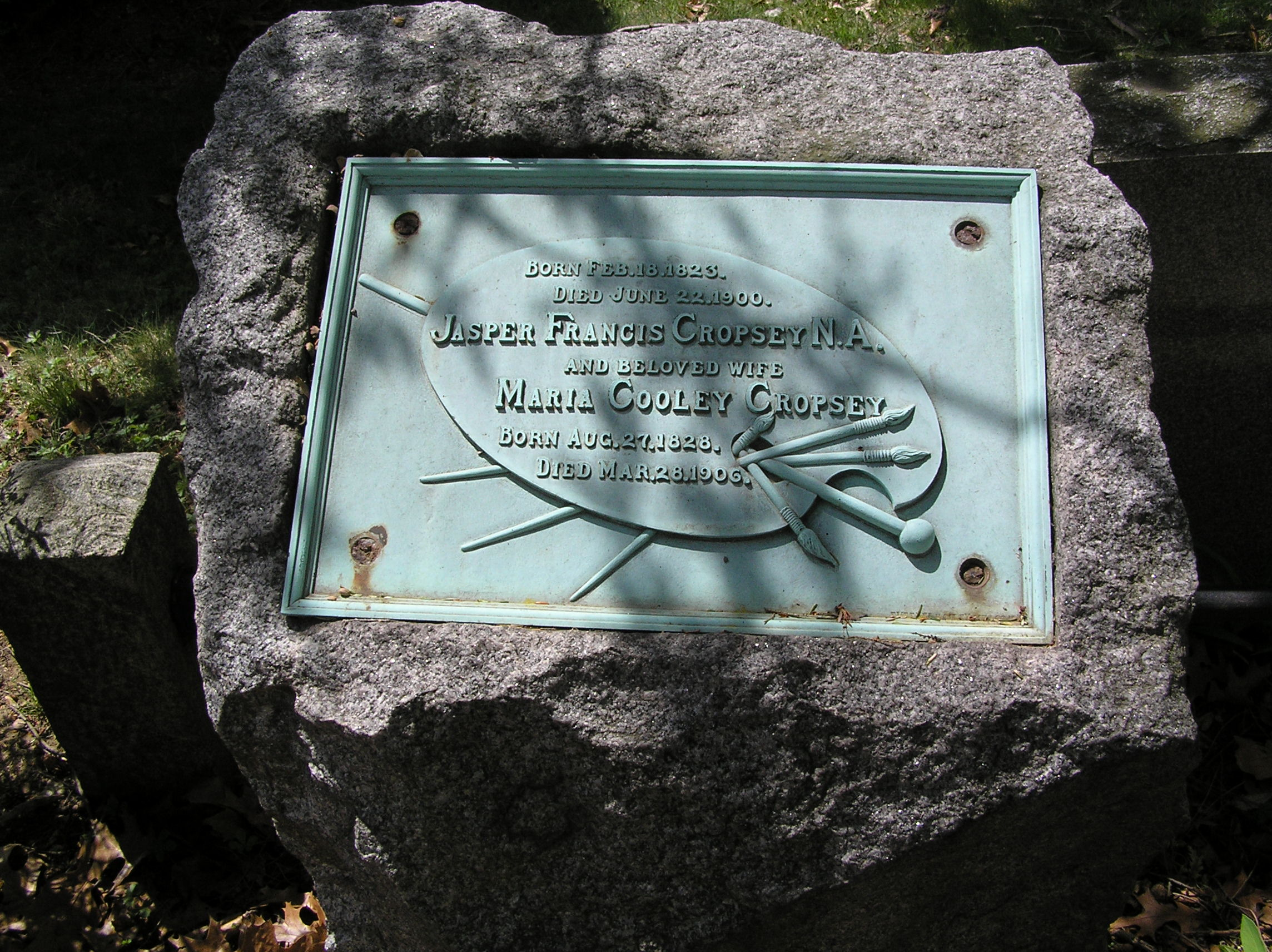
Headstone in Sleepy Hollow Cemetery

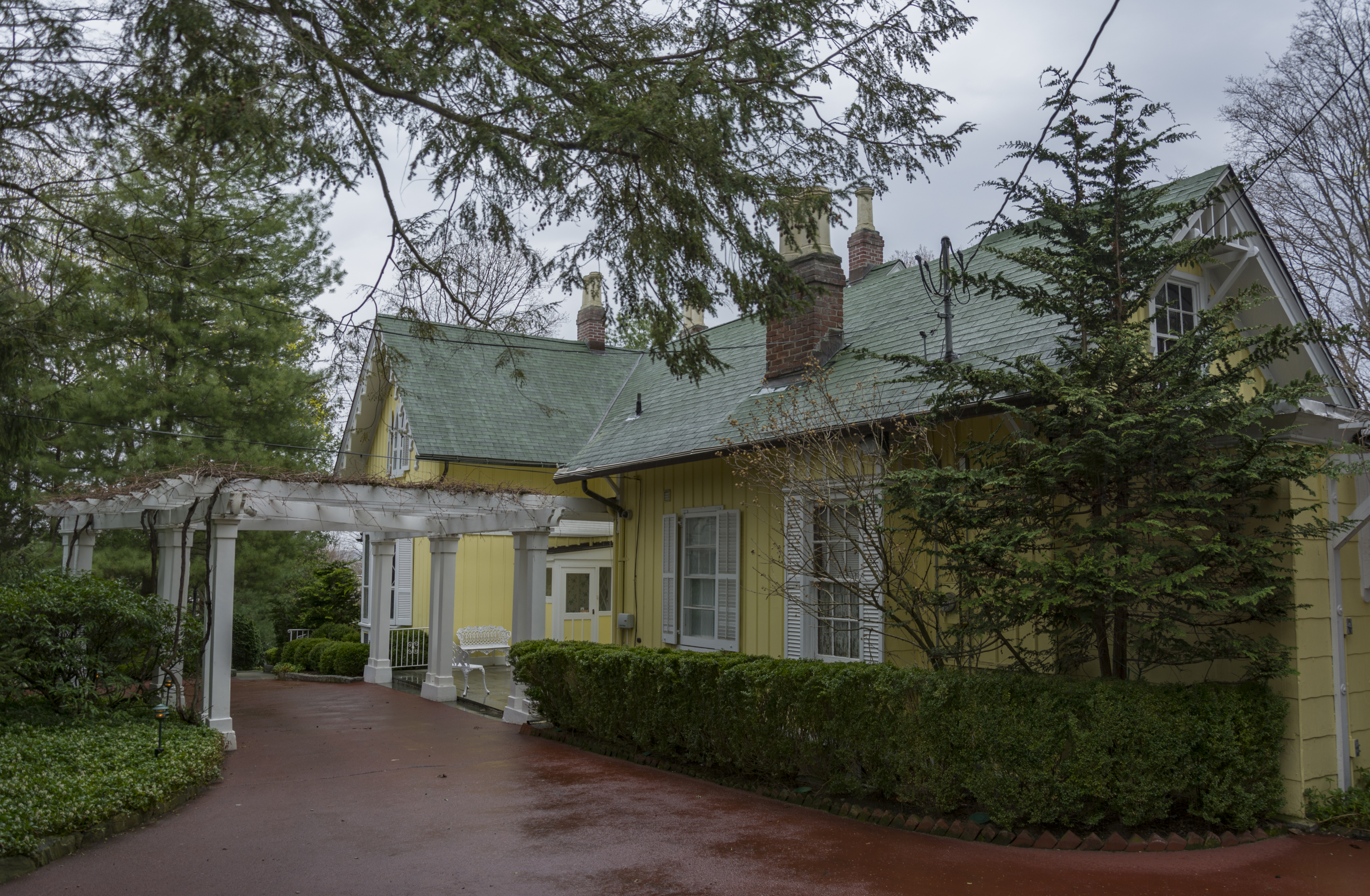
Cropsey's home Ever Rest

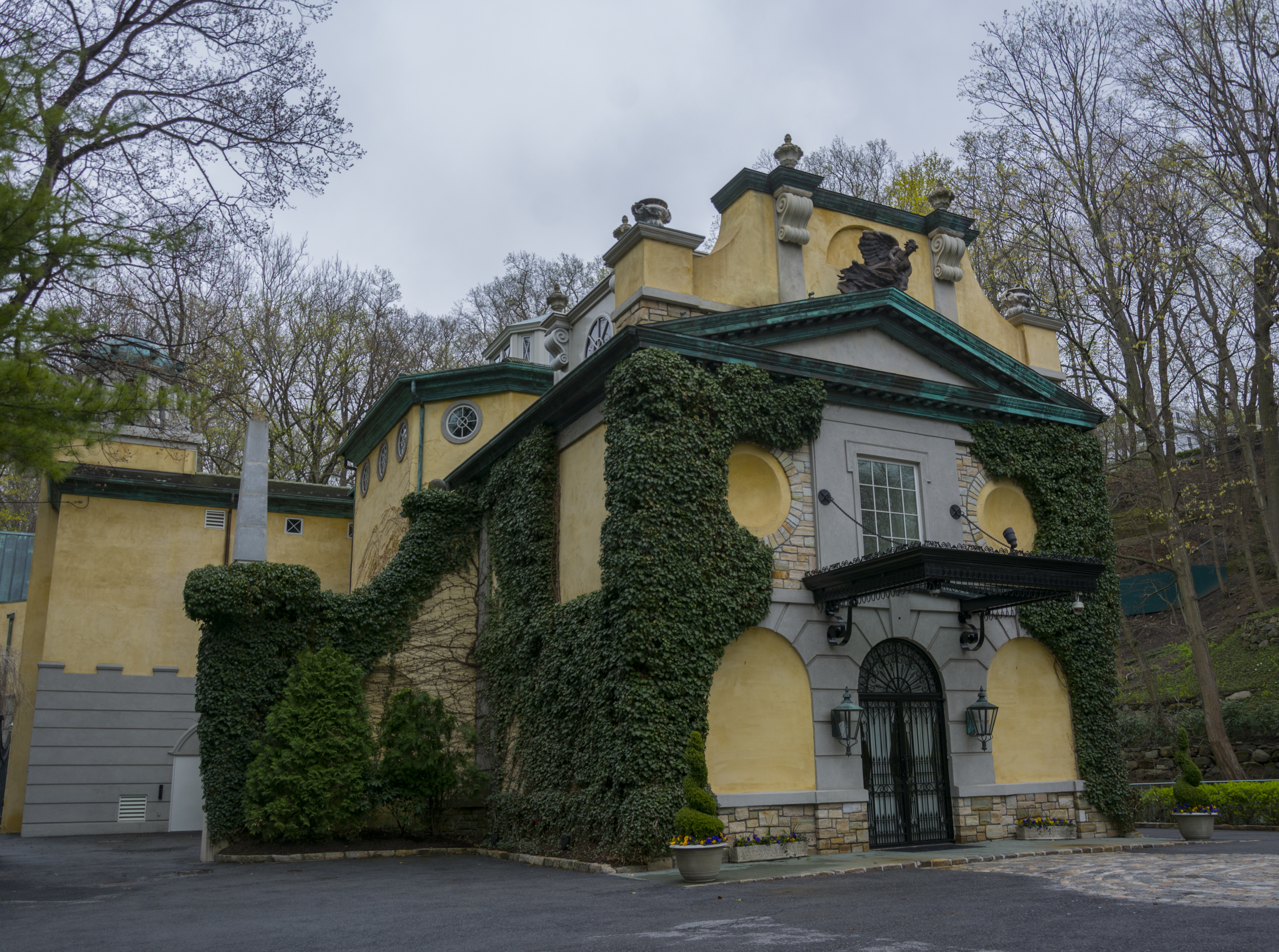
The Newington-Cropsey Foundation's Gallery of Art, a museum of Cropsey's works

== See also ==
- List of Hudson River School artists
