= Battle of Newtown =

1779 battle of the American Revolutionary War

- Part of the Sullivan Expedition
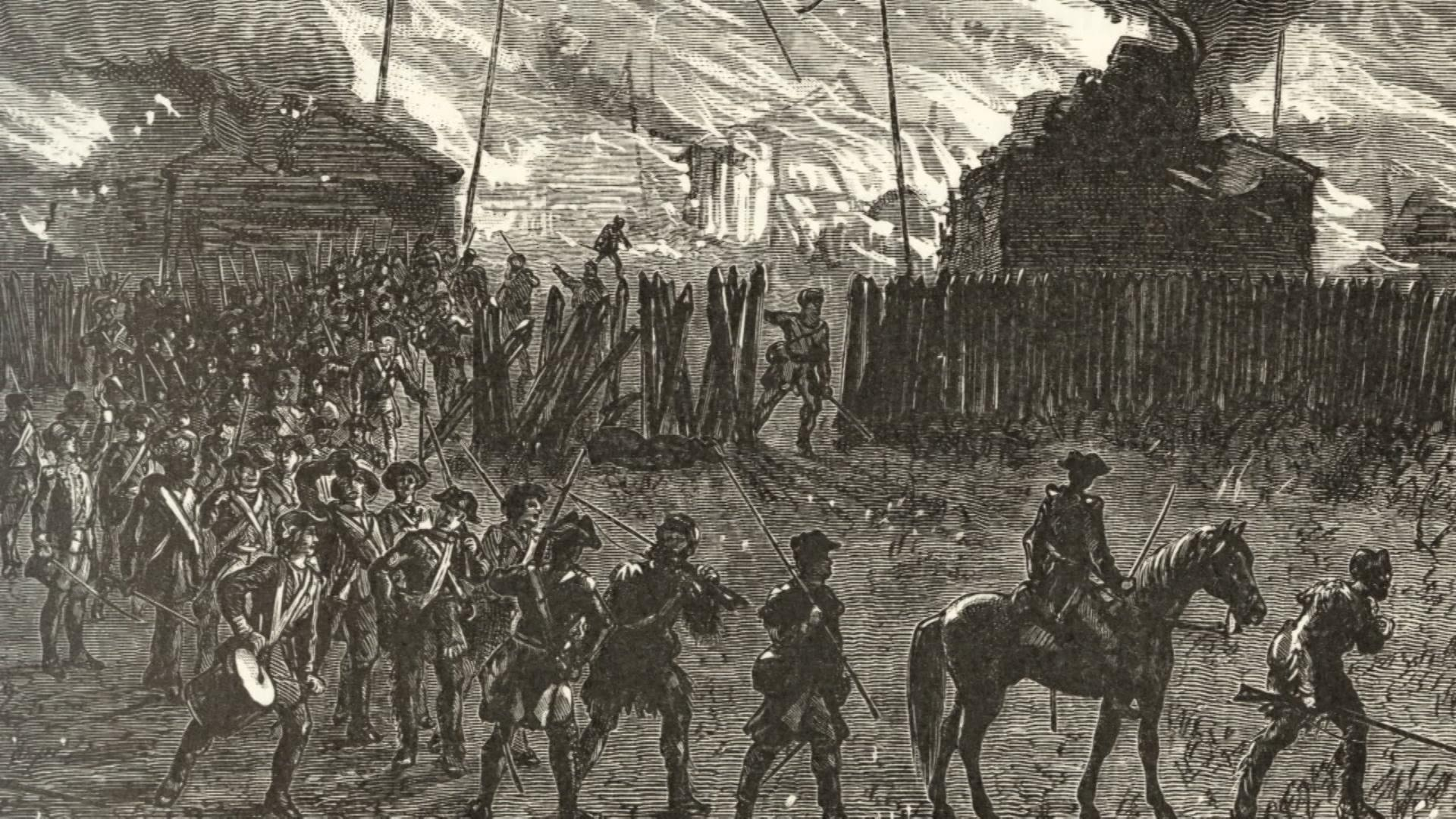
- Illustration of the burning of the Delaware village of Newtown by Sullivan's forces on August 30, 1779
| Date | August 29, 1779 |
| Location | Town of Ashland / Town of Elmira, Chemung County, New York, between the present-day city of Elmira and the village of Waverly 42.045278°N 76.733333°W |
| Result | American victory |

Belligerents
| United States | Great Britain; Haudenosaunee |

Commanders and leaders
| John Sullivan; James Clinton; Enoch Poor; Edward Hand; William Maxwell | John Butler; Walter Butler; Sayenqueraghta; Cornplanter; Joseph Brant; Fish Carrier |

Strength
| 3,200 Continental regulars 2 companies of militia 9 artillery pieces | 200–250 Butler's Rangers; 300–350 Seneca, Cayuga, Mohawk, and Munsee Delaware; 14 British regulars (8th Regiment of Foot) |

Casualties and losses
| 8 killed 31 wounded | 12 Haudenosaunee & 3 Rangers killed 9 Haudenosaunee & 3 Rangers wounded 2 Rangers captured |

The Battle of Newtown (August 29, 1779) was the only major battle of the Sullivan Expedition, an armed offensive led by Major General John Sullivan that was ordered by George Washington to end the threat of the Haudenosaunee who had sided with the British in the American Revolutionary War. Opposing Sullivan's four brigades were 250 Loyalist soldiers from Butler's Rangers, commanded by Major John Butler, and 350 Haudenosaunee and Lenape (Delaware). Butler and Mohawk war leader Joseph Brant did not want to make a stand at Newtown, and instead proposed to harass the enemy on the march, but were overruled by Sayenqueraghta and other Indigenous war leaders.

This battle, which was the most significant military engagement of the campaign, took place at the foot of a hill along the Chemung River just outside what is now Elmira, New York.

== Terrain ==
The engagement occurred along a tall hill, now called Sullivan Hill and part of the Newtown Battlefield State Park. The hillside, running southeast to northwest next to the Chemung River, was a mile long at its crest, which rose 600 feet (180 m) above the path at its base leading into the Delaware village of Newtown. The slope of the hill was covered with pine and a dense growth of shrub oak. Hoffman Hollow, a marshy area of small hillocks and thick stands of trees, was just to the east of the hill. A small watercourse, called Baldwin Creek, ran through the hollow and emptied into the Chemung River (referred to as the Cayuga branch in Sullivan's reports). The creek followed the hill northwest on the opposite side from the river and had steep western banks.

== Haudenosaunee and British preparation ==
In May 1779, in response to rumours of a planned American invasion of Haudenosaunee territory, Butler, accompanied by five companies of Butler's Rangers and a detachment of the 8th Regiment of Foot, left Fort Niagara and established a forward operating base at Kanadaseaga located near the northern end of Seneca Lake. In the middle of August, Butler accompanied by about 300 Seneca and Cayuga warriors led by Sayenqueraghta, Cornplanter, and Fish Carrier moved south to the Chemung River where they were joined by Joseph Brant and Brant's Volunteers, as well as a number of Delaware.

Butler and Brant suggested that, because of the size and composition of Sullivan's forces, harassment raids would be more effective than making a stand. They were overruled by Sayenqueraghta, Cornplanter and the Delaware who selected a position on the north side of the Chemung River for an ambush.

The Rangers and their native allies hastily constructed a horseshoe-shaped camouflaged breastwork of logs about 150 feet (46 m) up the southeast spur of the hill, within musket range of the path. The hill was used as both an observation point and a barrier to the approach of the Continental Army.

== Expedition and battle ==
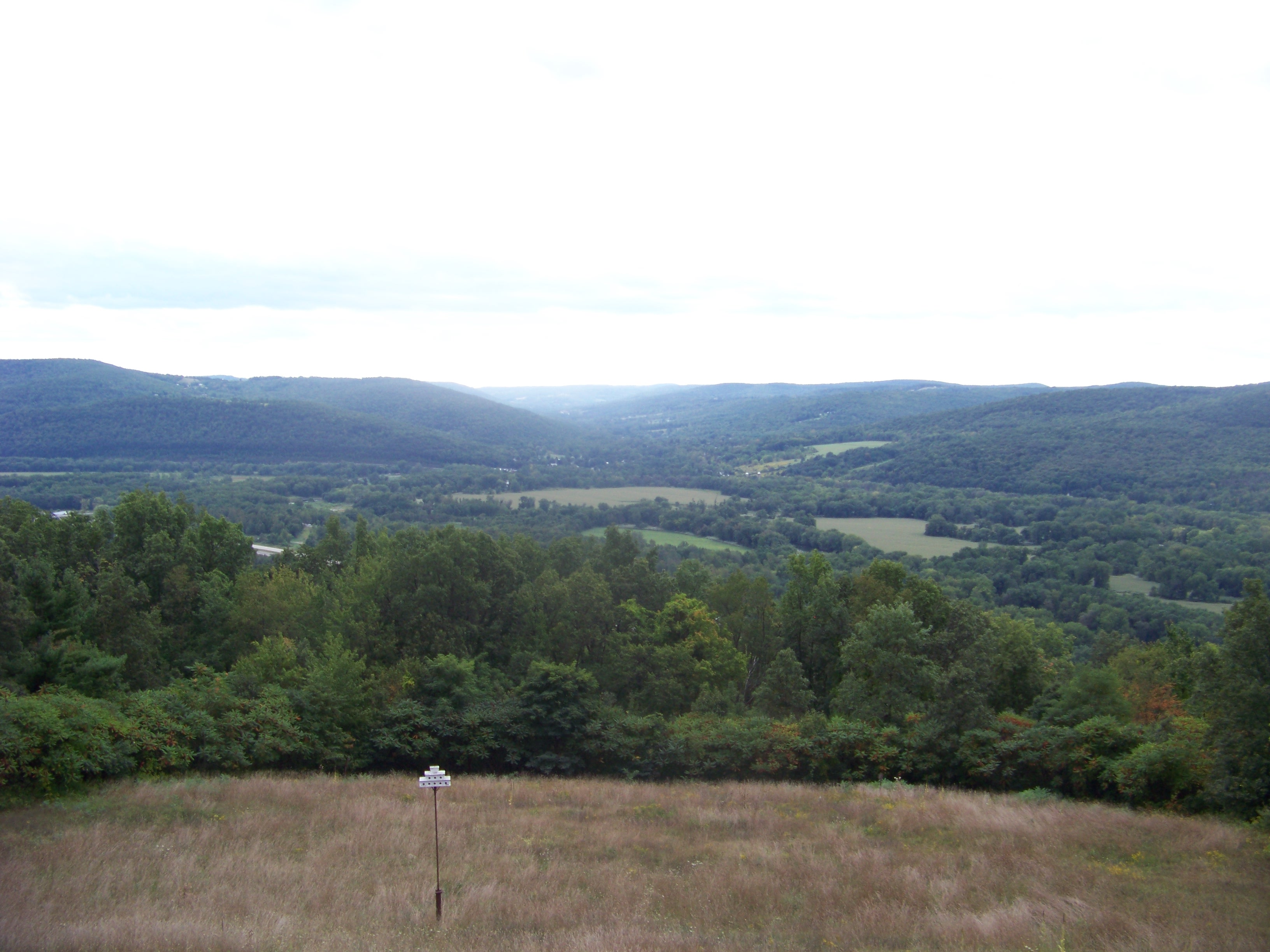
View from the summit of Sullivan Hill, looking into Hoffman Hollow

On August 26, 1779, Sullivan left Fort Sullivan, where the two columns of his army had converged, with an estimated 3,200 well-armed troops. They marched slowly up the Chemung River with the intention of destroying the towns and crops of the Six Nations in central New York. On the morning of Sunday, August 29, about ten miles upriver from Fort Sullivan, the advance guard, three companies of riflemen formerly with the Provisional Rifle Corps of Colonel Daniel Morgan, drew close to Butler's position. Suspecting an ambush, they halted and scouted the area. They discovered the hidden breastwork and immediately notified Brigadier General Edward Hand. Hand dispatched his light infantry to take up firing positions behind the bank of Baldwin Creek. The defenders made several unsuccessful attempts at luring the Continentals into an ambush. As the extended army continued to arrive and assemble, Sullivan called a council of war with his brigade commanders. Together they devised a plan of attack.

The 1st New Jersey Regiment, commanded by Colonel Matthias Ogden, was detached from Brigadier General William Maxwell's New Jersey Brigade and sent west along the Chemung River to a position on Major Butler's right flank. Similarly, the New York Brigade of Brigadier General James Clinton and the New Hampshire Brigade of Brigadier General Enoch Poor were dispatched together eastward, along a circuitous route through Hoffman Hollow, with the mission of approaching the hill's northeastern flank. At the end of the first hour, the artillery of six three-pounders, two howitzers, and a coehorn posted on a rise near the path, would open fire on the breastwork. The guns would signal Hand to feint an attack upon the center of the horseshoe, at which time the brigades to the northeast would climb the hill and pivot left to attack the rear of the breastwork. When the guns of Poor's and Clinton's attack were heard by Hand, his brigade would storm the works, supported by Maxwell's brigade, putting the defenders in a crossfire.

The plan was complex and conceived on short notice but the ultimate result was a defeat for Butler's Rangers and their Indigenous allies. Crossing the swampy marsh (which Sullivan termed a "morass") in Hoffman Hollow slowed the advance of Poor's and Clinton's brigades, disrupting the timing of the plan, and this provided just enough delay to allow Butler and the Haudenosaunee to escape along the crest of the hill. The artillery barrage opened well before Poor and Clinton were in position which forced the Rangers and Haudenosaunee back from the breastwork before they could be encircled. While some of the defenders turned and ran, the main body of Butler's forces skirmished with the Americans as they withdrew.

Nearly all of the Continentals' casualties occurred during a counterattack on Lieutenant Colonel George Reid's 2nd New Hampshire Regiment. Assigned to the extreme left of Poor's assault formation, the regiment climbed where the slope was steepest and lagged considerably behind the rest of the brigade. Joseph Brant led the assault and nearly encircled Reid. The next regiment in line, the 3rd New Hampshire Regiment of Lieutenant Colonel Henry Dearborn, about-faced, fired two volleys and advanced back down the hill to assist Reid, as did two of Clinton's regiments. The counterattack was turned back, however, it allowed the bulk of Butler's forces to escape.

After razing two Delaware villages and destroying all crops in the vicinity, Sullivan's army turned north and over the next three weeks destroyed at least 40 hastily abandoned Seneca and Cayuga villages before returning to Fort Sullivan.

== Sullivan's casualties ==
Sources differ as to the number of American casualties. Captain James Norris of the 3rd New Hampshire recorded three dead and 36 wounded during the battle. In his report to George Washington, General Sullivan also reported three dead but increased the number of wounded to 39. Five of the wounded died from their wounds within three weeks of the battle bringing the total to eight dead.

Dead:

- Lieutenant Nathaniel McCauley (died August 30 following amputation of his leg)
- Private Abner Dearborn (nephew of Lieutenant Colonel Henry Dearborn died September 2)
- Sergeant Demeret and Corporal Hunter
- Josiah Mitchell, Sylvester Williams and two other privates.

Wounded:

- Major Benjamin Titcomb
- Capt. Elijah Clayes (died November 30, 1779)
- Sgt. Oliver Thurston
- 28 additional wounded

== Haudenosaunee and British casualties ==
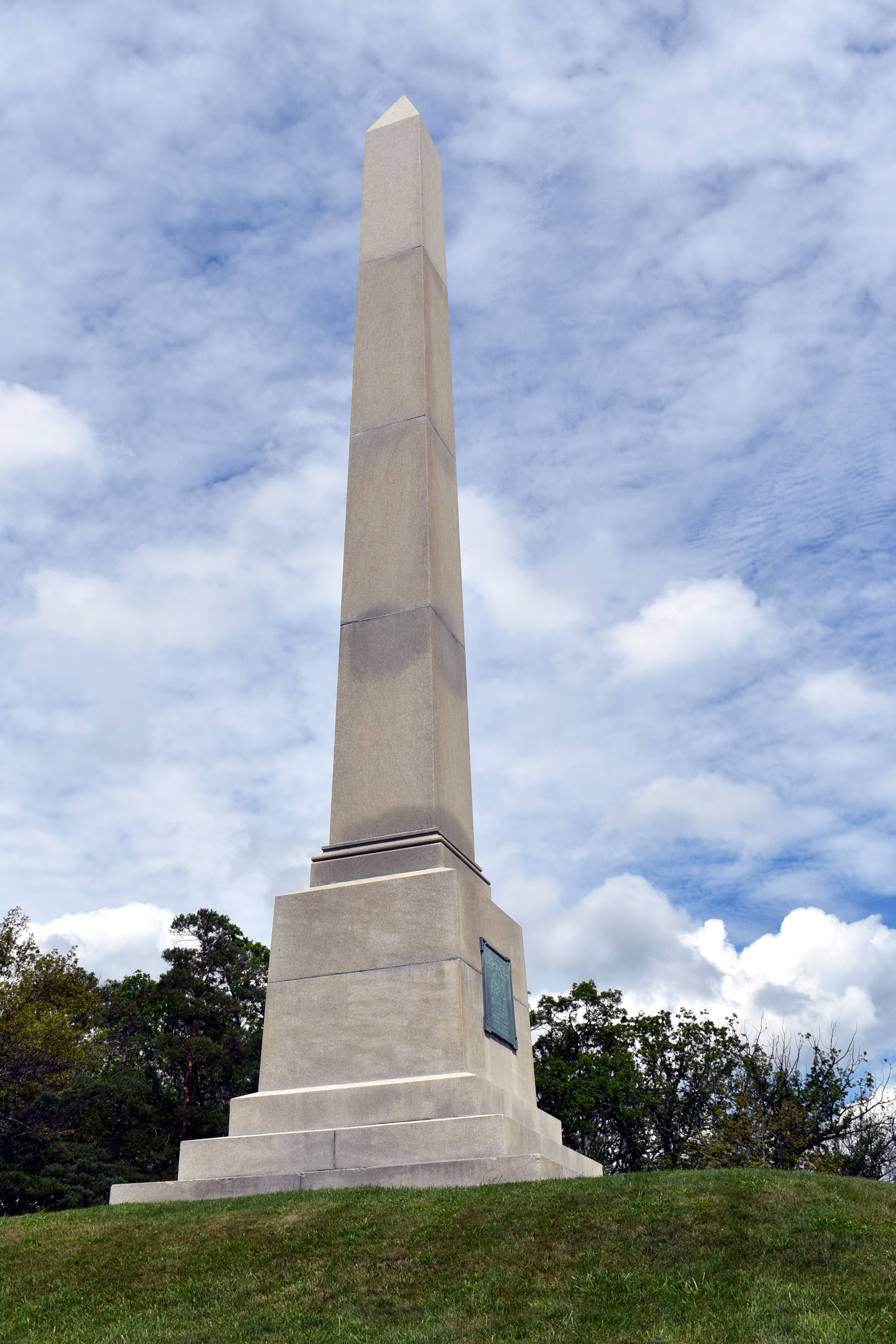
Monument constructed in 1912 and located in Newtown Battlefield State Park

Major Butler reported five of his Rangers killed or taken and three wounded as well as five killed and nine wounded among the Haudenosaunee. American sources reported two prisoners taken, and twelve dead natives including a woman.

== Legacy ==
In 1973 the Newtown Battlefield National Historic Landmark was established by the federal government, recognizing its significant history. The Landmark encompasses nearly 2,100 acres (850 hectares) in the towns of Ashland, Chemung and Elmira. Today, the site of the battle is partially obscured by the Wellsburg exit of Interstate 86 and New York State Route 17. Several roadside signs in the vicinity of the interchange mark various troop locations.

To commemorate the battle's 100th anniversary in 1879, a small parcel of land atop what is now known as Sullivan Hill was donated to create Newtown Battlefield Park. A 40 foot (12 m) fieldstone tower was built. This tower collapsed during a thunderstorm on August 30, 1911. That same year, 15 acres (6.1 hectares) of land including the park was deeded to the State of New York and named the Newtown Battlefield Reservation. A new 80 foot (24 m) granite obelisk monument was erected and dedicated in 1912. Further expansion eventually resulted in the creation of the 372 acres (1.51 km^{2}) Newtown Battlefield State Park.

The American Battlefield Trust and its partners have acquired and preserved an additional 68 acres (28 hectares) of the battlefield adjacent to the Newtown Battlefield State Park. In an effort to incorporate the Newtown Battlefield site into the National Park System, Congressional resolution H.R. 6866, which directed Secretary of the Interior Dirk Kempthorne to conduct a special resource study to evaluate the significance of the Newtown Battlefield and the suitability and feasibility of its inclusion in the National Parks System, was put forth for consideration by Congressman Randy Kuhl. The bill stalled in January 2009 after being referred to the Subcommittee on National Parks, Forests and Public Lands.
