= Canajoharie Raid =

- Part of the American Revolutionary War
Date	August 2, 1780
Location	Fort Plain and Canajoharie, New York

Belligerents
Great Britain; Seneca; Cayuga; Mohawk Tuscarora	United States

Commanders and leaders
Joseph Brant; Sayenqueraghta; Cornplanter; Fish Carrier Joseph Clement	Robert Van Rensselaer Col. Abraham Wemple

Units involved
Brant's Volunteers Butler's Rangers	Albany County Militia Tryon County militia

Strength
300 Loyalists and Haudenosaunee	unknown

Casualties and losses
unknown	16-17 settlers killed 52 prisoners taken 53 houses & ~50 barns burned ~300 cattle and horses chased or killed

The Canajoharie Raid or Canajoharie Massacre was an attack on the Canajoharie District of Tryon County, New York by Loyalist and Haudenosaunee forces during the American Revolutionary War. The raid was one of several scorched-earth campaigns undertaken by the British and their allies against the frontier settlements of the Mohawk Valley. The settlements attacked were in the vicinity of present-day Fort Plain and Canajoharie, New York.

== Background ==
In May of 1780, Sir John Johnson and his forces successfully destroyed the Caughnawaga District, downstream from Canajoharie on the Mohwak River. That attack was successful in breaking up the scattered frontier settlements and further campaigns were designed to force the settlers to abandon the Mohawk valley. On July 11, Captain Joseph Brant and Lieut. Joseph Clement embarked from Fort Niagara with about 300 warriors, and by the end of the month, had an unsuccessful blockade of Fort Stanwix. The forces, reported by then to number over 800 mobilized General Robert Van Rensselaer of the Albany County militia to organize his brigade and march to relieve the fort.

== Raid ==
On August 2, 1780, Brant's forces reached the Canajoharie district having flanked General Rensselaer's relief column. The forces were composed of warriors of the Seneca, Cayuga, Mohawk, and Tuscarora nations and the high-ranking chiefs, Sayenqueraghta, Cornplanter and Fish Carrier. They laid waist to the most prosperous section of the settlement, reportedly in retaliation for the burning of numerous Mohawk farms after the Battle of Oriskany, three years prior. The party took 52 prisoners and about 16 or 17 settlers were killed. It was reported that some of the bodies of men and children were mutilated. The raiders burned 53 homes and as many barns, along with crops, grain stores, a church, grist mill, and two forts. About 300 cattle and horses were also driven off or killed.

That morning Colonel Abraham Wemple with his 2nd Regiment of Albany County Militia as well as the 1st Regiment, guarding batteaux bound for Fort Stanwix. Marching upstream along the south bank of the Mohawk River that morning, and four miles from Abeel Island, he was alarmed by the smoke. Col. Wemple ordered both regiments into formation and to engage with the enemy. Despite being outnumbered and exhausted from a long march, Wemple's troops came upon their enemy with "such vigor" and the raiders withdrew. The militia was not able to engage Brant's raiders in battle, and there were no reports of wounded for either combatants.

== Aftermath ==
The settlements around Fort Plain were destroyed and almost nothing remained with which the settlers could survive. Not only were families broken up, but their homes, barns, livestock, grain stores, and farming implements were destroyed.

Brant's forces continued and subsequently destroyed Vrooman's Land in the Schoharie Valley the following week.
