= Isaac Morrison =

- Born: 1745; Somerset, New Jersey
- Died: Unknown
- Military career
- Allegiance: United States
- Branch: Continental Army
- Rank: captain
- Unit: 1st New Jersey Regiment
- Conflicts: American Revolutionary War: Battle of Germantown; Battle of Monmouth

Isaac Morrison (born c. 1745) was a captain during the American Revolutionary War, in the 1st New Jersey Regiment. He served under Matthias Ogden and testified at his court martial.
