= Smoke Creek (New York) =

Stream in Erie County, New York, United States

Coordinates: 42°48′40″N 78°51′54″W

Smoke Creek (also known as Da-deo-da-na-suk-to ("bend in the shore"), Smoke's Creek or Smokes Creek) is a small stream in Erie County, New York. It originates southwest of East Aurora and flows into Lake Erie at Lackawanna. The height above sea level is 174 metres (571 ft). A left tributary is the South Branch Smoke Creek. The watershed area of Smoke Creek measures about 85 square kilometres (33 sq mi).

The creek is named after "Old Smoke," the English name for Sayenqueraghta, a prominent Seneca chief.

== Water quality ==
In a 2010 report by the New York State Department of Environmental Conservation (DEC), Smoke Creek was found to have "slightly impacted water quality conditions" primarily caused by "past industrial activities and discharges including sludge banks along the creek." However, "aquatic life and recreational uses are considered to be fully supported in the stream."
