= Newtown Battlefield State Park =

- Newtown Battlefield
- U.S. National Register of Historic Places
- U.S. National Historic Landmark
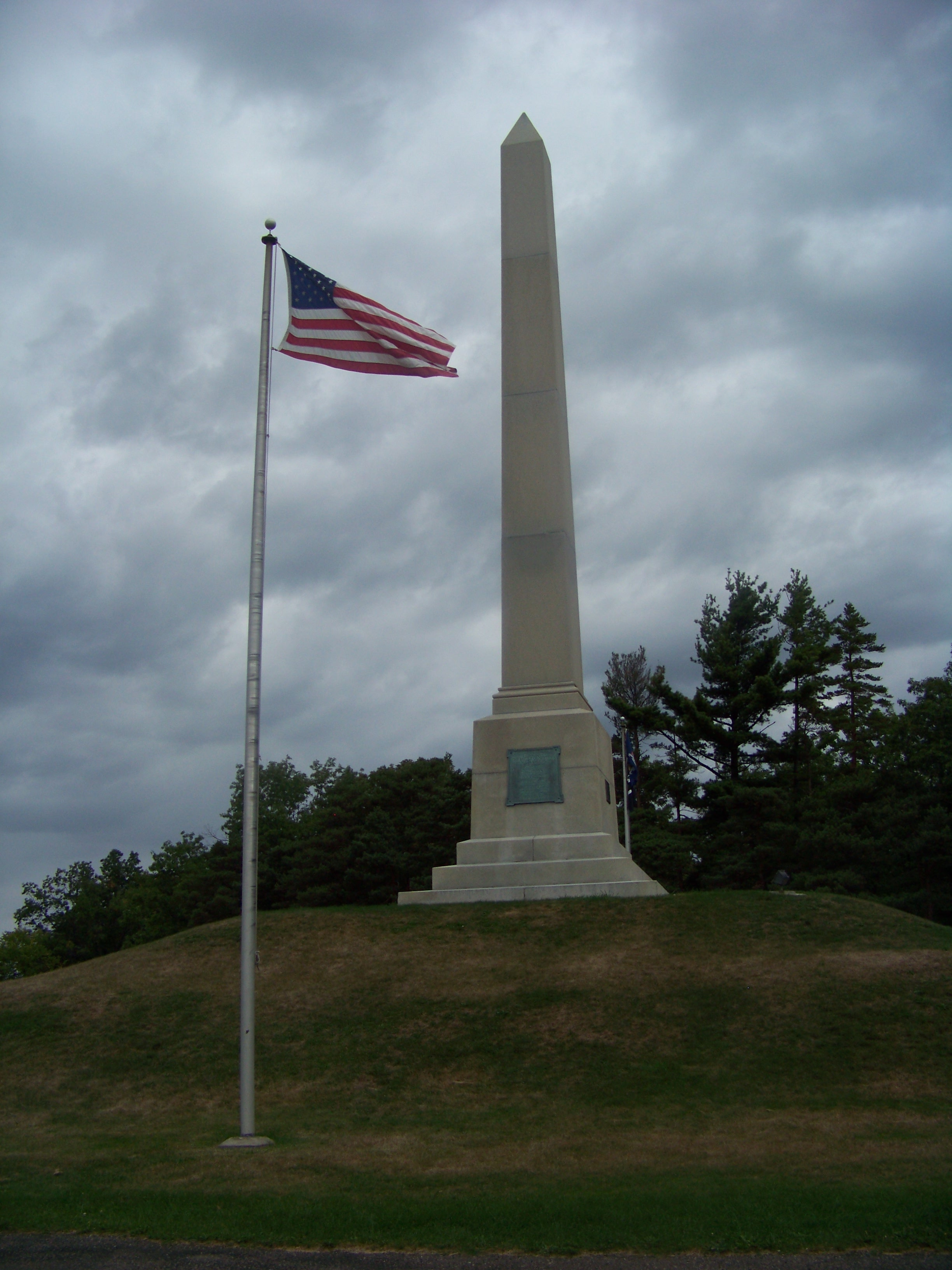

- Location within New York Location within the United States
- Location: 451 Oneida Road, Elmira, New York
- Coordinates: 42°2′43″N 76°44′0″W
- Area: 2,100 acres (850 ha)
- Built: 1779
- NRHP reference No.: 72000826

Significant dates
- Added to NRHP: 28 November 1972
- Designated NHL: 28 November 28, 1972

Newtown Battlefield State Park, formerly known as Newtown Battlefield Reservation, was the site of the Battle of Newtown fought in August 1779, during the American Revolutionary War. It was the only major battle of the Sullivan Expedition, an armed offensive led by General John Sullivan that was ordered by the Continental Congress to end the threat of the Haudenosaunee who had sided with the British in the American Revolutionary War. In the battle, the Haudenosaunee were defeated decisively. A portion of the battlefield is today managed as a 372-acre (1.51 km^{2}) state park. The entire battlefield (about 2,100 acres (850 ha)) was declared a National Historic Landmark in 1965. The American Battlefield Trust and its partners have acquired and preserved more than 68 acres adjacent to the state park.

== Description and history ==
The Newtown Battlefield is located along the eastern bank of the Chemung River, in western New York southeast of Elmira. Its main focus is Sullivan Hill, a 1,400-foot (430 m) wooded hill that was fortified by the Haudenosaunee in a bid to ambush Sullivan's column. The main trail followed by Sullivan's troops had to pass near the steep hillside, which was only 1,000 feet (300 m) from the river. Sullivan's advance forces discovered the Haudenosaunee works, and Sullivan set up his artillery on a rise to the south, from which it could command not just Sullivan Hill but also another hill to the east. After cannonading the Haudenosaunee position, Sullivan sent troops up Baldwin Creek, which skirts the hill to the east. These forces eventually formed a battle line that drove the Haudenosaunee from the position.

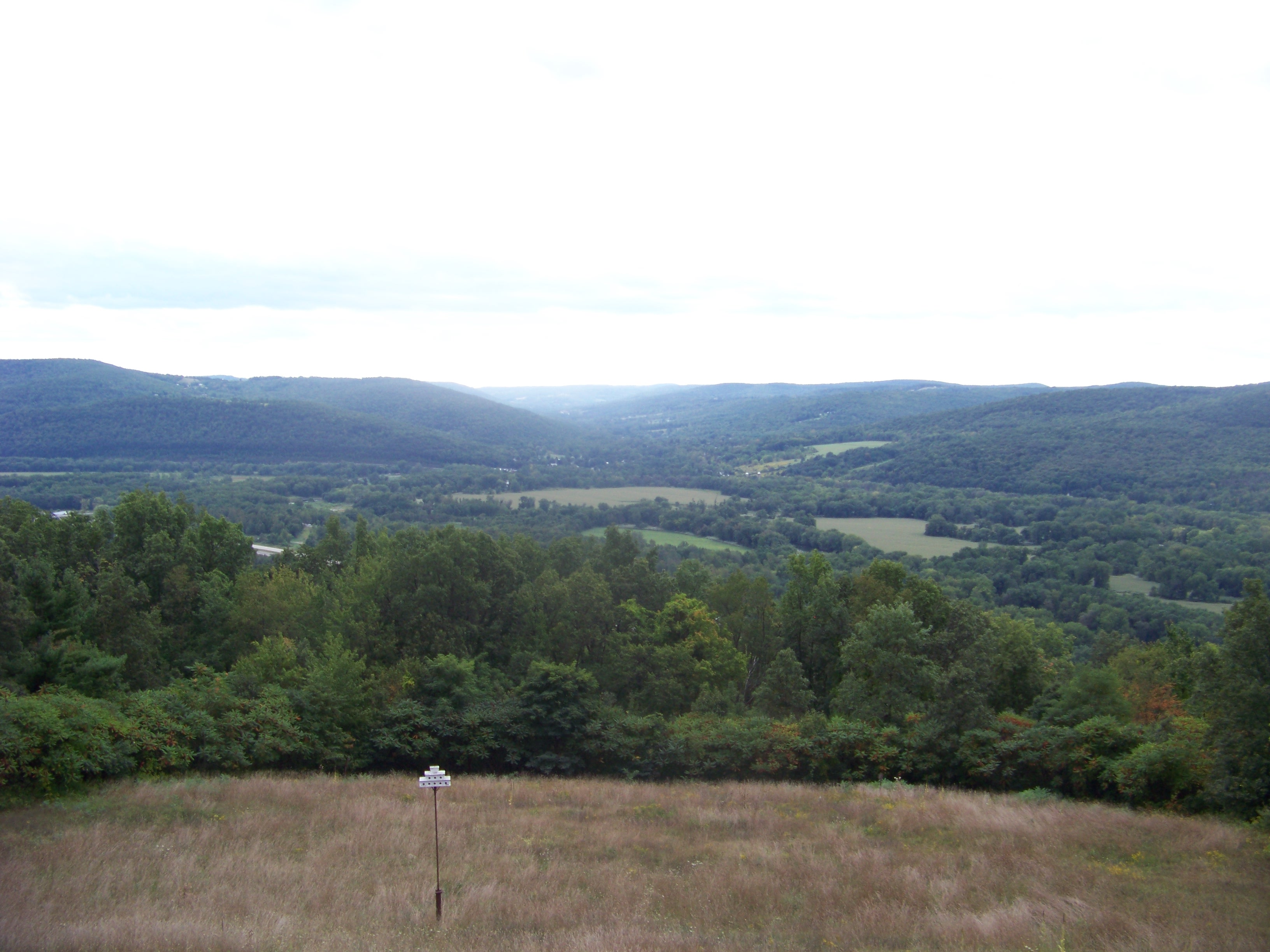
View from the hill below the Newtown Battlefield Monument

The state acquired 330 acres (130 ha) of land, covering most of Sullivan Hill, which it managed first as a state reservation, and then as a state park. A narrow column of white granite known as the Newton Battlefield Monument was erected on top of Sullivan Hill in 1912.

On January 19, 2010, New York State Governor David Paterson proposed closing the park to reduce the state's growing budget deficit. However, the park was allowed to remain open after budget adjustments were made throughout the state's park system.

== See also ==
- List of New York state parks
- List of National Historic Landmarks in New York
