= Sullivan Expedition =

Campaign during the American Revolutionary War

- Part of the American Revolutionary War
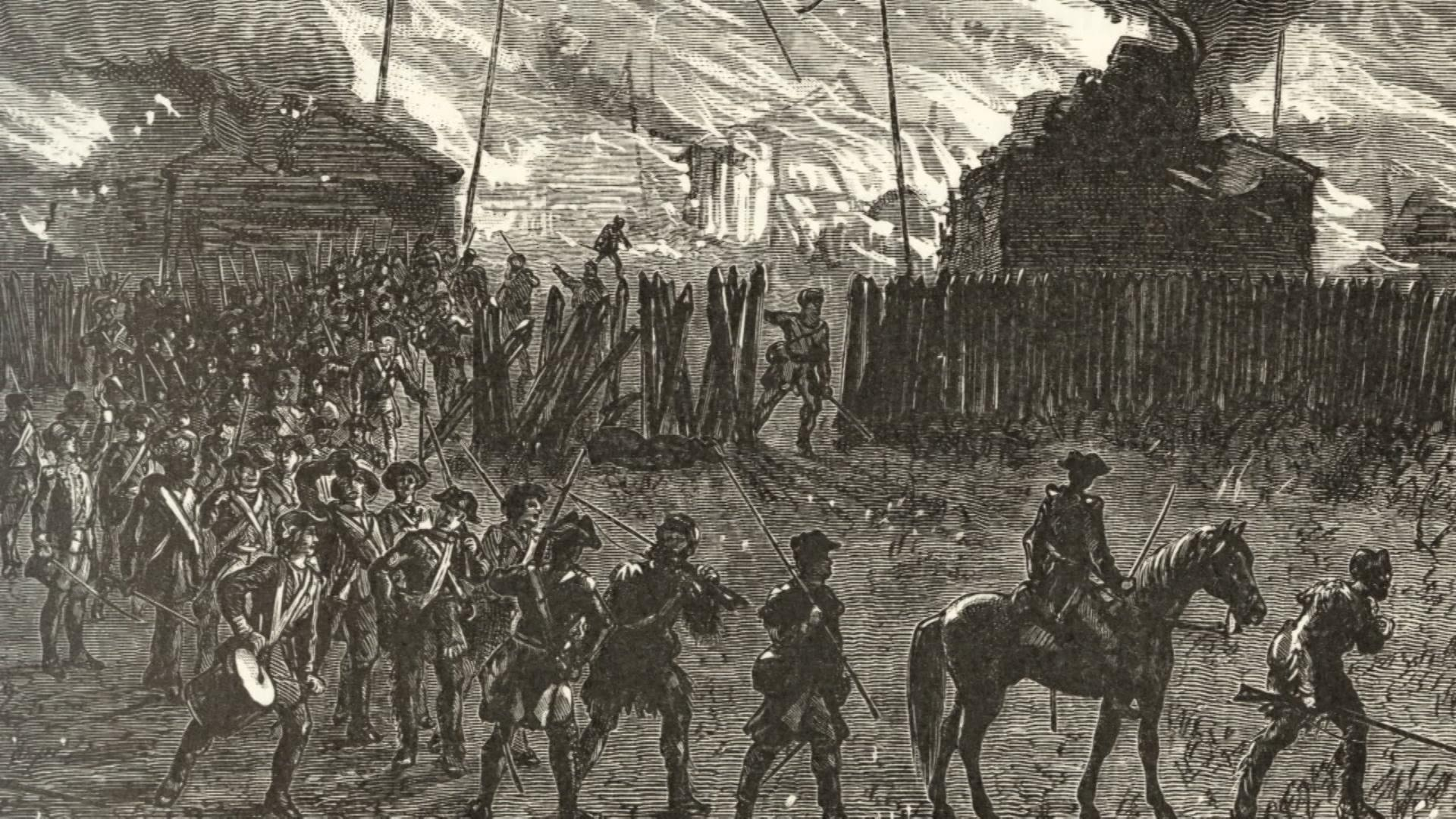
- Woodcut print of the Battle of Newtown
Date	June 18 – October 3, 1779
Location	Upstate New York and Northeastern Pennsylvania
Result	American victory

Belligerents
Haudenosaunee; Great Britain	United States

Commanders and leaders
Sayenqueraghta; Cornplanter; Joseph Brant; Little Beard; John Butler	John Sullivan; James Clinton; Edward Hand; Enoch Poor; William Maxwell; Daniel Brodhead

Strength
~1,000 Indigenous; 200–250 Butler's Rangers	~4,500

Casualties and losses
3 Rangers dead, 2 captured, 3 wounded ~200 Indigenous dead	40 dead
- ~5,000 Indigenous refugees; several hundred Indigenous deaths from starvation, exposure and disease

The Sullivan Expedition (also known as the Sullivan-Clinton Expedition, the Sullivan Campaign, and the Sullivan-Clinton Campaign) was a United States military campaign under the command of General John Sullivan during the American Revolutionary War, lasting from June to October 1779, against the four British-allied tribes of the Haudenosaunee (Iroquois) Confederacy.

The campaign was ordered by George Washington in response to the Haudenosaunee and Loyalist destruction of American settlements in the Wyoming Valley, and Cherry Valley. The campaign had the aim of "the total destruction and devastation of their settlements." Four Continental Army brigades carried out a scorched-earth campaign in the territory of the Haudenosaunee Confederacy in what is now central New York.

The expedition was largely successful, with 40 Haudenosaunee villages razed and their crops and food stores destroyed. The campaign drove just over 5,000 Haudenosaunee to Fort Niagara seeking British protection, and depopulated the area for post-war settlement. Some scholars argue that it was an attempt to annihilate the Haudenosaunee and describe the campaign as a genocide, although this term is disputed. Today this area is the heartland of Upstate New York, with thirty-five monoliths marking the path of Sullivan's troops and the locations of the Haudenosaunee villages they razed dotting the region, having been erected by the New York State Education Department in 1929 to commemorate the 150th anniversary of the expedition.

== Overview ==
Led by Major General John Sullivan and Brigadier General James Clinton, the expedition was conducted during the summer of 1779, beginning on June 18 when the army marched from Easton, Pennsylvania, to October 3 when it abandoned Fort Sullivan, built at Tioga, to return to George Washington's main camp in New Jersey. While the campaign had only one major battle at Newtown on the Chemung River in western New York, the expedition severely damaged the Haudenosaunee nations' economies by destroying their crops, villages, and possessions. The death toll from exposure, starvation and disease the following winter dwarfed the casualties received in the Battle of Newtown, during which Sullivan's army of 3,200 Continental soldiers decisively defeated about 600 Haudenosaunee and Loyalists.

In response to 1778 attacks by Haudenosaunee and Loyalists on American settlements, such as on Cobleskill, German Flatts, the Wyoming Valley and Cherry Valley, as well as Haudenosaunee support of the British during the 1777 Battles of Saratoga, Sullivan's army carried out a scorched-earth campaign to put an end to Haudenosaunee attacks. The American force methodically destroyed 40 Haudenosaunee villages throughout the Finger Lakes region of western New York. Thousands of Indigenous refugees fled to Fort Niagara on Lake Ontario at the mouth of the Niagara River. The devastation created great hardship for those who sheltered under British military protection outside Fort Niagara that winter, and many starved or froze to death, despite efforts by the British authorities to supply food and provide shelter using their limited resources.

== Background ==
When the Revolutionary War began, British officials, as well as the colonial Continental Congress, sought the allegiance (or at least the neutrality) of the Haudenosaunee Confederacy, also known as the Six Nations. The Haudenosaunee eventually divided over what course to pursue. Most Senecas, Cayugas, Onondagas, and Mohawks chose to ally themselves with the British. Most Oneidas and Tuscaroras joined the American revolutionaries, thanks in part to the influence of Presbyterian missionary Samuel Kirkland.

The Haudenosaunee homeland lay on the frontier between the Province of Quebec and the provinces of New York and Pennsylvania. Following the October 1777 surrender of British General John Burgoyne's forces after the Battles of Saratoga, Loyalists and their Haudenosaunee allies began raiding American frontier settlements, as well as the villages of the Oneida. From a base at Fort Niagara, men such as Loyalist commander Major John Butler, Mohawk military leader Joseph Brant, and Seneca war chiefs Sayenqueraghta and Cornplanter led the joint British-Indigenous raids.

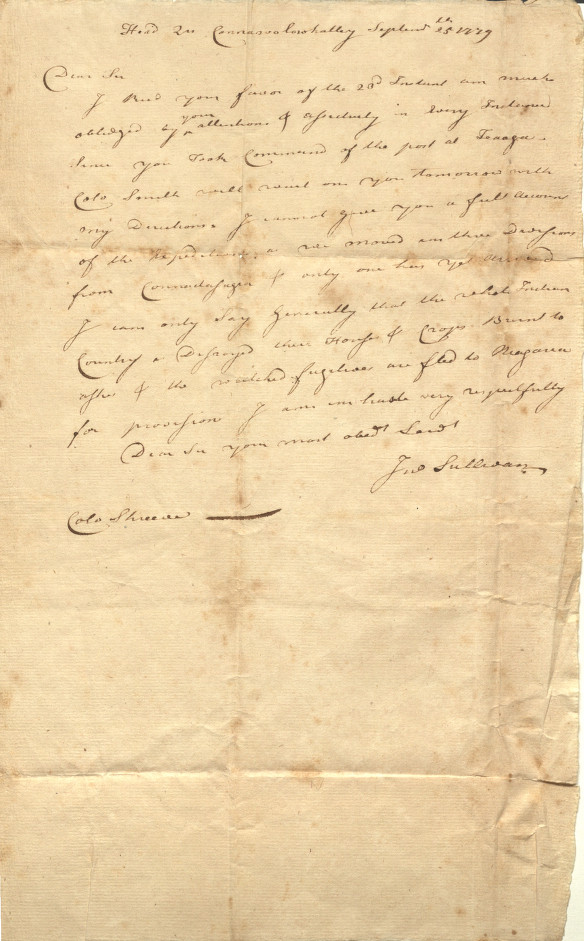
Letter from John Sullivan, 1779

On May 30, 1778, a raid on Cobleskill by Brant's Volunteers resulted in the deaths of 22 regulars and militia. On June 10, 1778, the Board of War of the Continental Congress concluded that a major Indian war was in the offing. Since a defensive war would prove inadequate, the board called for an expedition of 3,000 men against Fort Detroit and a similar thrust into Seneca country to punish the Haudenosaunee. Congress designated Major General Horatio Gates to lead the expedition and appropriated funds for the campaign. Despite these efforts, the campaign did not occur until the following year.

On July 3, 1778, Butler, Sayenqueraghta and Cornplanter led a mixed force of Indigenous warriors and Rangers in an attack on the Wyoming Valley, a rebel granary and settlement along the north branch of the Susquehanna River in what is now Pennsylvania. Roughly 300 of the armed Patriot defenders were killed at the Battle of Wyoming, after which houses, barns, and mills were razed throughout the valley.

In September 1778, a response to the Wyoming defeat was undertaken by Colonel Thomas Hartley who destroyed a number of abandoned Delaware and Seneca villages along the Susquehanna River, including Tioga. At the same time, Joseph Brant led an attack on German Flatts in the Mohawk Valley, destroying numerous houses, barns and mills. In October, further American retaliation was taken by Continental Army units under Lieutenant Colonel William Butler who destroyed the substantial Indigenous villages at Unadilla and Onaquaga on the Susquehanna River.

On November 11, 1778, Loyalist Captain Walter Butler (the son of John Butler) led two companies of Butler's Rangers, a detachment of the 8th Regiment of Foot, about 300 Seneca and Cayuga led by Cornplanter, and a small group of Mohawks led by Joseph Brant, on an assault at Cherry Valley in New York. While the rangers and regulars blockaded Fort Alden, the Seneca rampaged through the village, killing and scalping 16 soldiers and 32 civilians, mostly women and children, and taking 80 captives. In less than a year, Butler's Rangers and their Haudenosaunee allies had reduced much of upstate New York and northeastern Pennsylvania to ruins, causing thousands of settlers to flee and depriving the Continental Army of food.

The Cherry Valley massacre convinced the Americans that they needed to take action. In April 1779, Colonel Goose Van Schaick led an expedition of 558 Continental Army troops against the Onondaga people. About 50 houses and a large quantity of corn and beans were burned. Van Schaick reported that they took "thirty three Indians and one white man prisoner, and killed twelve Indians." Despite Van Schaick's superior James Clinton ordering him to prevent his soldiers from assaulting any Onondaga women (noting that "Bad as the savages are, they never violate the chastity of any women"), the Americans committed numerous atrocities during the expedition. American soldiers "killed babies and raped women", and an Onondaga chief recounted to the British in 1782 how the Americans "put to death all the Women and Children, excepting some of the Young Women, whom they carried away for the use of their Soldiers & were afterwards put to death in a more shameful manner".

When the British began to concentrate their military efforts on the southern colonies in 1779, Washington used the opportunity to launch a major offensive against the British-allied Haudenosaunee. His initial impulse was to assign the expedition to Major General Charles Lee, however, Lee as well as Major General Philip Schuyler and Major General Israel Putnam were all disregarded for various reasons. Washington offered command of the expedition to Horatio Gates, the "Hero of Saratoga," but Gates turned down the offer, ostensibly for health reasons. Finally, Major General John Sullivan accepted command.

Washington's issued his specific orders in a letter to Sullivan on May 31, 1779:

The Expedition you are appointed to command is to be directed against the hostile tribes of the Six Nations of Indians, with their associates and adherents. The immediate objects are the total destruction and devastation of their settlements, and the capture of as many prisoners of every age and sex as possible. It will be essential to ruin their crops now in the ground and prevent their planting more....

I would recommend, that some post in the center of the Indian Country, should be occupied with all expedition, with a sufficient quantity of provisions whence parties should be detached to lay waste all the settlements around, with instructions to do it in the most effectual manner, that the country may not be merely overrun, but destroyed....

But you will not by any means listen to overture of peace before the total ruin of their settlements is effected. It is likely enough their fears if they are unable to oppose us, will compel them to offers of peace, or policy may lead them, to endeavour to amuse us in this way to gain time and succour for more effectual opposition. Our future security will be in their inability to injure us the distance to which they are driven and in the terror with which the severity of the chastisement they receive will inspire....

== Expedition ==
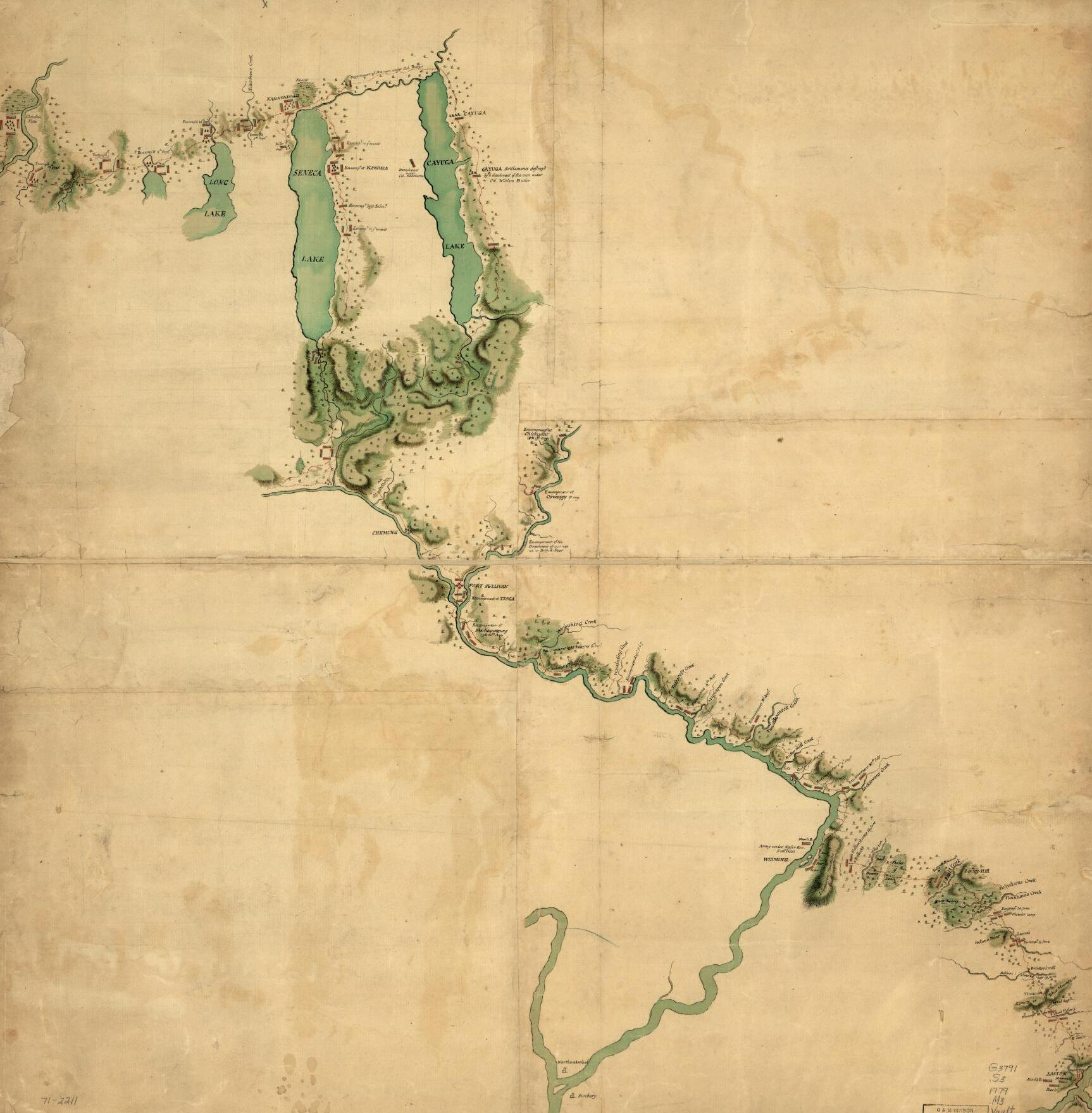
Map showing the route of the Sullivan Expedition in 1779

The expedition was one of the largest campaigns of the Continental Army, involving more than one third of its soldiers. Sullivan was assigned four Continental Army brigades totalling 4,469 men. By the time the expedition set out this number had fallen to just under 4,000 due to disease, desertions and expired enlistments.

In April 1779, Edward Hand's brigade was ordered from Minisink to the Wyoming Valley to establish a base camp for the expedition. In May 1779, the brigades of Enoch Poor and William Maxwell assembled at Easton where they were joined by Sullivan and Thomas Proctor's 4th Artillery Regiment. Before they could proceed to Wyoming a road had to be hewn through the wilderness between the Delaware and Susquehanna rivers. The road was completed in mid-June and Sullivan's forces arrived at Wyoming on June 23 after a five-day march. A number of smaller units, including three companies of Morgan's Riflemen, joined the expedition at Wyoming.

Supply shortages delayed Sullivan's departure from Wyoming until July 31 when the expedition set out for Tioga at the confluence of the Chemung and Susquehanna rivers. The expedition proceeded cautiously, slowed by the mountainous terrain and the need to keep abreast of the 134 flatboats carrying Sullivan's artillery and supplies up the Susquehanna. With the expedition were 1,200 pack horses, 700 head of cattle, four brass three-pound cannons, two six-pound cannons, two 5½-inch howitzers, and one coehorn. The expedition arrived at Tioga on August 11 and construction began on a temporary fort that was named Fort Sullivan.

=== Battle of Chemung ===
After arriving at Tioga, Sullivan dispatched a small party to reconnoitre Chemung, a Delaware village 12 miles (19 km) upstream, where he believed Indigenous and Loyalist forces were gathering. When the scouts returned they reported the presence of a large number of "both white people and Indians" in "great confusion" but were unable to tell if the enemy were preparing to fight or depart. Sullivan decided an immediate attack was warranted. Leaving behind a garrison of 250 at Tioga, Sullivan's forces marched overnight and arrived at Chemung at dawn on August 13. They discovered that the village had been hastily abandoned. While Poor's soldiers torched the village and destroyed the crops in the surrounding fields, Hand's brigade searched for traces of the escaped villagers. About a mile west of the village, a detachment of the 11th Pennsylvania Regiment was ambushed by 30 Delaware led by Roland Montour. The Continentals were able to counterattack and force the Delaware to retreat but suffered six killed and 12 wounded. Later a detachment of the 1st New Hampshire Regiment was fired upon while destroying crops on the opposite side of the river, killing one and wounding four. Sullivan's forces withdrew from Chemung that afternoon and returned to the encampment at Tioga after nightfall.

=== Clinton's brigade ===
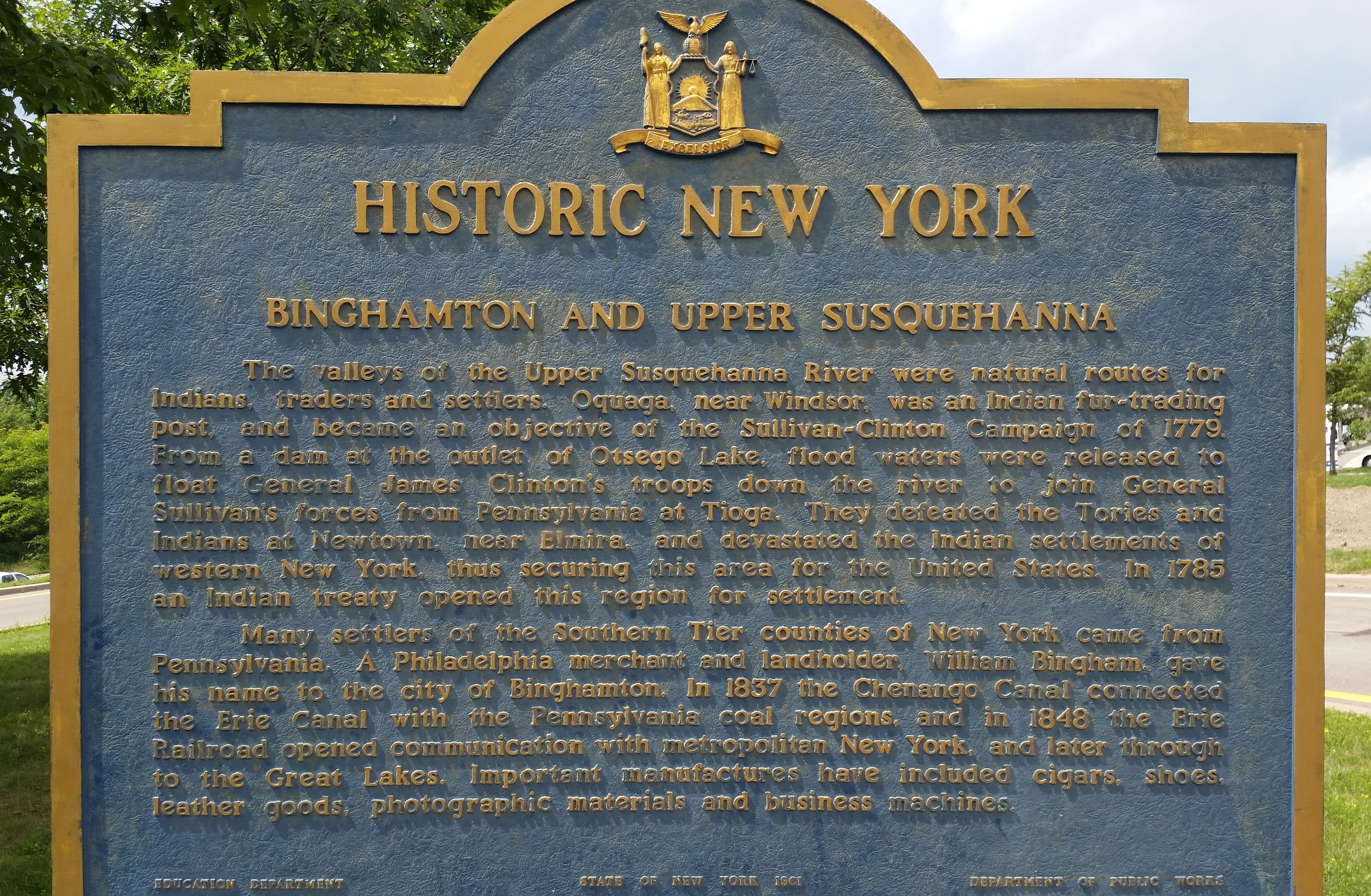
Historic marker, Kirkwood, New York

The fourth brigade, commanded by James Clinton, assembled at Canojaharie on the Mohawk River. A 24 miles (39 km) road was cut through the forest from the Mohawk River to Otsego Lake, the source of the Susquehanna River. For six days in June, wagons trundled back and forth carrying supplies and 208 flatboats to the head of the lake. The supplies were then loaded onto the boats and ferried across. Clinton established his headquarters at the south end of the lake in early July and waited for Sullivan's order to march.

Clinton received the order to start for Tioga on August 9. Due to low water levels on the Susquehanna, Clinton had ordered the construction of a dam that had raised the water level on Otsego Lake by 2 feet (0.61 m). The boats, laden with supplies, were hauled to the shallows below the dam. The dam was breached and the boats were able to float downriver, paced by Clinton's soldiers marching along both banks.

Clinton reached Unadilla on August 12, and Oquaga two days later. Both villages had been destroyed by William Butler a year earlier. After a two-day rest, Clinton's brigade continued downriver, burning abandoned hamlets and scattered farms. On August 19, they reached the mouth of Choconut Creek where a large detachment from Poor's and Hand's brigades was waiting to escort them to Tioga. Clinton entered Sullivan's camp on August 22.

=== Battle of Newtown ===
The expedition departed Fort Sullivan on August 26, and cautiously headed up the Chemung River valley. In the early morning of August 29, Sullivan's advance guard discovered a camouflaged, half-mile long breastwork of logs. The breastwork was manned by Butler's Rangers, Brant's Volunteers, a detachment of the 8th Regiment of Foot, and about 350 Seneca, Cayuga and Delaware warriors. Sullivan had Hand's brigade form a line of battle facing the breastwork while Proctor's artillery was positioned on a nearby rise. Poor's New Hampshire Brigade and Clinton's New York Brigade were ordered to circle around to the right and climb the steep hill to the enemy's rear.

Poor and Clinton were given an hour to move into position. When the artillery opened fire the plan was for Hand to feint a frontal attack on the breastwork while Poor and Clinton attacked from behind. Maxwell's brigade was kept in reserve except for the 1st New Jersey which moved to cut off any retreat along the river. The guns, however, opened fire well before Poor and Clinton reached their objective. Their route had taken them through a "morass" that slowed their progress. The British commander, Major John Butler, became aware that his position was in danger of being flanked and began a withdrawal. An attack by a group of Indigenous warriors against the 2nd New Hampshire, which was still struggling to ascend the hill, caused significant casualties and allowed the rest of Butler's forces to escape.

In his report to George Washington, Sullivan reported three dead and 39 wounded. Five of the wounded later succumbed to their injuries bringing the total to eight dead. Butler reported five of his Rangers killed or taken and three wounded as well as five killed and nine wounded among the Haudenosaunee. American sources reported two prisoners taken, and twelve Indigenous dead, including a woman.

=== Boyd and Parker ambush ===
Sullivan's force destroyed Newtown and several other abandoned Delaware villages along the Chemung River, then turned north towards Seneca Lake. After burning Queanettquaga (Catherine's Town), the home of Catherine Montour, the expedition headed up the east side of the lake and then west to Kanadaseaga, setting every structure on fire, destroying food stores and the crops in the fields, cutting down orchards, and fulfilling Washington's directive to cause "the total destruction and devastation of their settlements."

Following the destruction of Kanadaseaga, Sullivan's forces continued west towards the Genesee River and Chenussio, also known as Little Beard's Town. On September 12, after marching from Honeoye Lake, Sullivan's forces camped between Hemlock Lake and Conesus Lake. From there Sullivan dispatched Lieutenant Thomas Boyd of Morgan's Rifle Corps to reconnoiter Chenussio. Boyd took with him 26 riflemen including Sergeant Michael Parker, and Thaosagwat, an Oneida guide also known as Han Yost. The following morning Boyd's patrol reached an abandoned village which he believed was Chenussio. Meanwhile, about 200 Butler's Rangers led by John Butler and Seneca warriors led by Cornplanter and Little Beard, were preparing to ambush the vanguard of Sullivan's army as it emerged from the marshy area south of Conesus Lake, unaware that Boyd's patrol had unknowingly passed them in the night.

As Boyd's patrol kept watch for signs of enemy activity, four Seneca on horseback entered the village. One was killed but three escaped. Afraid that the gunfire would draw more of the enemy to the village, Boyd ordered a return to Sullivan's position. On the trail they spotted several more Seneca who fled. Thaosagwat warned Boyd not to give chase but the warning was ignored, and the patrol stumbled into the ambush. Surrounded and outnumbered, fourteen of Boyd's men were killed while Boyd, Parker and Thaosagwat were captured. Thaosagwat was immediately executed by Little Beard while Boyd and Parker were later tortured to death. The mutilated bodies of Boyd and Parker were discovered when Sullivan's forces entered Chenussio on September 14.

=== Return to Tioga ===
After destroying Chenussio's 128 houses with its gardens and cornfields, Sullivan retraced his steps, aware that provisions were growing short, and mistakenly believing there were no other Seneca villages west of the Genesee River. At the north end of Seneca Lake, Sullivan ordered William Butler with 600 men to cross over to Cayuga Lake and lay waste to the Cayuga villages on the eastern shore. Henry Dearborn and the 3rd New Hampshire were tasked with destroying the villages on the western shore of the lake while William Smith and the 5th New Jersey would burn any villages on the western shore of Seneca Lake.

Over the next five days, Bulter's and Dearborn's men leveled the two large Cayuga villages of Goiogouen and Chonodote, as well as smaller villages and hamlets. Coreorgonel, a village of Tutelo who had been adopted by the Cayuga, was also destroyed.

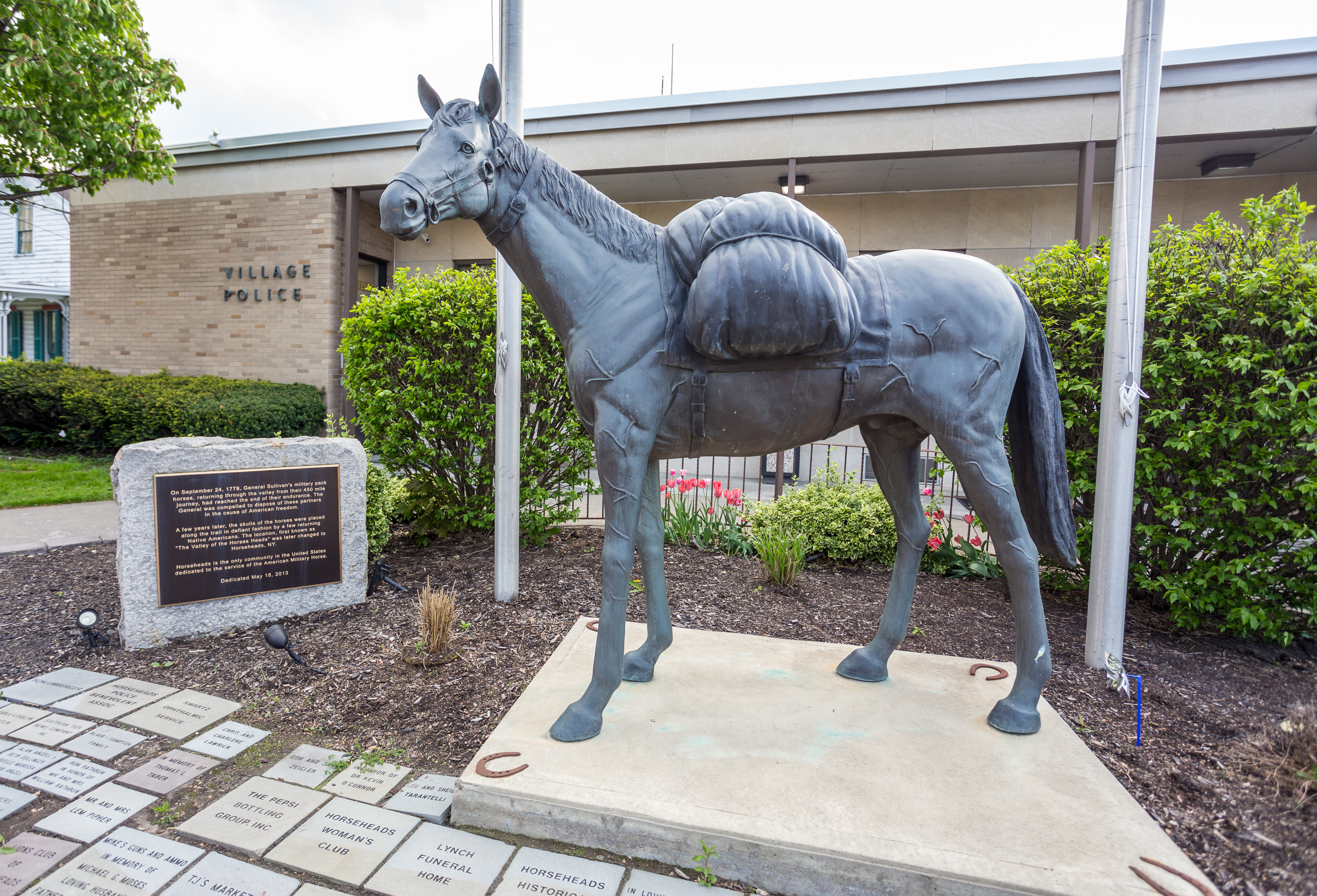
A memorial to Sullivan's pack horses in the village of Horseheads, New York

Exhausted from carrying the expedition's supplies, many of Sullivan's pack horses reached the end of their endurance on the return to Tioga. Just north of what is now Elmira, New York, Sullivan ordered most of them euthanized. A few years later, the skulls of these horses were lined along the trail as a warning to potential settlers. The area became known as "The Valley of Horses Heads" and is now known as the town and village of Horseheads.

Sullivan, with the main body of his forces, returned to the Chemung River on September 24 and waited for Dearborn and Butler to arrive. Dearborn's detachment reached Sullivan's camp two days later while Butler's did not arrive until September 28. Sullivan's army returned to Tioga on September 30. Fort Sullivan was demolished on October 3, and the following day Sullivan's army boarded the flatboats for a three-day journey down the Susquehanna to Wyoming. Two days after arriving at Wyoming, Sullivan received orders to bring his army to West Point.

Overall, 40 villages, numerous isolated houses and 160,000 bushels of corn, as well as orchards and a vast quantity of vegetables were destroyed. Including deaths from illness, only 40 men had been lost.

=== Brodhead's expedition ===
Further to the west, a concurrent expedition was undertaken by Colonel Daniel Brodhead. Brodhead, who had been given command of the Western Department in March 1779, was a strong advocate of launching an offensive against the western Seneca. Washington's strategy for the "chastisement of the savages" initially included an operation from Fort Pitt, but in April 1779, he had ordered the expedition cancelled due to supply issues. Brodhead, however, indicated that he had sufficient men and provisions to mount an attack, and on July 21, Washington gave permission for the expedition to proceed.

Brodhead departed Fort Pitt on August 11, 1779, with a contingent of 605 "rank and file" from the 8th Pennsylvania Regiment, the 9th Virginia Regiment and the Maryland Rifle Corps, as well as militia, volunteers and allied Delaware warriors. The expedition proceeded northwards up the valley of the Allegheny River into Seneca territory in what is now northwestern Pennsylvania.

Several days into the march, Brodhead's vanguard of 15 Continentals and eight Delaware encountered seven canoes with between 30 and 40 Seneca warriors heading down the Allegheny. The Seneca are reported to have beached their canoes and prepared to fight. In the ensuing skirmish five of the warriors were killed and the rest were driven off. Two Continentals and one of the Delaware suffered slight wounds. According to Seneca oral tradition, however, the "warriors" were a hunting party that had already beached their canoes when they were surprised by the Americans.

Sullivan's forces entered the abandoned settlement of Buckaloon at the mouth of Brokenstraw Creek then proceeded eight miles further up the Allegheny to Conawago which appeared to have been abandoned several months previously. The expedition then continued twenty miles upstream to Yoghroonwago, a cluster of eight hamlets. The Seneca who lived at Yoghroonwago had fled their homes as Brodhead approached leaving many of their possessions behind. Over the next three days, Brodhead's men plundered and burned 130 houses, captured horses and cattle, and destroyed 500 acres of corn.

Although there had been earlier discussion about Brodhead linking up with Sullivan at Chenussio for an attack against Fort Niagara, Brodhead turned back after razing Yoghroonwago. From the mouth of French Creek, Brodhead sent a detachment upstream to destroy the settlement of Mahusqueehikoken. Like Yoghroonwago, Mahusqueehikoken had been hastily abandoned before Broadhead's forces arrived. The expedition returned to Fort Pitt on September 14 after covering 450 miles in 35 days.

=== Tiononderoga ===
The final operation of the campaign occurred in late September. From Kanadaseaga, Sullivan sent Colonel Peter Gansevoort with 100 men to the Mohawk Valley. Gansevoort was ordered to destroy the Mohawk settlement of Tiononderoga and capture the inhabitants. Sullivan believed that Tiononderoga, located beside Fort Hunter at the mouth of Schoharie Creek, was "constantly employed in giving intelligence to the enemy." Gansevoort reached Fort Stanwix on September 25, and four days later surprised and captured the occupants of Tiononderoga's four houses. Gansevoort wrote, "It is remarked that the Indians live much better than most of the Mohawk River farmers, their houses very well furnished with all necessary household utensils, great plenty of grain, several horses, cows, and wagons".

A group of local colonists, homeless after earlier Indigenous raids, successfully petitioned Gansevoort to turn the houses over to them. Gansevoort's actions were criticized by Philip Schuyler, Commissioner for Indian Affairs and member of the Continental Congress, because the captured Mohawks were strictly neutral. The Mohawks were held prisoner at Albany until released on Washington's orders in late October.

== British reaction ==
Canadian historian Gavin Watt described the British reaction to the invasion of the Haudenosaunee homeland as "incredibly weak and ill-timed." Following France's declaration of war against Britain in June 1778, Governor Frederick Haldimand of Quebec became preoccupied with the possibility of a Franco-American invasion. As a result he focused on reinforcing the defences of the St. Lawrence River valley rather than supporting Britain's Haudenosaunee allies by establishing a long-promised post at Oswego on Lake Ontario or increasing troop strength at Fort Niagara.

By the spring of 1779 the British had become aware that the Americans were planning a major offensive although the target was unclear. Reports had reached Quebec about the construction of a large number of bateaux at Stillwater on the Hudson River which suggested an attack on Montreal. Haldimand also received information that American troops were gathering at Albany and Schenectady with the goal of establishing a military presence at Oswego.

Lord Germain, Secretary of State for the Colonies, expressed his belief that the building of bateaux at Stillwater indicated that the Americans intended to move forces up the Mohawk River to Fort Stanwix, and from there would move against Fort Niagara or Fort Detroit. Sir Henry Clinton, the commander-in-chief of British forces in America, was convinced that the Americans were planning to capture Fort Detroit and that a feint up Susquehanna River valley would be used to draw the attention of Butler's Rangers and the allied Haudenosaunee.

In May 1779, Major Butler, accompanied by five companies of Butler's Rangers and a detachment of the 8th Regiment of Foot, established a forward operating base at Kanadaseaga located near the northern end of Seneca Lake. At Kanadaseaga, Butler received reports from Indigenous scouts and American deserters of the gathering of troops and the stockpiling of supplies at Canajoharie and Wyoming. He passed on this information to the British commander of Fort Niagara, Lieutenant Colonel Mason Bolton, who forwarded it to Haldimand. Butler later reported that there was no doubt that the "rebels" were coming up the Susquehanna with the ultimate goal of attacking Fort Niagara. Haldimand, however, was skeptical about the accuracy of such reports:

It is impossible the rebels can be in such force as has been represented by the deserters to Major Butler upon the Susquehanna. He would do well to send out intelligent white men to be satisfied of the truth of those reports. If anything is really intended against the Upper Country, I am convinced that Detroit is the object and that they show themselves and spread reports of an expedition in your neighbourhood merely to divert the Rangers and Indians from their main purpose. Major Butler should be aware of this but at the same time be cautious of leaving the Indian Country exposed.

On July 20, Joseph Brant led his volunteers and a detachment of Butler's Rangers against the settlement of Minisink in the upper Delaware River valley. Ten houses, eleven barns, a church, and a gristmill were destroyed in the raid. Most of the settlers escaped to main fort but four men were killed and three were taken prisoner. Two days later, a force of 120 militiamen led by Colonel John Hathorn tried to intercept Brant's force at Minisink Ford. Before an ambush could be set, an accidental rifle discharge alerted Brant to the trap. Brant was able to gain the high ground behind Hathorn and in the ensuing battle 46 militiamen were killed. Brant reported three of his men killed and of the ten wounded, four were unlikely to survive.

On July 28, Captain John McDonell attacked Fort Freeland on the West Branch of the Susquehanna with his company of Butler's Rangers, a detachment of the 8th Regiment of Foot, and 120 Seneca led by Cornplanter. The fort's small garrison quickly surrendered, and a relief force that arrived shortly afterwards was routed. After interrogating the fort's commander, McDonell wrote to Butler that he had no doubt of the American intention to attack the "Indian Country" from Wyoming. He wrote that Sullivan and Maxwell had joined Hand at Wyoming with artillery, boats and pack horses. Butler passed this information to Quebec adding that Clinton was at Lake Otsego and would rendezvous with Sullivan at Tioga. In response, Haldimand wrote directly to Butler in August reaffirming his belief that Fort Detroit was the target and that the American forces on the Susquehanna were a feint.

In mid-August, Butler accompanied by about 300 Seneca and Cayuga warriors led by Sayenqueraghta, Cornplanter, and Fish Carrier moved south to the Chemung River where they were joined by Joseph Brant and Brant's Volunteers, as well as a number of Delaware. Butler and Brant believed that harassment raids would be more effective than making a stand, however, they were overruled by Sayenqueraghta, Cornplanter and the Delaware. Following the Battle of Newtown, Butler retreated to Kanadaseaga and then to Chenussio. After the Boyd and Parker Ambush, he withdrew further west to Buffalo Creek.

In early September, Haldimand reluctantly decided to send reinforcements. He ordered Sir John Johnson to take command of a 400-man relief expedition that would proceed from Lachine up the St Lawrence River to Carleton Island. The expedition consisted of soldiers from Johnson's King's Royal Regiment of New York (KRRNY), detachments of the 34th Foot and the 47th Foot, a company of Hessian Jägers, and Leake's Independent Company. They were joined by Mohawk, Abenaki and Wendat warriors from the Seven Nations of Canada. The expedition departed Lachine on September 13 and reached Carleton Island on September 26. At Carleton Island, Johnson learned that Sullivan was withdrawing back to Tioga. He briefly considered an attack against Fort Sullivan, but abandoned the idea in favour of an attack against the Oneida. This plan was also abandoned when it was learned that the Oneida had been forewarned. Finally, Johnson received orders to have the KRRNY, Leake's and the 34th garrison Carleton Island while the Jägers were to be sent to Niagara and the 47th to Detroit.

== Aftermath ==
Sullivan received the thanks of Congress on October 14, 1779. On November 6, 1779 he informed George Washington that he intended to resign from the Continental Army, writing "My Health is too much impair’d." Sullivan elaborated further in a letter to Congress dated November 9, 1779: "My Heal⟨th⟩ is so much impair’d by a violent bilious disorder, which seize⟨d⟩ me in the commencement, and continued during the whole of the western expedition." Congress accepted Sullivan's resignation on November 30, 1779.

On September 21, 1779, there were 5036 Indigenous refugees at Fort Niagara. This number decreased to 3,678 by October 2, and by November 21, roughly 2,600 refugees still remained at Fort Niagara. Two Seneca villages west of the Genesee River had escaped destruction and absorbed some of the refugees. A small number relocated to Carleton Island at the eastern end of Lake Ontario. Some refugees returned to their razed villages, and some moved into hunting camps. After wintering at Fort Niagara, most of the remaining Seneca and Cayuga resettled at Buffalo Creek at the eastern end of Lake Erie.

The winter of 1780 was especially hard with frequent storms and bitter cold. New York Harbour froze completely, and British soldiers were able to march across the ice from Manhattan to Staten Island. At Fort Niagara, the Haudenosaunee refugees who had taken shelter there suffered greatly. The snow fell several feet deep and the temperature remained well below freezing for many weeks. Deer and other game died in large numbers. An unknown number of refugees died from hypothermia, starvation, or disease.

Francis Goring, an employee of the trading firm Taylor & Forsyth, described the conditions at Fort Niagara in an October 1780 letter to his uncle:

I cannot help mentioning that last winter was the severest that was ever felt here. Our river was frozen over for seven weeks, so that horse and sley could pass, which was never known to be froze over before, owing to the great rapidity of the water from the falls. The snow in the woods eight feet on a level ground.

In February 1780, Philip Schuyler, a member of the Continental Congress, sent four pro-rebellion Haudenosaunee messengers to Fort Niagara. Little Abraham, a neutral Mohawk leader, told his listeners that the Continental Congress was ready to offer peace if the refugees were to return to their own country and embrace neutrality. The Seneca war chief Sayenqueraghta was indignant. Mohawk war leader Aaron Hill accused the four of being deceitful spies. Guy Johnson, the Superintendent of the British Indian Department, ordered the messengers imprisoned in Fort Niagara's "black hole," an unheated, unlit stone cell. Little Abraham died as a result of his harsh confinement.

The year 1780 coincided with the sudden appearance of a massive number of periodical cicadas (a large insect species which emerge from underground only once every seventeen years to breed) in the region of the conflicts. The sudden arrival of such a large quantity of the insects provided a source of sustenance for the Onondaga people who were experiencing severe food insecurity following the Sullivan campaigns and the subsequent brutal winter. The seemingly miraculous arrival of the cicadas (specifically, Brood VII also known as the Onondaga brood) is commemorated by the Onondaga as an intervention by the Creator to ensure their survival after such a traumatizing, catastrophic event.

294 formerly rebel Onondagas, Tuscaroras, and Oneidas arrived at Fort Niagara in early July 1780 and declared their support for the British.

The Sullivan expedition did not end Haudenosaunee participation in the Revolutionary War. Although the destruction of their villages and crops forced the Haudenosaunee to take refuge at Fort Niagara and put considerable strain on British resources, it also triggered devastating revenge attacks. John Butler reported that 59 war parties set out from Fort Niagara between February and September 1780. A raid on Harpersfield in April 1780 led by Joseph Brant killed three and took 11 prisoners. In May 1780, Haudenosaunee warriors accompanied Sir John Johnson and the King's Royal Regiment of New York in a raid that destroyed every building in Caughnawaga except for the church. In October, Johnson led a second expedition against the Schoharie and Mohawk valleys in which 200 dwellings were burned and 150,000 tons of grain destroyed. 265 Haudenosaunee warriors including Brant, Cornplanter and Sayenqueraghta participated in this expedition during which 40 patriot militia were killed at the Battle of Stone Arabia. In total, the Mohawk and Schoharie valleys saw 330 men, women and children killed or taken prisoner, six forts and several mills destroyed, and over 700 houses and barns burned in 1780.

According to Barbara Graymont, author of The Iroquois in the American Revolution, "the campaign of 1780 was an eloquent testimony to the ineffectiveness of Sullivan's expedition in quelling the Indian threat to the frontier." Military historian Joseph Fischer describes the Sullivan Expedition as a "well-executed failure." In his conclusion to his journal of the campaign, Major Jeremiah Fogg noted: "The nests are destroyed, but the birds are still on the wing."

The Haudenosaunee were ignored in the peace negotiations between the United States and Britain that led to the 1783 Treaty of Paris. Beginning in 1784, the United States negotiated a series of treaties with the Haudenosaunee that led to the cession of most of their traditional territory. In the October 1784 Treaty of Fort Stanwix, the Haudenosaunee delegates relinquished their claims to the Ohio Country, and ceded a strip of land along the east side of the Niagara River as well as all of their territory west of mouth of Buffalo Creek. The Six Nations in council at Buffalo Creek, however, refused to ratify the treaty, denying that their delegates had the authority to surrender such large tracts of land.

In October 1784, Sir Frederick Haldimand, the governor of the province of Quebec, signed a decree that granted 950,000 acres (380,000 ha) to the Haudenosaunee in compensation for their alliance with British forces during the war. This tract of land, known as the Haldimand Tract, extended for six miles (9.7 km) to each side of the Grand River, from its source to Lake Erie. In 1785, Joseph Brant led about 1,450 to the Haldimand Tract. Others, primarily Mohawk, settled with John Deseronto on the Bay of Quinte. A significant number of Seneca, Cayuga and Onondaga remained at Buffalo Creek.

In 1788, at the First Treaty of Buffalo Creek, a syndicate of land speculators led by Oliver Phelps and Nathaniel Gorham purchased from the Seneca their territory between the Genessee River and Seneca Lake. The following year the Cayuga ceded to New York most of their traditional territory except for roughly 64,000 acres at the north end of Cayuga Lake. The November 1794 Treaty of Canandaigua established perpetual “peace and friendship” between the Haudenosaunee and the United States, and acknowledged the sovereignty of the Haudenosaunee within their lands. The 1797 Treaty of Big Tree saw the Seneca relinquish their rights to most of their remaining territory west of the Genesee River. 12 parcels of land were reserved for the Seneca including tracts at Buffalo Creek, Tonawanda, Allegany, and Cattaraugus.

Ordering the "particulars of the expedition" would cement George Washington's identity among the Haudenosaunee as Hanödaga꞉nyas (Town Destroyer). In 1790, Cornplanter told Washington, "When your army entered the Country of the Six Nations, we called you the Town-destroyer and to this day, when that name is heard, our women look behind them and turn pale, and our children cling close to the neck of their mothers." The name had been given to Washington decades earlier during the French and Indian War, while Washington's great-grandfather John Washington had been given a similar appellation by the Susquehannock in 1675.

== Genocide controversy ==
A number of scholars have labelled the Sullivan Expedition as a genocide, arguing that Washington clearly intended to "extirpate" the Haudenosaunee. Still others, while acknowledging that aspects of the campaign were genocidal, prefer to use phrases like "ethnic cleansing."

In Surviving Genocide, Jeffrey Ostler writes that historians "are more inclined than they once were to gesture to particular actions, events, impulses, and effects as genocidal, but genocide has not become a key concept in scholarship." He notes that while some scholars have argued that Washington was well aware that the campaign would cause more than just dispossession, others have questioned whether Washington had genocidal intent since he ordered Sullivan to "capture as many prisoners of every age and sex possible."

In George Washington's War on Native Americans, Barbara Alice Mann asserts that the Revolutionary War resulted in "thousands and thousands of desperate and starving refugees fleeing the Continental Army and its ruthless militias." Mann states as unquestionable fact that Washington ordered attacks against the Haudenosaunee so as to "seize those lands under the cover of a war of liberation." According to Mann "land, not reciprocation" motivated the campaign. Mann diminishes or denies Haudenosaunee culpability at the Battle of Oriskany, the Battle of Wyoming and the Cherry Valley Massacre, and stresses that Washington and his subordinates "visited a holocaust upon the Indians."

Mann's work has been criticized. Joseph Fischer wrote that George Washington's War on Native Americans "lacks balance and is insufficiently researched," and argued that her portrayal of the Sullivan campaign was seriously flawed. David Dixon wrote that Mann's book "lacks objectivity and is, at times, punctuated by flawed interpretations and outright distortions." Frank Cogliano called it "polemic rhetoric that renders it wholly inadequate as a history of this important subject," and notes Mann's failure to cite seminal work on the topic, including Colin Calloway's The American Revolution in Indian Country: Crisis and diversity in Native American Communities and Max Mintz's Seeds of Empire.

In her 2018 article, "Hostile Nations: Quantifying the Destruction of the Sullivan-Clinton Genocide of 1779," Historian Rhiannon Koehler asserts that the campaign was an "effort to wipe out the Haudenosaunee as an entity and claim their lands." She dismisses the idea that Washington was acting in response to Indigenous raids, and insists that the orders Sullivan received were a clear indication of Washington's genocidal intent to "destroy the Haudenosaunee as an ethnic group."

== Indigenous casualties ==
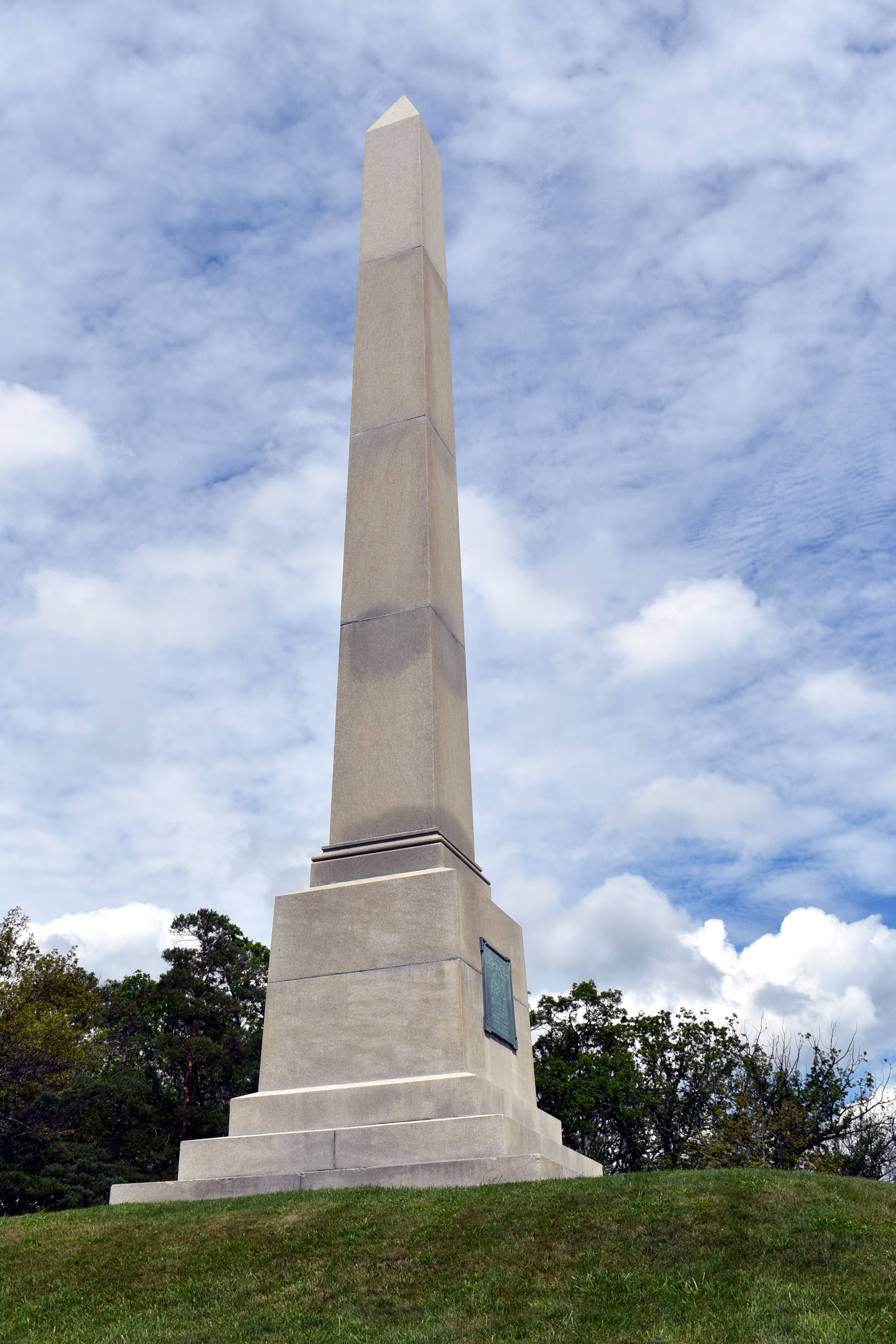
Monument constructed in 1912 and located in Newtown Battlefield State Park

The Haudenosaunee suffered a decrease in their population as a consequence of the Sullivan campaign. The magnitude of the decrease, however, has been the subject of considerable debate. Jeffrey Ostler estimates that the number killed by direct military action was around 200 (including some women and children), with as many as 1,000 later dying in refugee camps from starvation or disease. He observes that the death toll would have been higher had the Seneca and Cayuga chosen to defend their towns rather than evacuate them. The Seneca war chief Sayenqueraghta later explained, “we lost our Country it is true, but this was to secure our Women & Children.”

In The American Revolution in Indian Country, Colin Calloway of Dartmouth University describes in detail the conditions at Fort Niagara following the Sullivan campaign. He estimated that "several hundred" succumbed that winter despite the best efforts of the British to supply clothing, blankets, provisions and medical care. Alan Taylor in The Divided Ground also reports "several hundred" deaths as does Rachel Herrmann of Cardiff University who uniquely describes the Sullivan campaign as "victual warfare."

Koehler, on the other hand, wrote that "mass death was a reality of the campaign." She suggests that the overall death toll may have been a high as 55.5 percent or roughly 5,000 individuals, a figure based on the assumption that the 5,036 refugees at Fort Niagara in September 1779 represented every surviving Iroquois individual, and that at least 20 percent of the refugees died during the winter. Koehler further states that between 473 and 580 men, women and children died from direct military action.

== Commemoration ==
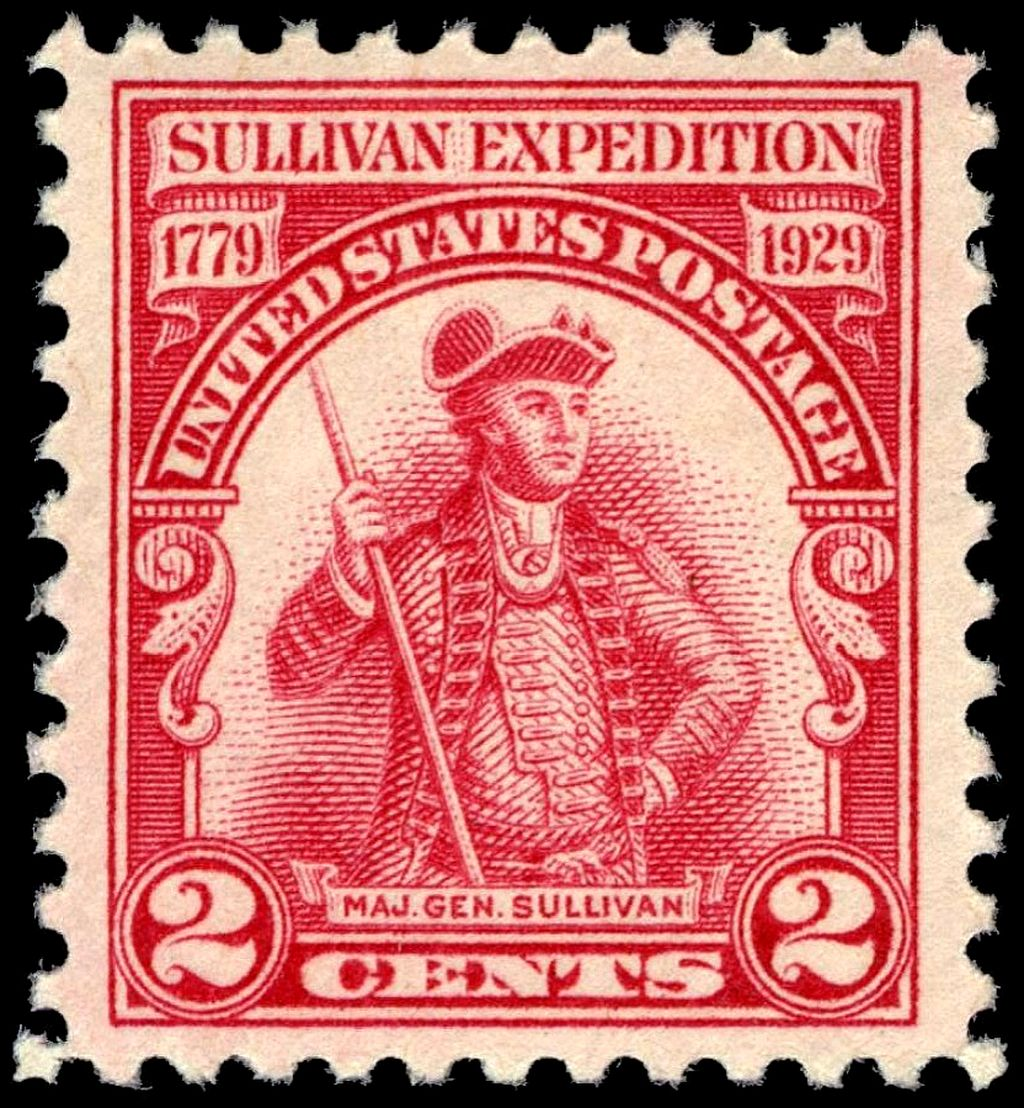
In 1929, on the 150th anniversary of the Sullivan Expedition, the U.S. Post Office issued a postage stamp commemorating the event.

To celebrate the centennial of the Sullivan expedition, a monument was erected in what is now Newtown Battlefield State Park in 1879. One of the speakers at the dedication ceremony was General William Tecumseh Sherman, famous for his March to the Sea during the American Civil War. In his speech, Sherman justified Sullivan's "scorched earth" campaign and the displacement of Indigenous people by appealing to the widespread American 19th-century belief in manifest destiny. He told his audience, "Wherever men raise up their hands to oppose this great advancing tide of civilization, they must be swept aside, peaceably if possible, forcibly if we must. The monument collapsed during a storm in 1911 and was replaced with the current monument the following year.

To celebrate the 150th anniversary of the Sullivan expedition in 1929, New York's state historian, Alexander Flick, successfully lobbied for the erection of thirty-five "Route of the Armies" monuments that marked the movements of Sullivan's and Clinton's forces in New York and Pennsylvania. The brass plaque mounted on each of the monoliths bears an inscription that perpetuates the false narrative that Sullivan "did conquer the Indians and forever stopped their depredations." The inscription states that Sullivan and Clinton led "an expedition against the hostile Indian nations which checked the aggression of the English and Indians on the frontiers of New York and Pennsylvania, extending westward the dominion of the United States." Similar markers were erected in Pennsylvania marking Sullivan's route from Easton to Tioga. A number of other monuments were erected by various local organizations while a plethora of cast-iron roadside markers were placed by the New York State Education Department.

A major highlight of New York's sesquicentennial celebrations were the three large pageants held at Elmira, Genesee and Canajoharie. Frick sought Haudenosaunee involvement in the pageants and in the dozens of decidation ceremonies held across the state but was largely rebuked. That same year, the United States Post Office issued a commemorative two-cent red stamp featuring a portrait of Major General Sullivan.

Celebrations of the bicentennial of the Sullivan expedition in 1979 were far more subdued. The overall lack of interest may have been the result of a growing unwillingness to celebrate military victories against Indigenous peoples. The most significant event was the reenactment of the Battle of Newtown staged at Newtown Battlefield State Park. For the 225th anniversary, a much larger reenactment was staged. In recent years, reenactments have included the participation of both Indigenous and Canadian reenactors.

== See also ==
- American Revolutionary War § Stalemate in the North. Places the Sullivan Expedition in overall sequence and strategic context.
