= Matthias Ogden =

American soldier and politician (1754–1791)

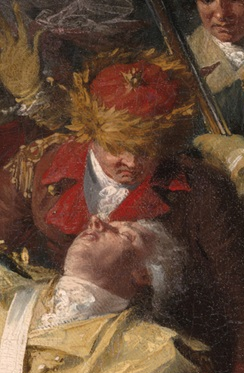
- Detail from a painting by John Trumbull depicting Ogden (in red uniform) and Gen. Richard Montgomery
- Born: October 22, 1754
- Died: March 31, 1791 (aged 36); Elizabethtown, New Jersey
- Military career
- Allegiance: United States
- Branch: Continental Army
- Service years: 1775–1780
- Rank: Colonel
- Unit: 1st New Jersey Regiment
- Conflicts: American Revolutionary War: Battle of Quebec; Battle of Monmouth

Matthias Ogden (October 22, 1754 – March 31, 1791) was an American soldier and politician. He fought in the American Revolutionary War, and served in various political positions afterwards.

== Family ==
Matthias Ogden was a son of Robert Ogden, a lawyer and public official, and Phebe (Hatfield) Ogden. Robert was politically prominent, serving as the speaker of the New Jersey Assembly on the eve of the American Revolution. The family had deep roots in New Jersey: John Ogden had built a house in Elizabeth in 1664 after having moved from Long Island, where he had settled in 1640 from Hampshire, England. Matthias attended the College of New Jersey (now Princeton University) as did his younger brother, Aaron Ogden. His sister Rhoda was married to Aaron Burr's uncle, Timothy Edwards. Burr and Matthias grew up together in the Edwards household and attended Princeton together.

== Revolutionary war ==
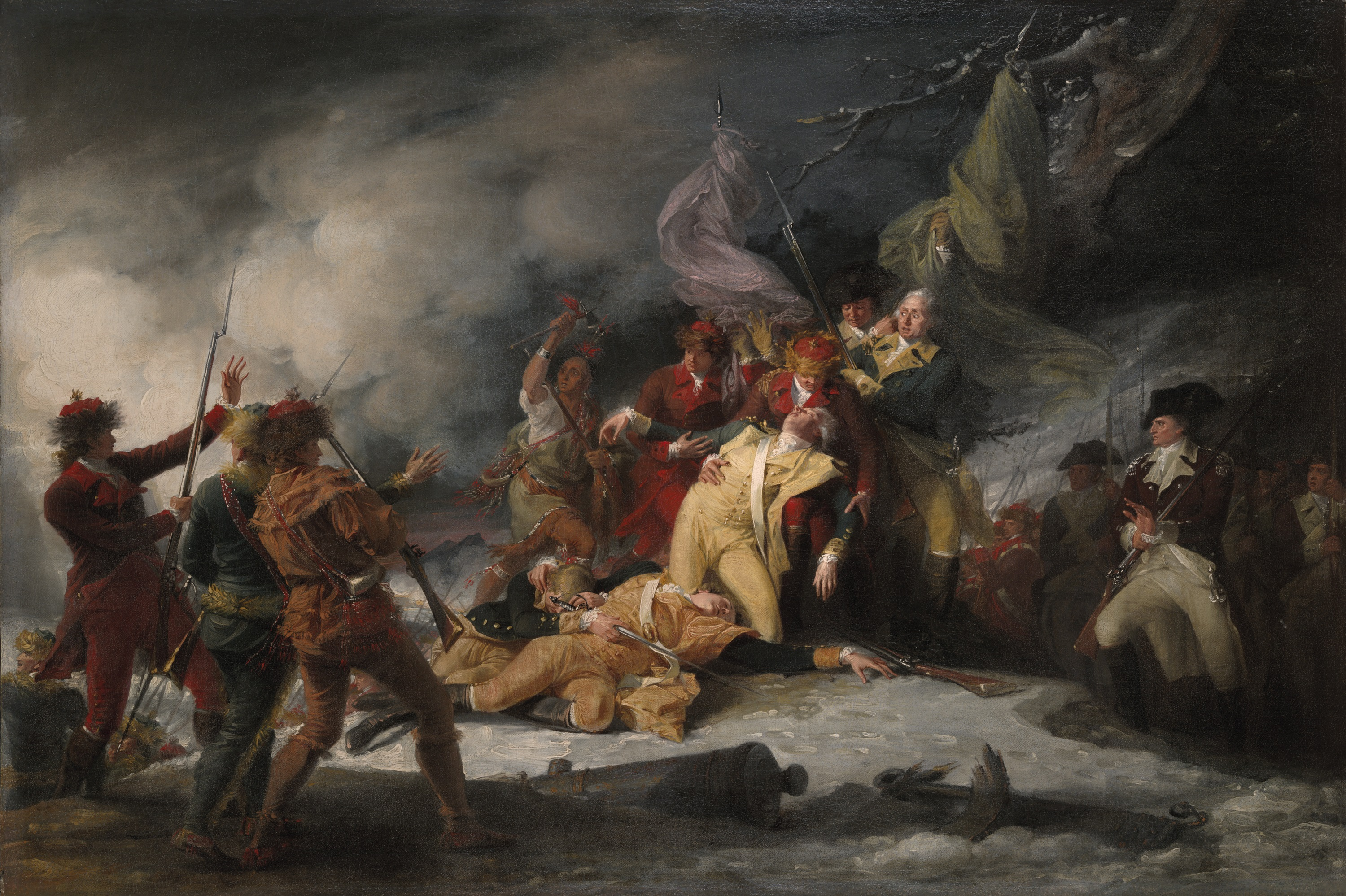
The Death of General Montgomery in the Attack on Quebec, December 31, 1775 by John Trumbull (1786)

After the outbreak of hostilities between the American colonists and the British authorities in 1775, Ogden went along as a gentleman-volunteer on Benedict Arnold's march to Quebec, joined by his cousin Aaron Burr. Ogden participated in the assault on that city, and was wounded in the Battle of Quebec on December 31, 1775. In a 1786 painting of the Battle of Quebec, John Trumbull inaccurately depicted Ogden in place of Burr, holding General Richard Montgomery as he died. Due to his own injuries, Ogden was not actually present at Montgomery's death, according to Ogden's journal of the expedition.

Ogden was named lieutenant colonel of the First New Jersey Battalion in March 1776, serving under Colonel William Winds. At the age of 22, he became colonel of the newly reorganized 1st New Jersey Regiment on January 1, 1777, after Silas Newcomb resigned the position. In 1779, he was a defendant in a court martial in which Isaac Morrison testified.

Ogden was captured by the British at Elizabethtown, New Jersey, in November 1780. He was released in a prisoner exchange.

In September 1781, Ogden conceived a plan to capture Prince William Henry (later King William IV). The plan received Washington's approval, and was to be effected in March 1782, but had to be abandoned.

Ogden was granted military leave by Congress in April 1783 to visit Europe, in order to secure business relations with the French. While there, he was awarded the honor le droit du tabouret by King Louis XVI. Ogden brought back news of the 1783 Treaty of Paris upon his return to America.

He was brevetted to the rank of brigadier general by Congress in September 1783, and was described by one historian as a "brave and gallant soldier".

Ogden's leadership role was featured prominently by historian William M. Fowler in An American Crisis: George Washington and the Dangerous Two Years after Yorktown, 1781–1783.

== Postwar ==
After the war, Ogden was a founding member of The Society of the Cincinnati in the state of New Jersey, and a member of the state's legislative council (1785). He was one of the agents entrusted with the minting of new state coinage for New Jersey, the "Jersey horsehead" pennies. The coins, which depicted a horse's head and plow, symbols taken from the coat of arms/Seal of New Jersey, on one side, and a "Union" shield taken from the Great Seal of the United States, on the reverse, were produced in a number of locations. Ogden operated his mint in Elizabethtown. In the 1789 presidential election, Ogden was an elector for New Jersey.

Ogden was married to Hannah Dayton, a daughter of Elias Dayton. They had a son, Francis Barber Ogden (1783–1857), who was named after fellow Jersey Continental officer and in-law, Francis Barber, who was married to Matthias' sister, Mary.

Ogden died of yellow fever in Elizabethtown on March 31, 1791, at the age of 36.

== Sources ==
- Malone, Dumas, editor. Dictionary of American Biography.
- Wheeler, William Ogden. The Ogden Family in America.
- Virtual American Biographies: Robert Ogden
