= Fish Carrier (Ojageght) =

18th-century chief of the Cayuga people

Fish Carrier or "Ojageght," which translates to English as "he is carrying a fish by the forehead strap," was a Haudenosaunee chief of the Cayuga people. He supported the British during the American Revolution, participating in the Battle of Wyoming in 1778 and the Battle of Newtown in 1779.

== American Revolutionary War ==
Although the Encyclopedia of Native American Biography states that Fish Carrier “supported the patriot cause,” historians Barbara Graymont and Max Mintz both record that Fish Carrier was allied with the British, and led the Cayuga contingent against the Americans at the Battle of Wyoming and the Battle of Newtown. At a council held at Irondequoit in July 1777, the Cayuga and Seneca had abandoned their neutrality and had "taken up the hatchet" against the Americans. Fish Carrier accepted the war belt on behalf of the Cayuga, and likely participated in the Siege of Fort Stanwix and the Battle of Oriskany later that summer.

While a small group of Oneida led by Han Yost Thahoswagwat supported the Americans during the Sullivan Expedition, this was not the case for the Cayuga whose villages were destroyed in September 1779. The Cayuga fled to Fort Niagara and the following spring moved to Buffalo Creek.

Fish Carrier participated in a number of raids in 1780 including the August 1780 raid on the Canajoharie district led by Joseph Brant. Fifty-three houses were burned as well as barns, a gristmill, a church, and two small forts.

== Postwar ==
Most of the Cayuga, including Fish Carrier, remained at Buffalo Creek after the war, while a few hundred settled on the Grand River on land granted to the Haudenosaunee in 1784 by Frederick Haldimand, Governor of the Province of Quebec. A faction of the Cayuga led by Steel Trap, however, returned to the Cayuga Lake region and in February 1789 negotiated a treaty with Governor George Clinton of New York. Steel Trap ceded most of the Cayuga's traditional territory except for roughly 64,000 acres at the north end of Cayuga Lake. Although Fish Carrier did not attend the negotiations or sign the treaty, one square mile was reserved for his use. In June 1790, Fish Carrier met with Governor Clinton at Fort Stanwix and ratified the 1789 Treaty.

Fish Carrier attended meetings between Indian Commissioner Timothy Pickering and representatives of the Haudenosaunee at Tioga Point in November 1790 and at Painted Post (Newtown) in July 1791. He was an advisor to Red Jacket during the meeting at Buffalo in April 1791 with Colonel Thomas Proctor.

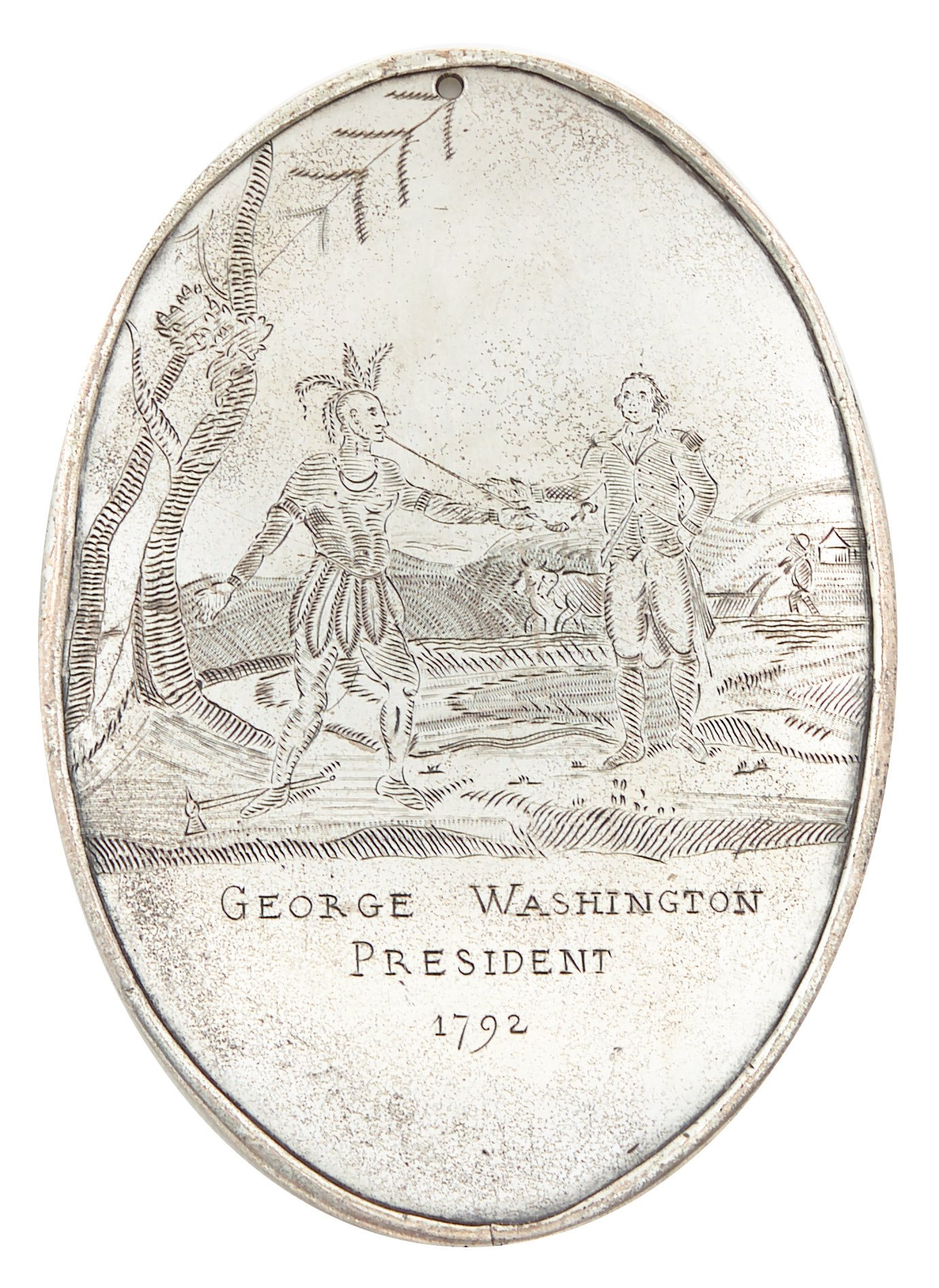
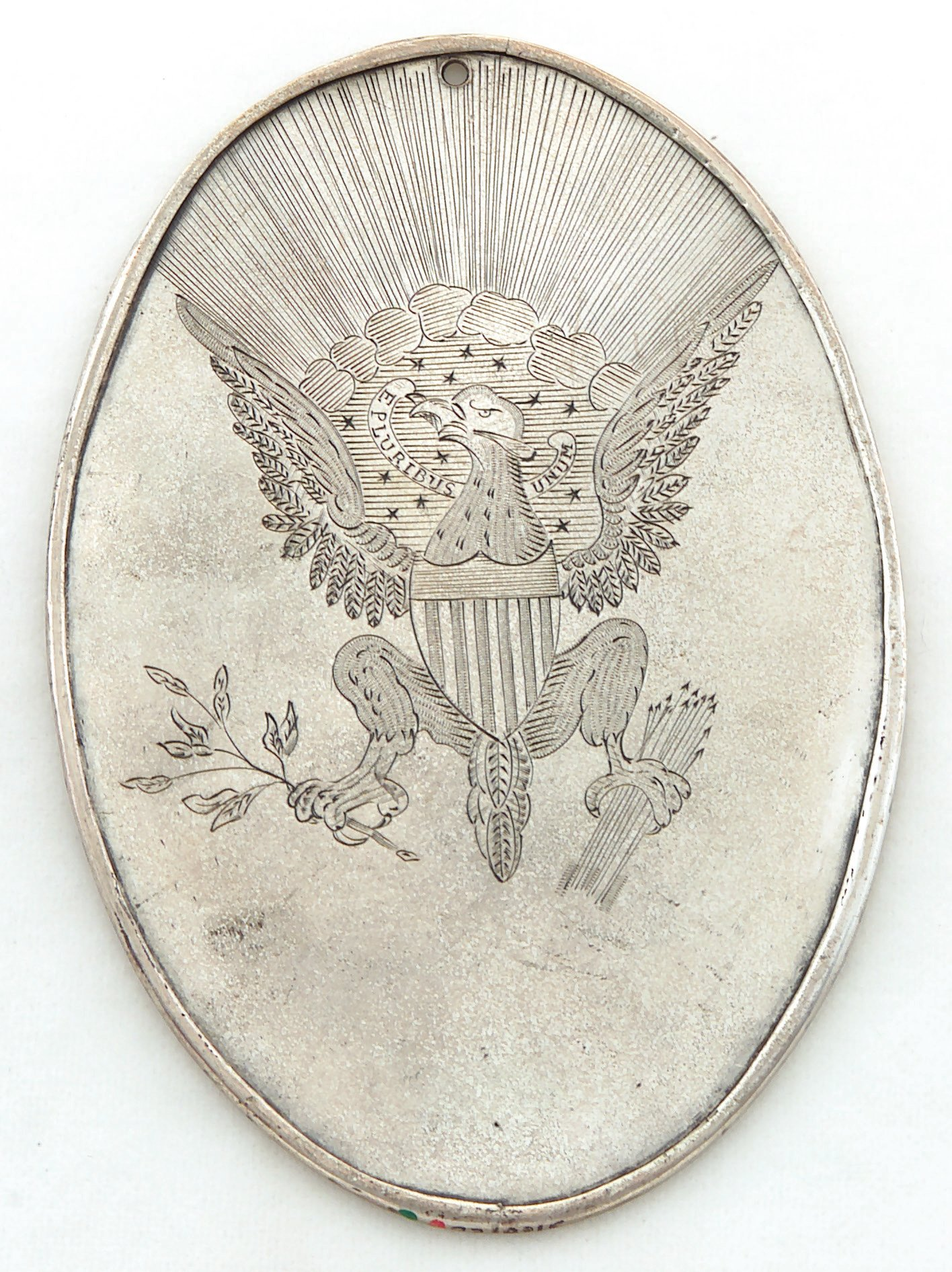
Indian Peace Medal, 1792

In March 1792, Fish Carrier was with a delegation of Seneca and Cayuga that met with George Washington in Philadelphia. Fish Carrier, Red Jacket, Cornplanter, Blacksnake and two others were presented with large oval silver peace medals.

Fish Carrier was one of the signatories of the November 1794 Treaty of Canandaigua that established perpetual “peace and friendship” between the Haudenosaunee and the United States, and acknowledged the sovereignty of the Haudenosaunee within their lands.

Fish Carrier worked to reduce tensions between the Senecas and the Onedias who had supported British and American forces respectively. Julia Anna Perkins, in Early Times on the Susquehanna, writes about Fish Carrier at a ceremony to adopt Robert Morris into the Senecas following Morris's acquisition of much of the earlier Phelps and Gorham Purchase. The ceremony became tense following dances and songs of battles between the Senecas and the Oneidas, and knives were drawn. Fish Carrier stood up, "striking the post with violence", and shouted "You are all a parcel of boys; when you have all attained my age, and performed the warlike deeds that I have performed, you may boast what you have done; not till then!"

== Name ==
Fish Carrier’s name in Cayuga is transcribed as “Oo-jau-gent-a” on the Treaty of Canandaigua, as “Ogageghte” on a document dated August 1789. as “Ho-ja-ga-ta” by ethnologist Lewis H. Morgan. and as "Ojageght" in the Handbook of American Indians North of Mexico.

== Family ==
Fish Carrier had three children, a daughter and two sons. After Fish Carrier's death at Buffalo Creek, his family moved to the Six Nations of the Grand River reserve in Upper Canada (Ontario). Morgan visited the reserve in 1850 and purchased a conch shell breastplate that had belonged to Fish Carrier for five dollars from Peter Fish Carrier, Fish Carrier's son.
