= Sayenqueraghta =

War chief of the eastern Seneca nation

Sayenqueraghta (Seneca: Kaieñˀkwaahtoñ; c. 1707 – 1786) was the war chief of the eastern Seneca nation in the mid-18th century. He was born the son of Cayenquaraghta, a prominent Seneca chief of the Turtle Clan in western New York. He lived most of his life at Kanadaseaga, near the present day town of Geneva, New York. He obtained his rank of war chief in 1751. Before the American Revolution he was referred to as chief of the Senecas.

He served on the British side against the French during the French and Indian War and was present at the Battle of Fort Niagara.

During Pontiac's War he was the Seneca war-chief who defeated a British force at the Battle of Devil's Hole. In 1764 the Seneca came to Fort Niagara where they made peace with the British government and Sayenqueraghta "buried the Axe" with Britain.

In 1765 he received Samuel Kirkland, Sir William Johnson's envoy, and at that time extended protection to Kirkland by adopting him into his family.

Also in 1765, he along with Handsome Lake and about one hundred other Seneca warriors went on an expedition against the Cherokee and Choctaw. This expedition was remembered nearly a century later for the loot of scalps and other trophies obtained.

== Names ==
Sayenqueraghta's name in the Seneca language, meaning "Disappearing Smoke" (*-yë’kwar-, "smoke"), is phonetically rendered as Kaieñˀkwaahtoñ and was spelled in a variety of ways, including Gayahgwaahdoh and Kayenquaraghton. In historical records he is most often known as Sayenqueraghta (or Sayengaraghta), which was his name in the Mohawk language, or by nicknames such as Old Smoke or the Seneca King. It is also said that he was called Old Smoke because he held the official position as the "smoke-bearer".

== American Revolution ==
Early in the Revolutionary War, Sayenqueraghta tried to keep the Haudenosaunee neutral. He attempted in June, 1777 to retrieve Seneca warriors who had joined the Loyalist officer Butler at Fort Niagara. In July, 1777, the Seneca decided to enter the war on the British side and he was named, along with Cornplanter, to be the war chiefs of the Haudenosaunee Confederacy.

He was one of the organizers of the ambush at the Battle of Oriskany, where his son was killed. He was the primary Indigenous leader at the Battle of Wyoming. His village of Ganundasaga was destroyed during the Sullivan Campaign and was not rebuilt. Sometime before 1781 he and his family relocated to Buffalo Creek, near Fort Niagara. In 1779, he started receiving a pension from the British of one hundred dollars per year. He resented the favourable treatment the British gave to Joseph Brant. Sayenqueraghta was at the Battle of Johnstown and other battles. In 1781, he led a war party towards Fort Pitt.

He was described by General Frederick Haldimand as "by many degrees the most leading and the man of most consequence and influence in the Six Nations". In 1783, a British officer said "He is a sensible old man and has been a very good warrior in his day, but like the rest is very much addicted to liquor".

He died in 1786 in Smoke Creek, Lackawanna, New York.

== Legacy ==
- Smoke Creek, New York is named after him.
