= 1st New Jersey Regiment =

- Portrait of a regimental drummer
- Active: 1744–1783
- Country: New Jersey; United States
- Branch: New Jersey Provincial Forces; Continental Army
- Type: Regiment
- Role: Infantry
- Part of: New Jersey Line
- Nickname: Jersey Blues
- Engagements: Battle of Valcour Island; Battle of Brandywine; Battle of Germantown; Battle of Monmouth; Sullivan Expedition; Battle of Springfield; Battle of Yorktown

Commanders
- Notable commanders: Col. William Alexander (1775–1776); Col. William Winds (1776–1777); Col. Silas Newcomb (1777); Col. Matthias Ogden (1777–1783)

The 1st New Jersey Regiment was the first organized militia regiment in New Jersey, formed in 1673 in Piscataway "to repel foreign Indians who come down from upper Pennsylvania and western New York (in the summer) to our shores and fill (themselves) with fishes and clams and on the way back make a general nuisance of themselves by burning hay stacks, corn fodder and even barns." The first commander and founder of the regiment was Captain Francis Drake (1615-1687) who served from 1673 to 1685. All of New Jersey's regular organized military forces trace their lineage to this first provincial militia unit.

The regiment's allegiance was to the British Crown until 1775, when the regiment was raised for service in the Continental Army during the American Revolutionary War.

== "Jersey Blues" ==
Although the unit had existed long beforehand, it was not until the mid-eighteenth century that the term "Jersey Blues" came into popular usage. The term "Jersey Blues" derives from the uniform adopted by the New Jersey provincial legislature for its troops, which were assigned to service under the New Jersey Provincial Forces. The coats of these Jersey units were blue with red lapels and cuffs. The men also wore blue breeches or leggings and red waistcoats. (In some cases, sturdier buckskin or leather breeches were authorized.) The term "Jersey Blues" continued to be used well into the early nineteenth century in reference to the state's military units. The regiments of the Jersey Line during the American Revolution and those of the New Jersey Volunteers, raised for Federal service during the Civil War, adopted the term. It was actually even used by New Jersey's National Guard unit after WWII – 50th Armored Division; as well as in 2008 when the N. J. Guard was sent to Iraq during Operation Iraqi Freedom – 50th Infantry Brigade Combat Team.

== Service to the crown ==
=== King George's War ===
In 1744, during King George's War (1744–1748) the New Jersey legislature appropriated money and raised 500 volunteers to assist New York in capturing the French fort at Crown Point. Bad food, ill discipline and a mutiny resulted in the abandonment of the expedition, however.

=== French and Indian War ===
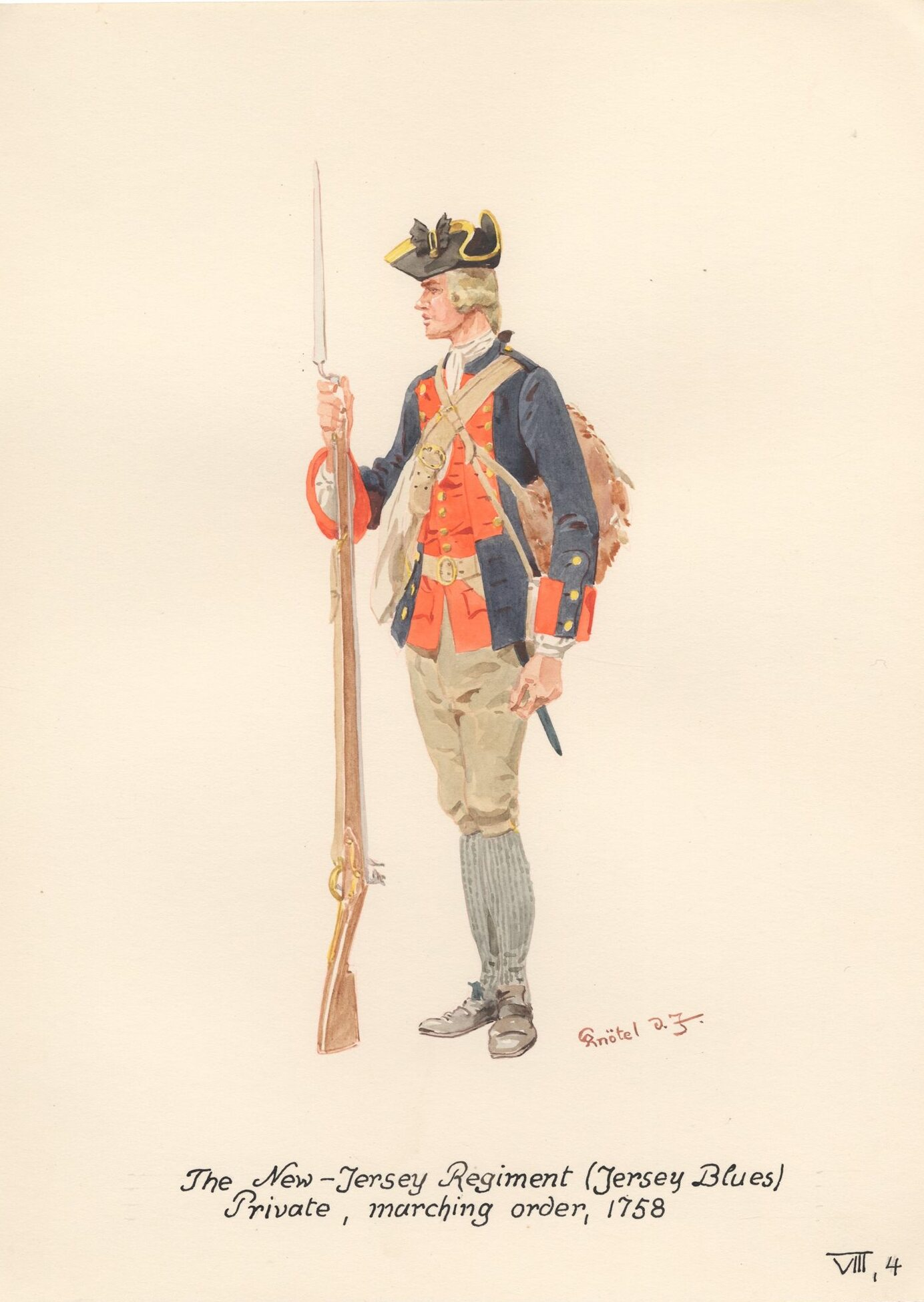
A New Jersey Regiment private in marching order in 1758

During the French and Indian War (1755–1763) New Jersey's participation was remarkable, and "Colonial Tribulations" (2007) documents the service of the New Jersey Regiment (the "Jersey Blues") throughout that period. Just as in the previous colonial wars their existence began with the New Jersey Assembly ordering the muster of 500 men to respond to the larger war looming on the New York frontier. Indian raids by tribes allied with the French along the colony's northwest border in the summer of 1755 also prompted the raising of a different unit known as the New Jersey Frontier Guard (not to be confused with the regular provincial or "Blues" regiment). The Frontier Guard responded to localized Indian incursions, as well as garrisoned the forts along the Delaware River.

Contrastingly, in 1755 the entire contingent of 500 men known as the Jersey Blues was stationed at the lightly fortified trading village of Oswego, New York, where they constructed the first documented military hospital. They also assisted with improving the fortifications in order to support the British offensive against French Fort Niagara which was being delayed until 1756. During the following year, only a part of the regiment had returned to the 'three' forts on Lake Ontario, and they were engaged in and bore the suffering of several skirmishes. However, in August the attack on their outpost by French commander the Marquis de Montcalm resulted in many Jerseymen becoming prisoners of war who experienced many documented tribulations. At least one NJ Indian is documented among the ranks.

By 1757, the Jersey Blues were re-mustered and assigned to Fort William Henry where they comprised one-third of its garrison. In July about 150 were taken as POWs while another 50 died during the Battle of Sabbath Day Point on the northern part of Lake George. The 100 men who escaped that day returned to William Henry to join the 200 others who remained in garrison. A short few weeks later those 300 were again attacked by Montcalm which was immortalized in the book and movie "The Last of the Mohicans". Most in the general public have no idea that the Jersey troops were present or what they experienced. Importantly, the unit continued to include several Native Americans from the province who experienced harsh consequences following the fort's capitulation.

In 1758, the unit was again re-mustered and engaged in the attack of French Fort Carillon, where Montcalm was able to repel a massive British force. Several Jersey Blues were killed in action. A part of the unit was later engaged in the successful taking of the strategic French outpost, Fort Frontenac, on Lake Ontario.

By 1759, they were again on the New York frontier, when a small party was ambushed by Indians allied with the French near Lake George of July 2, 1759. "16 of the Jersey Blues were sent without the camp to gather a little brush for the General's Baker, but were not an hour gone before they were surprised in sight of the camp by a party of the enemy, consisting of about 240, who killed and scalped six, wounded two, took four prisoners, and only four of the whole party escaped. They shewed themselves plainly to the whole Army after they got the scalps, gave a hollow, and then made off to their Battoes, which were not more than two miles from the Head of the Lake. A large party was ordered out after them, but in vain. They butchered our people in a most shocking manner, by cutting pieces of flesh out of their necks, thighs and legs" – New York Mercury

The New Jersey Historical Society stated that in 1760 the regiment was part of the final campaign against the French in Canada. Remarkably, one of the soldiers (a New Jersey Native American) who was taken as a POW at Fort William Henry in 1757 was reunited with the unit and returned home with them.

By 1761, existing payroll accounts verify that the unit was indeed mustered, and by 1762 they had formed a part of the expedition against Havana, Cuba. There is also oral tradition that one of the cannons at the Old Barracks in Trenton, New Jersey was a spoil of war for the Jersey Blues. Payroll accounts also verify that the unit remained activated through 1765. The Old Barracks Museum put forth a nice exhibit about the French and Indian which includes rare artifacts of the Blues.

== The American Revolution ==
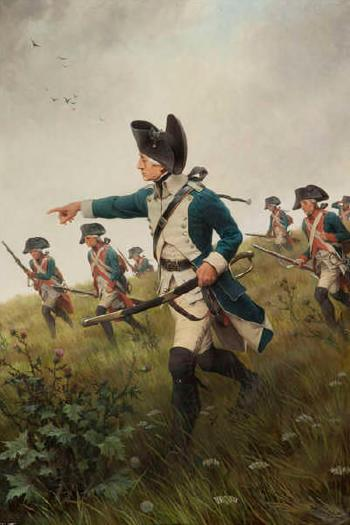
Jersey Blues as scouts, American Revolutionary War 1783s by Théophile Lybaert

The 1st New Jersey Regiment, which was known as part of the famed "Jersey Blues", was authorized on October 9, 1775, by the Continental Congress to be raised for service with the Continental Army under the command of Colonel William Alexander, better known as Lord Stirling for his (unsuccessful) claims to that Scottish title. It was also known as "First or Eastern Battalion of Foot of New Jersey Troops" while the Second New Jersey, authorized at the same time, was raised in the western counties of provincial New Jersey. Eight companies of the 1st New Jersey were raised in Essex, Middlesex, Morris, Somerset, Monmouth, and Bergen counties. One of the first activities of the newly formed unit was subduing and capturing Tories on Long Island. After Stirling was elevated to the rank of general, command of the 1st New Jersey was given to Colonel William Winds. Winds suffered humiliation after pressing for the regiment to leave Fort Ticonderoga in November 1776 after enlistments for the Jerseymen expired.

When the regiment was reorganized in January 1777 as the 1st New Jersey Regiment, Continental Line, command was first offered to Silas Newcomb, but he declined. Matthias Ogden, who had previously served as major and lieutenant colonel of the 1st NJ Battalion of 1775–1776, became regimental commander with the rank of colonel, a position he held virtually until the end of the war.

The regiment saw action at the Battle of Valcour Island, Battle of Brandywine, Battle of Germantown, Battle of Monmouth, Sullivan Expedition, Battle of Springfield and the Battle of Yorktown. Other service included Winter Cantonment at Valley Forge (1776–1777), Battle of Short Hills (1777), Winter Cantonments at Morristown/Pompton Plains. The regiment was disbanded on November 3, 1783, at New Windsor, New York.

== Famous members ==
- Elias Dayton (1737–1807), a merchant from Elizabeth and father of U.S. Constitution signer Jonathan Dayton, became a lieutenant in the Jersey Blues in 1756. He was later present at the signing of the peace treaty with the Odawa leader Pontiac outside Detroit, Michigan, in 1764 during Pontiac's Rebellion. In 1776, Dayton was appointed colonel of the Third New Jersey Regiment of Foot, also known as the Third Battalion, New Jersey Line, in the Continental Army.
- Peter Schuyler (1707–1762), who led troops in King George's War and the French and Indian War.
- Abraham Godwin (1763–1835), a brigadier general in the War of 1812.
- Abraham Godwin Jr (1791–1849), a lieutenant in the War of 1812, later a brigadier general.

Other figures associated with the Jersey Blues during the colonial period include: Col. John Parker resumed command during Schuyler's captivity – 1757. He was followed by John Johnston, another commander of the New Jersey Regiment during the French and Indian War; William "Scotch Willie" Maxwell, who was a lieutenant in the New Jersey Regiment during the colonial wars, a commissary in the 1760s, and later served as first colonel of the 2nd New Jersey Regiment (Continental Line) and general commanding the New Jersey Line during the Revolutionary War.

== See also ==
- 1st New Jersey Volunteer Infantry - Civil War unit
- 113th Infantry Regiment (United States) claims descent from the 1st New Jersey Regiment

== Bibliography ==
- Bill, Alfred. New Jersey and the Revolutionary War (Rutgers University Press, 1970) online
- Mitnick, Barbara J., ed. New Jersey in the American Revolution (Rutgers University Press, 2005) online
