= Kanadaseaga =

Town of the Seneca nation, Haudenosaunee Confederacy

Coordinates: 42°53′N 77°6′W

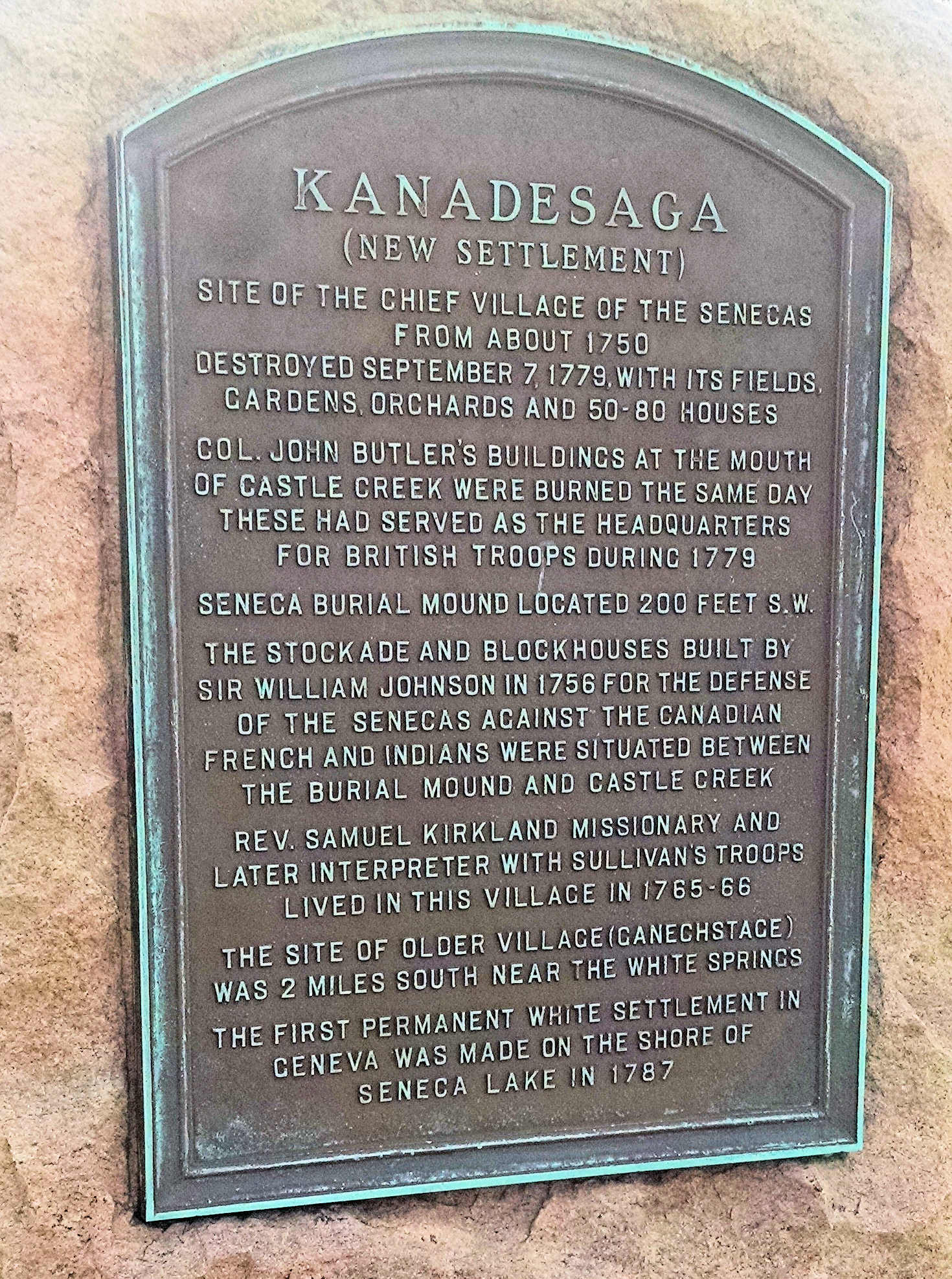
A marker near Geneva, New York

Kanadaseaga, (Note: known by many other names, including Kanadesaga, Kanatasaka, Kanadasaga, Canasadego, Ganûndase?'ge?, Seneca Castle, or Canadasaga) known in Seneca as Ganöndase:ʼgeh, was a major town, perhaps a capital, of the Seneca nation of the Haudenosaunee Confederacy in west-central New York State, United States. It was located between the northern ends of Seneca and Canandaigua lakes, one and a half miles northwest of the present-day city of Geneva in the township of Seneca. The town was situated on both sides of Kanadaseaga Creek. The Seneca established this town at least as early as 1687. It was likely established by the former residents of Ganondagan after its destruction by the French.

Around 1754, the Senecas moved north from the nearby New Ganechstage village (and prior to that, the White Springs village) to a settlement that would become known as Kanadesaga.

A blockhouse was built here in 1756 by Sir William Johnson, the remains of which were in existence in 1779. During the Revolutionary War, the British added defensive fortifications against the Americans. The town contained about sixty well-built houses.

Long known for being one of the most powerful Haudenosaunee towns, it was destroyed on September 9, 1779 by the Continental Army during the Sullivan Expedition. American forces were seeking to punish the Haudenosaunee for their raids and attacks on frontier settlements, especially in the Mohawk, Cherry and Schoharie valleys.
