= Wyoming Valley =

Coordinates: 41.251°N 75.906°W

- Metropolitan Statistical Area
- Scranton–Wilkes-Barre, PA MSA
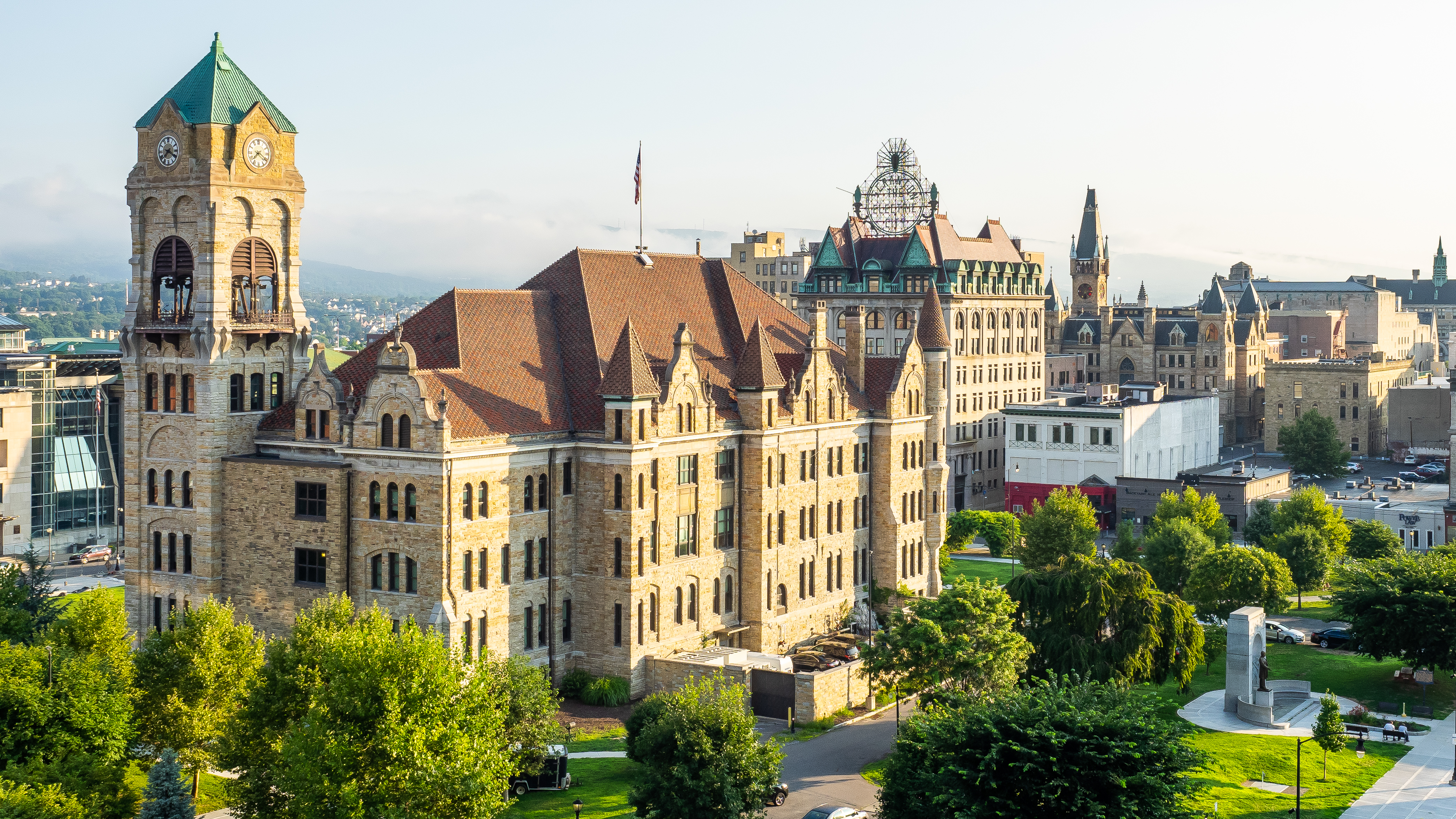
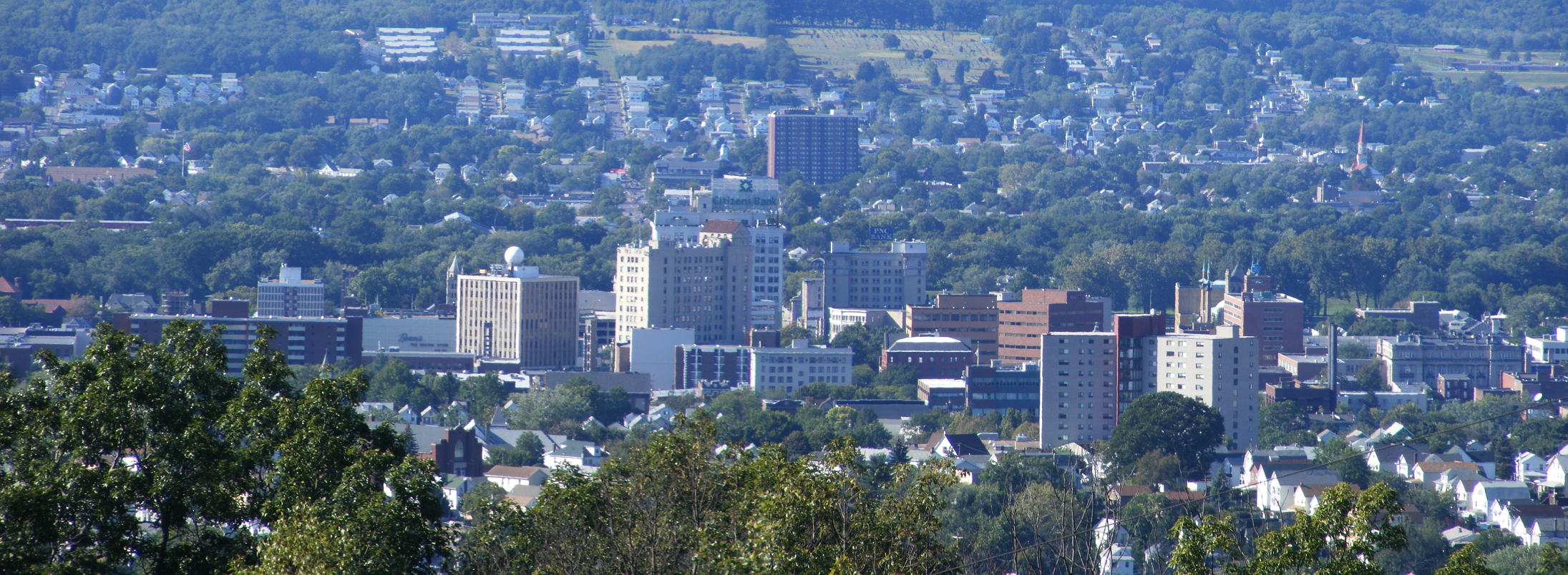
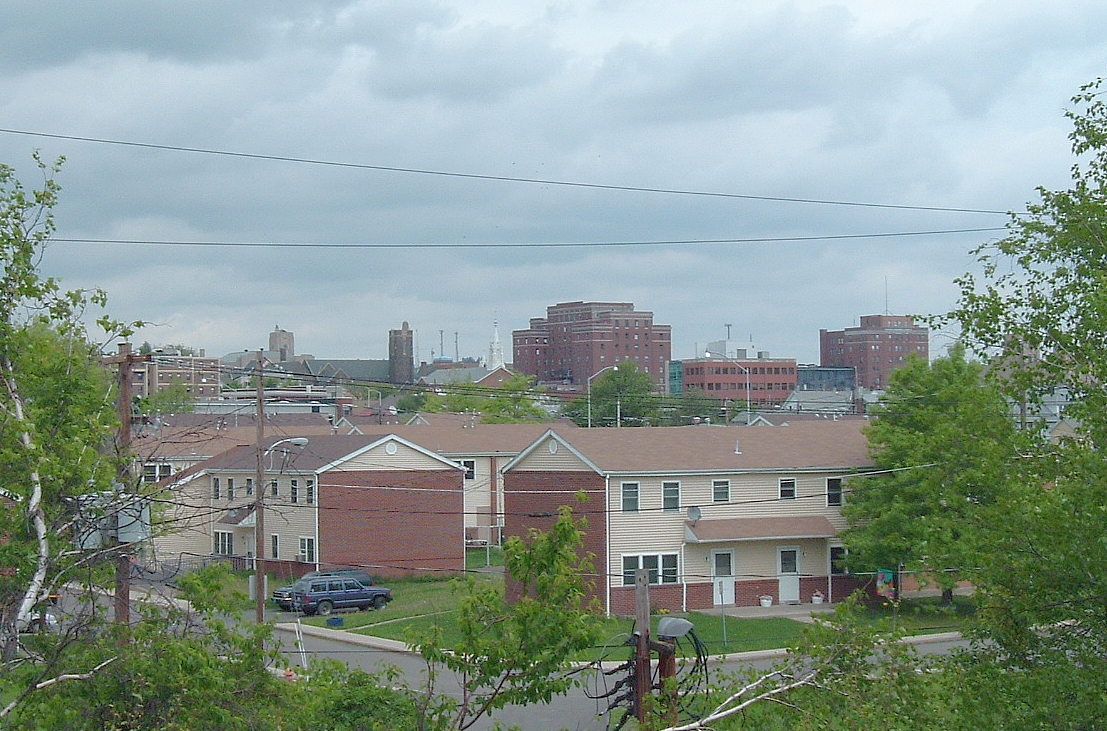
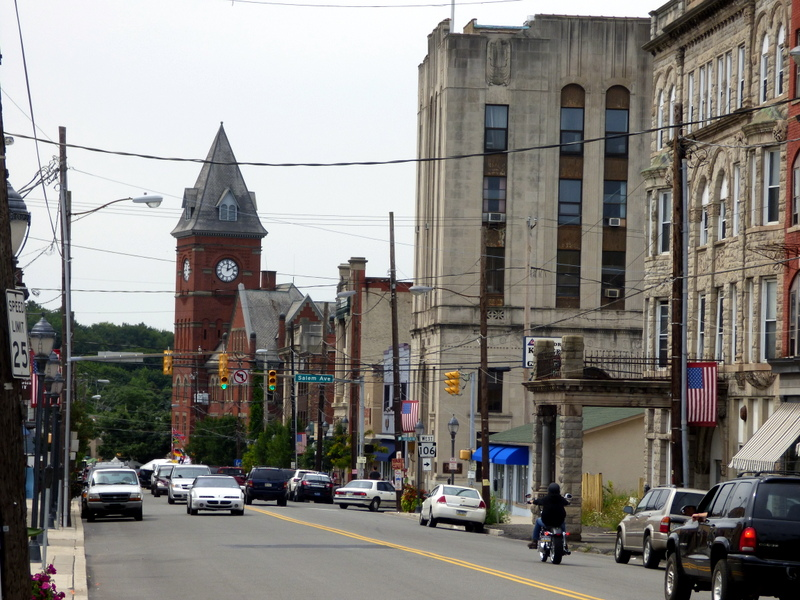
- Scranton Wilkes-Barre Hazleton Carbondale
Map of Scranton–Wilkes-Barre, PA Area MSA
Scranton–Wilkes-Barre, PA MSA
City of Scranton
City of Wilkes-Barre
- Country: United States
- State: Pennsylvania
- Largest city: Scranton
- Other cities: Wilkes-Barre; Hazleton; Carbondale; Pittston City (Greater Pittston); Nanticoke

Area
  - Total: 1,776 sq mi (4,600 km^{2})
- Highest elevation: 2,460 ft (750 m)
- Lowest elevation: 330 ft (100 m)

Population
  - Total: 567,559
  - Rank: 100th in the U.S.

GDP
  - Total: $34.511 billion (2023)
- Time zone: UTC−5 (EST)
  - Summer (DST): UTC−4 (EDT)

The Wyoming Valley is a historic, industrialized region of Northeastern Pennsylvania consisting of Lackawanna, Wyoming, and Luzerne counties, with Luzerne being the largest in terms of both area and population. The region is historically notable for its influence in helping fuel the American Industrial Revolution with its many anthracite coal mines. As a metropolitan area, it is known as the Scranton–Wilkes-Barre metropolitan area, after its principal cities, Scranton and Wilkes-Barre. With a population of 567,559 as of the 2020 United States census, it is the fifth-largest metropolitan area in Pennsylvania, after the Philadelphia metropolitan area, Greater Pittsburgh, the Lehigh Valley, and the Harrisburg–Carlisle metropolitan statistical areas.

Within the geology of Pennsylvania, the Wyoming Valley makes up its own unique physiographic province, the Anthracite Valley. Greater Pittston occupies the center of the valley. Scranton is the most populated city in the metropolitan area with a population of 77,114. The city of Scranton grew in population after the 2015 mid-term census while Wilkes-Barre declined in population. Wilkes-Barre remains the second most-populated city in the metropolitan area, while Hazleton is the third most-populated city in the metropolitan area.

The valley is a crescent-shaped depression, a part of the ridge-and-valley or folded Appalachians. The Susquehanna River occupies the southern part of the valley, which is notable for its deposits of anthracite. These have been extensively mined. Deep mining of anthracite has declined throughout the greater Coal Region, however, due to the greater economics of strip mining. Parts of the local mines had already shut down because some coal beds were on fire and had to be sealed, but the exodus of mining companies came quickly following the legal and political repercussions of the 1959 Knox Mine disaster when the roof of the Knox Coal Company's mine under the Susquehanna River collapsed.

The Pocono Mountains, a ridgeline away, are often visible from higher elevations to the east and to the southeast of the Wyoming Valley. (Note: The Poconos being bounded by the Lehigh River Valley on their west side, whose east bank watershed begins on the divide of the Penobscot Knob ridgeline east of the Valley.)

== Name ==
Wyoming is an English and German corruption of the Munsee word chewewamink (xwéːwamənk), meaning "at the big river flat." John Heckewelder, a Moravian missionary fluent in Munsee, recorded the name as M'cheuomi or M'cheuwami. Isaac Chapman, in A Sketch of the History of Wyoming—published posthumously in 1830—gave the name as Maughwauwame. In November 1742, Nicholas Zinzendorf, a Moravian bishop who had traveled to the Wyoming Valley to proselytize the Indigenous inhabitants, wrote a hymn titled "Aus dem Zelte vor Wayomik, in der grossen Ebene Skehandowana." This translates as "From the tent before Wayomik, on the great plain of Skehandowana." The modern spelling of Wyoming first appeared earlier that year in the Minutes of the Provincial Council of Pennsylvania. On Lewis Evans's 1749 map, "Wioming" designates a village on the west side of the Susquehanna River.

== History ==
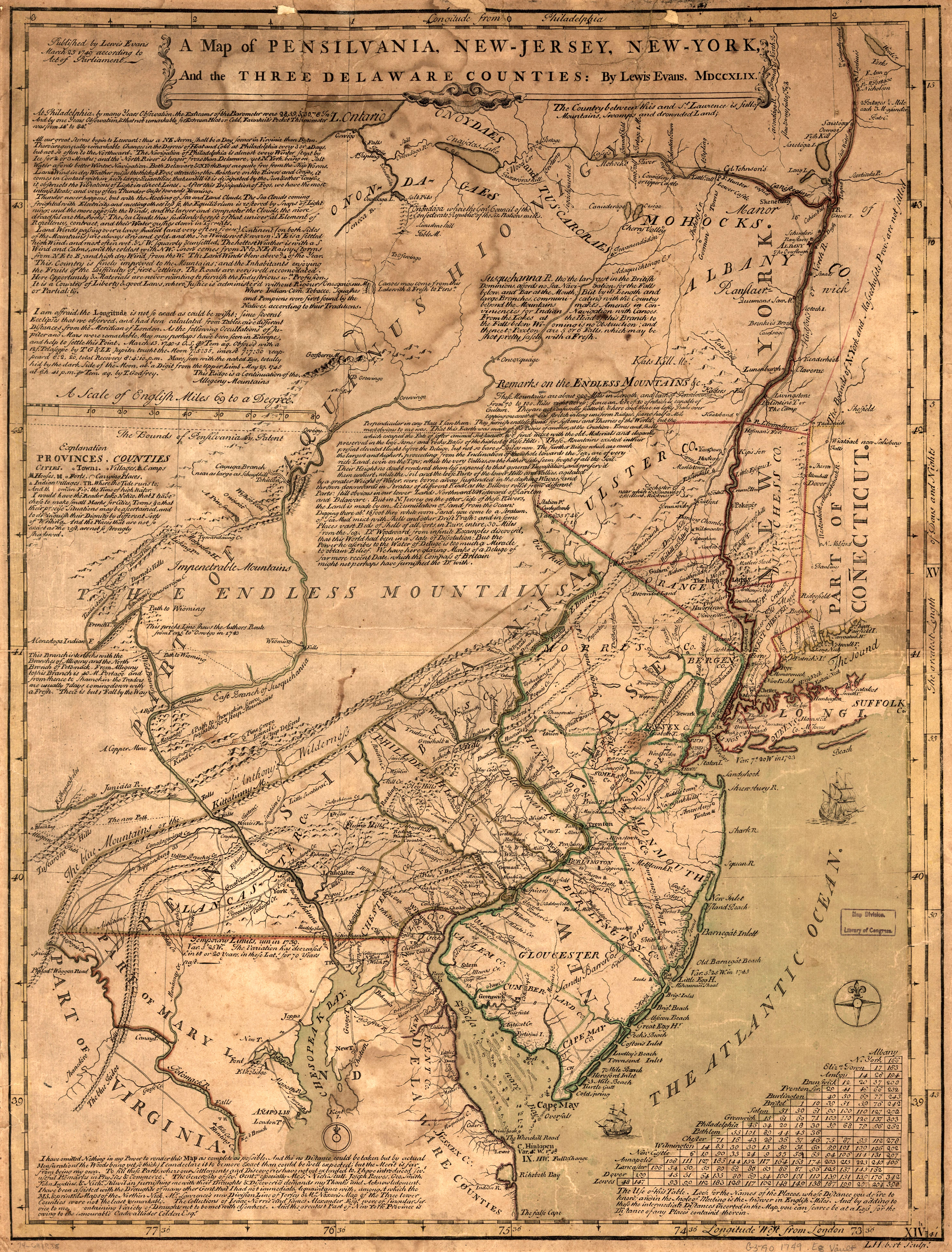
Lewis Evan's 1749 Map of Pensilvania, New-Jersey, New-York, and the Three Delaware Counties.

For thousands of years, nomadic bands of hunter-gatherers used the Wyoming Valley for hunting, fishing, foraging, and toolmaking. Numerous artifacts from the Archaic period (about 8000–1200 BC) including spear points, net weights, and scrapers have been found in the valley. During the Early and Middle Woodland periods (about 1200 BC–AD 950) hunting, fishing, and gathering remained the primary means of subsistence, however, Indigenous groups likely established semi-permanent seasonal camps on the valley's floodplains. Pottery sherds and projectile points dating to these periods have been uncovered at a few sites. In the Late Woodland period (about AD 950–1550) more permanent settlements emerged. The bow and arrow replaced the atlatl (spear-thrower) as the principal hunting weapon, and horticulture became widespread. Evidence of maize (corn) cultivation dating to around AD 1300 has been found at a site near the confluence of the Lackawanna and Susquehanna rivers. Two palisaded village sites from the fifteenth and early sixteenth centuries have been identified across the river from present-day Wilkes-Barre.

In the first half of the 17th century, the Wyoming Valley may have been the home of the Scahentoarrhonon. The name appears in the Jesuit Relations in a list of Iroquoian-speaking nations and has been translated as "Nation of the Great Meadow." Early ethnolinguist J. N. B. Hewitt believed that this referred to the Wyoming Valley and stated that the area was known as Scahentowanen by the Haudenosaunee. Archaeologists, however, have not been able to find any evidence of permanent Indigenous occupation in this region during the 17th century.

Following the 1675 dispersal of the Susquehannock, who lived on the river's main branch, the Haudenosaunee claimed control of the entire Susquehanna watershed by right of conquest. They invited displaced Shawnee, Nanticoke, Mahican, and Lenape bands fleeing European encroachment to settle in the Wyoming Valley and downriver at Shamokin. The first of the Shawnee settled there around 1701, followed by a second group in 1729. Most moved west to the Ohio Country in 1744. The Nanticoke established a village in the valley in 1748 but relocated further up the Susquehanna River five years later.

In 1737, the Lenape living near the Forks of the Delaware were tricked into ceding roughly 1,200 square miles (3,100 km^{2}) of their territory on the west side of the Delaware River in what is known as the Walking Purchase. They consequently refused to leave their homes and asked the Haudenosaunee to intervene. In 1742, the Onondaga arbitrator Canassatego ordered the Lenape to relocate to the Wyoming Valley.

Moravian missionaries frequently visited the Wyoming Valley in the 1740s and 1750s. Among those associated with the valley were David Zeisberger, who spent more than sixty years ministering to the Lenape in Pennsylvania and the Ohio Country, and Christian Frederick Post, who married a Lenape woman and lived in the valley for several years.

During the French and Indian War, the Lenape who lived in the valley, resentful over the loss of their traditional territory, took part in raids against isolated frontier farms to the east. Their leader, Teedyuscung, was a lapsed Moravian convert who, in 1754, had led 65–70 Lenape and Mahican to the Wyoming Valley from the mission settlement of Gnadenhütten of the Lehigh River. In 1756, Teedyuscung "put down the hatchet" and accepted an offer to meet with Pennsylvania's lieutenant governor. In a series of conferences at Easton, Teedyuscung explained that the Lenape had gone to war due to their lingering anger over the Walking Purchase, and advocated for the Wyoming Valley to become the permanent homeland for his people. His proposal was not addressed during negotiations, and under pressure from the Haudenosaunee, Teedyuscung reluctantly accepted the terms offered in the 1758 Treaty of Easton.

=== Pennamite-Yankee Wars ===
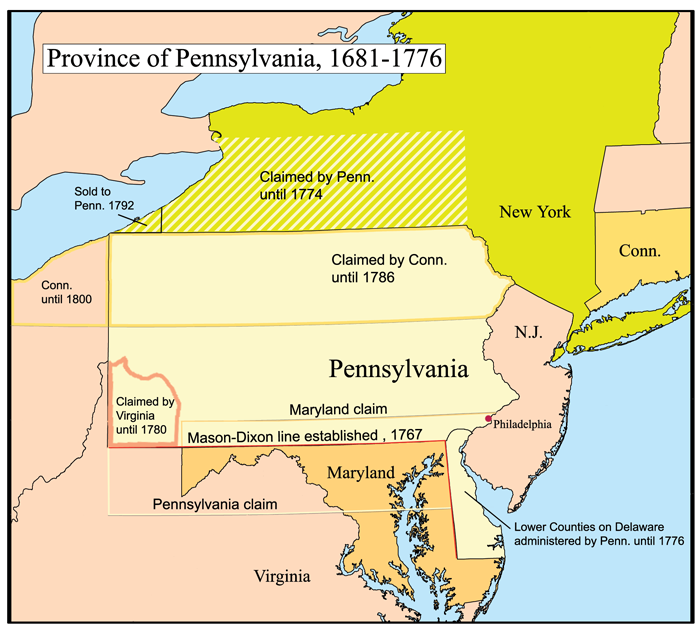
A map of Pennsylvania and the competing land claims during the colonial era

Overlapping royal charters gave both Pennsylvania and Connecticut a claim to the Wyoming Valley. In 1662, King Charles II had granted Connecticut a "sea-to-sea" charter extending its territory westward and including most of the North Branch of the Susquehanna River. Nineteen years later, however, the King issued William Penn a patent for Pennsylvania that extended northward into Connecticut's claim.

In 1753, Connecticut speculators formed the Susquehanna Company to colonize the Wyoming Valley. A year later, during the Albany Congress, the company secured a fraudulent deed from a few unauthorized Mohawk and Oneida leaders who had been plied with liquor. The Haudenosaunee Grand Council repudiated the sale and asserted its authority over the region, but the Susquehanna Company ignored the Council's protest and insisted that the transaction was valid.

The French and Indian War delayed colonization plans, but in 1762, the Susquehanna Company sent an advance party of surveyors and laborers to the valley. They were warned off by Teedyuscung, who afterwards protested the incursion to Pennsylvania Governor James Hamilton. In April 1763, Teedyuscung was assassinated when his cabin was set on fire. Twenty other cabins were torched, forcing the Lenape survivors to flee. Pennsylvania officials blamed the Haudenosaunee. However, a large contingent of settlers from Connecticut arrived two weeks later. The Lenape, led by Teedyuscung's son, Tachgokanhelle (also known as Captain Bull), subsequently attacked the settlement in what is known as the Mill Creek Massacre. At least ten colonists were killed, a number were taken captive, and the rest fled back east.

When Connecticut settlers (Yankees) returned a few years later, both they and Pennsylvania authorities built competing forts, leading to the Pennamite Wars. The Susquehanna Company eventually hired Lazarus Stewart and his Paxton Boys to drive the Pennsylvanians (Pennamites) out. Despite a number of setbacks, the Yankees emerged victorious in 1771 when the Pennsylvania fort capitulated after a one-month siege.

The Yankee-Pennamite Wars resumed in August 1775 when a Pennsylvania force of several hundred men approached the Wyoming Valley from the south. Connecticut raised four hundred men under Colonel Zebulon Butler and a confrontation took place over two days at Christmas. Stewart, with twenty men, ambushed the Pennamites on Christmas Eve as they attempted to cross to the east side of the Susquehanna under cover of darkness. On Christmas Day, the Pennamites attacked Butler's position but were forced to withdraw.

=== American Revolutionary War ===
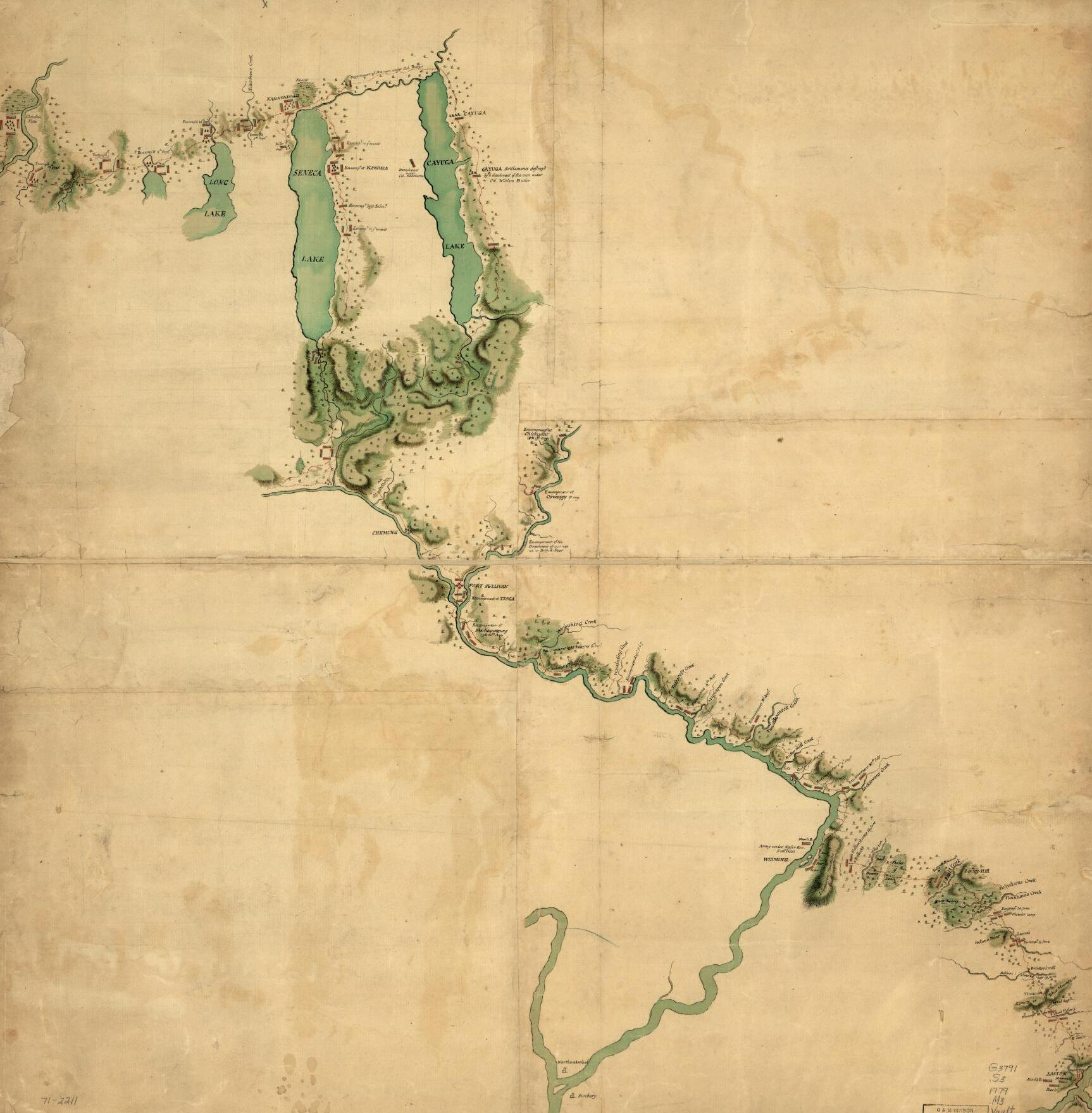
Map showing the route of the 1779 Sullivan Expedition from the Wyoming Valley

In 1776, Connecticut formally established Westmoreland County. In the summer of 1778, a force of Loyalist soldiers led by Major John Butler and Seneca warriors led by Cornplanter and Sayenqueraghta descended the Susquehanna River to attack the settlements in the Wyoming Valley. On July 3, most of the Patriot militiamen who marched out to meet them were killed at the Battle of Wyoming. Widespread looting and burning of buildings occurred throughout the area in the days after the battle. Non-combatants were not physically harmed but fled across the Pocono Mountains or down the Susquehanna River to Fort Augusta.

In response to attacks on frontier settlements including the Wyoming Valley and Cherry Valley raids, General George Washington ordered a retaliatory scorched-earth campaign against the Haudenosaunee. In 1779, Major General John Sullivan used the Wyoming Valley as a staging area before heading north into Seneca and Cayuga territory. Sullivan's army destroyed crops, winter food stores and 40 villages— which forced thousands of displaced Haudenosaunee to flee to Fort Niagara. Hundreds died from exposure and starvation that winter.

=== Founding of Luzerne County ===
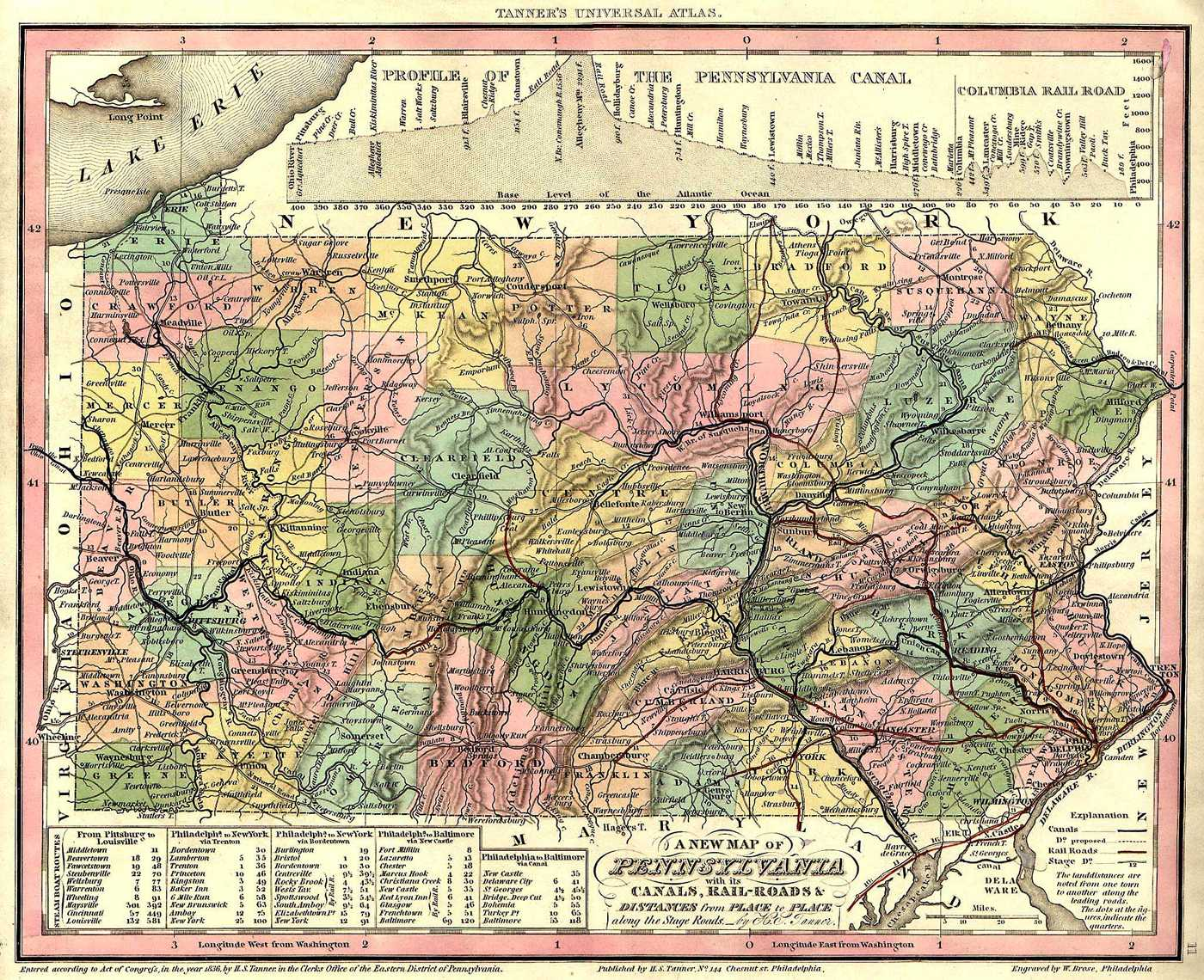
A map of Pennsylvania counties in 1836; at the time, Lackawanna and Wyoming were still part of Luzerne County.

In December 1782, a Continental Congress commission awarded Pennsylvania jurisdiction over the territory claimed by both Pennsylvania and Connecticut. As a result, the Wyoming Valley became part of Northumberland County. Two years later, Pennsylvania militia evicted Connecticut settlers from their homes, sparking the Third Pennamite War. Peace was achieved through the Confirming Act of 1787, a compromise in which Pennsylvania maintained political control over the territory but validated the land titles of the original Connecticut settlers. To address settlers' concerns, Pennsylvania had created Luzerne County in 1786, naming it in honor of the Chevalier de la Luzerne, the French minister to the United States during the Revolution. When it was founded, Luzerne County occupied a large portion of Northeastern Pennsylvania. Between 1810 and 1878, it was divided into several smaller counties. The counties of Bradford, Lackawanna, Susquehanna, and Wyoming were all formed from parts of Luzerne County.

== Metropolitan statistical area ==
The Scranton–Wilkes-Barre–Hazleton, PA Metropolitan Statistical Area, also known as the Wyoming Valley, covers Lackawanna, Luzerne, and Wyoming counties. It had a combined population of 558,166 in 2015. The counties adjacent to Wyoming Valley include Monroe County (Southeast), Susquehanna County (Northeast), Wayne County (East), Columbia County (West), Bradford County (Northwest), Carbon County (South), Sullivan County (West) and Schuylkill County (Southwest).

As of the 2000 census, the area also had the highest percentage of non-Hispanic whites of any U.S. metropolitan area with a population over 500,000, with 96.2% of the population stating their race as white alone and not claiming Hispanic ethnicity, however the Hispanic demographic has been significantly rising since then.

When metropolitan areas were first defined in 1950, Scranton and Wilkes-Barre were in separate metropolitan areas. Lackawanna County was defined as the Scranton Standard Metropolitan Area, while Luzerne County was defined as the Wilkes-Barre–Hazleton metropolitan area. The two metropolitan areas were merged after the 1970 census as the Northeast Pennsylvania Standard metropolitan statistical area, with Monroe County added as a component. It was renamed the Scranton–Wilkes-Barre metropolitan statistical area after the 1980 census, and Columbia and Wyoming counties were added. Hazleton was added as a primary city in the 1990 census, while Monroe County lost its metropolitan status.

After the 2000 census, Columbia County lost metropolitan status, while Hazleton was removed as a primary city. Scranton is the largest city in Lackawanna County as well as the entire metropolitan area by a large margin, nearly doubling the population of the second largest city in the metropolitan area, Wilkes-Barre.

County	2025 estimate	2020 Census	Change	Area	Density
Luzerne County	332,136	325,594	+2.01%	890.33 sq mi (2,305.9 km^{2})	373/sq mi (144/km^{2})
Lackawanna County	216,502	215,896	+0.28%	459.08 sq mi (1,189.0 km^{2})	472/sq mi (182/km^{2})
Wyoming County	25,790	26,069	−1.07%	397.32 sq mi (1,029.1 km^{2})	65/sq mi (25/km^{2})
Total MSA Population	574,418	567,559	+1.21%	1,746.73 sq mi (4,524.0 km^{2})	329/sq mi (127/km^{2})

== Physical valley ==
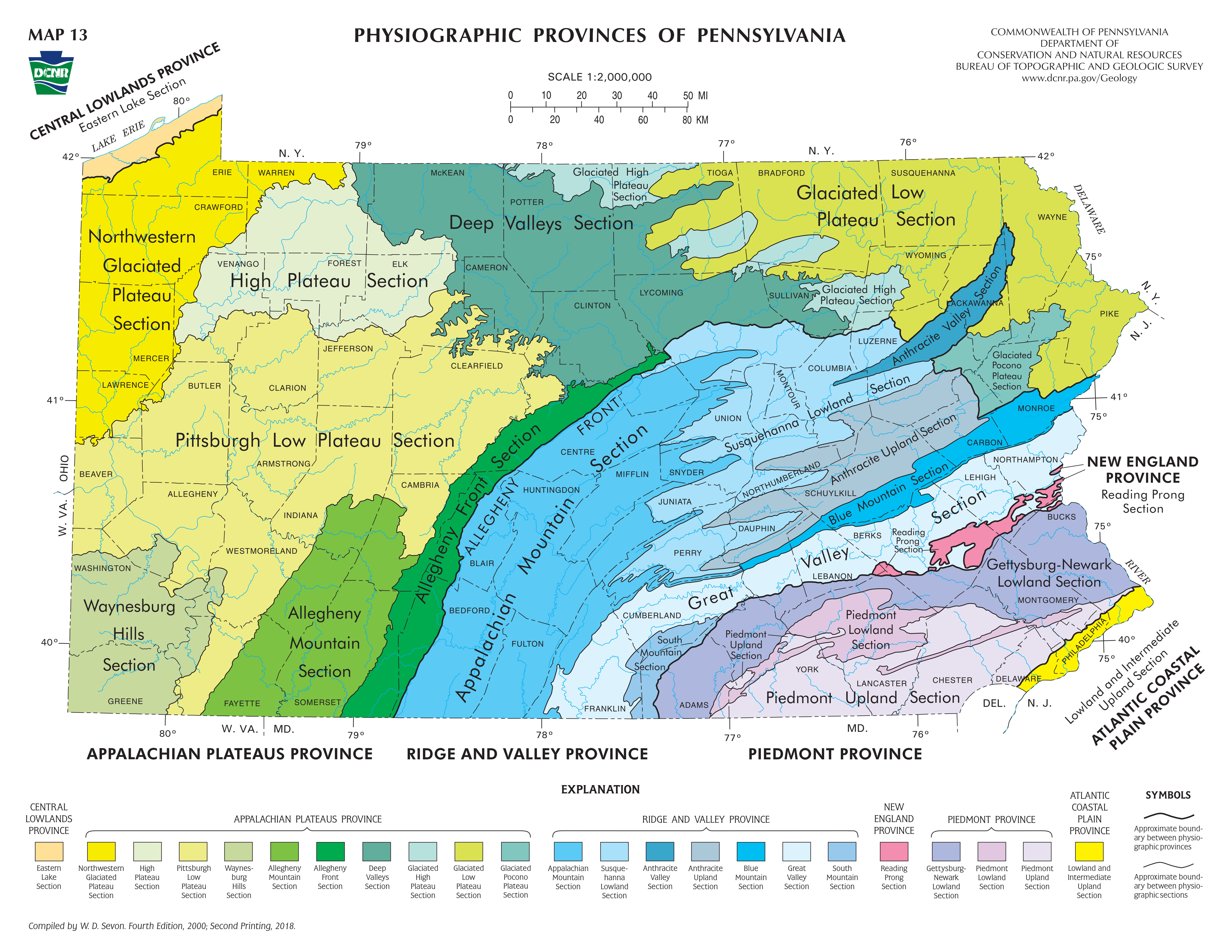
The Anthracite Valley Section is visible in the northeast

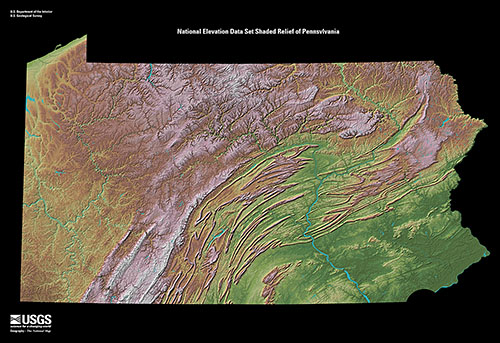
The physical valley can be seen in the northeast

Geographically, the Lackawanna Valley and Wyoming Valley form a continuous, crescent-shaped urban pool nestled between the Pocono and Endless Mountains. It is about 25 miles (40 km) long and extends from the counties of Susquehanna and Wayne (in the north) to Columbia County (in the south). It includes the cities of Carbondale, Scranton, Pittston, Wilkes-Barre, and Nanticoke.

The physical valley (the Anthracite Valley Section) and the Wyoming Valley Metropolitan Statistical Area are distinct entities. While Wyoming County is included in the metropolitan area, it lies outside the boundaries of the physical valley itself.

== Culture ==
Scranton is the cultural center of the Wyoming Valley, being the largest city by population in the metropolitan area.

=== Sports ===
The Wyoming Valley also has professional sports teams; they include the Scranton/Wilkes-Barre Highlanders (Minor League Baseball Class AAA), the Wilkes-Barre/Scranton Penguins (American Hockey League), and the Scranton/Wilkes-Barre Steamers (Premier Basketball League). The Wilkes-Barre/Scranton Pioneers were a minor league arena football team in Wilkes-Barre (from 2001 to 2009).

=== Local attractions ===
Local attractions include the Mohegan Sun Arena at Casey Plaza in Wilkes-Barre, the Pocono Raceway in Long Pond, PNC Field in Moosic, Mohegan Pennsylvania in Plains, the Toyota Pavilion in Scranton, the Wyoming Valley Mall in Wilkes-Barre, the Shoppes at Montage in Moosic, the Steamtown Mall in Scranton, the Viewmont Mall in Scranton/Dickson City, Pennsylvania, and the Montage Mountain Waterpark/Ski Resort in Scranton. Other historic attractions include Eckley Miners' Village and the Steamtown National Historic Site.

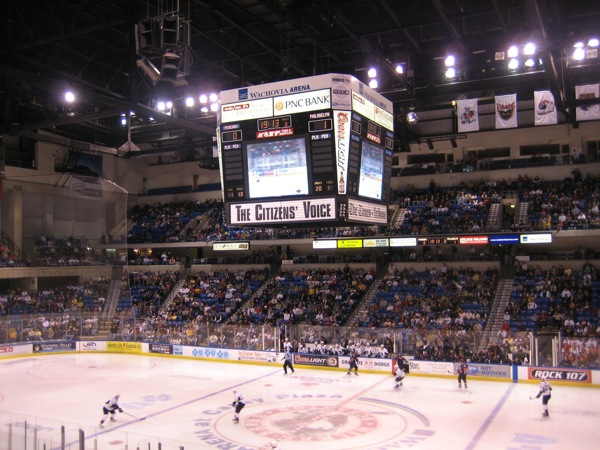
Mohegan Sun Arena at Casey Plaza in Wilkes-Barre Township

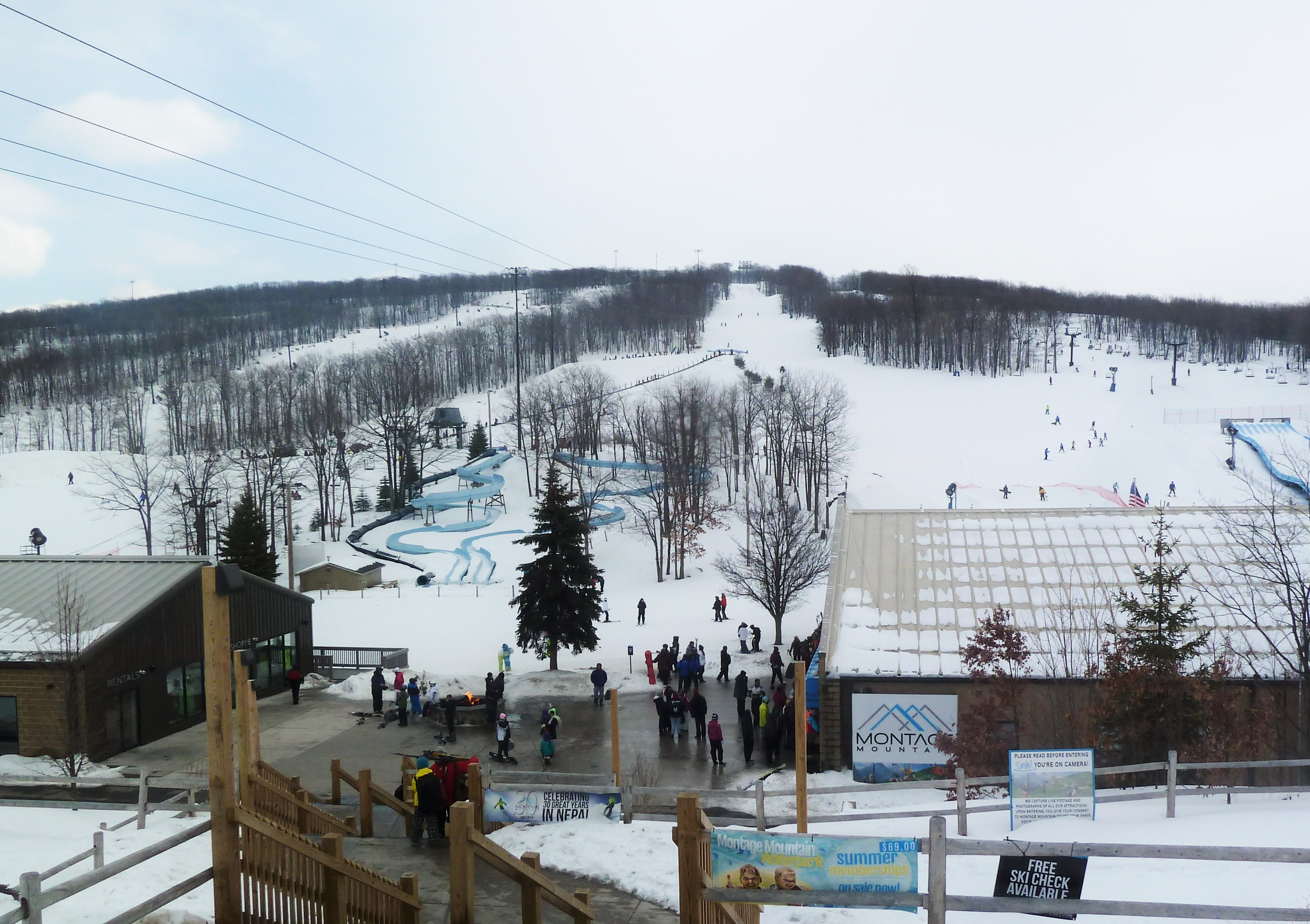
Montage Mountain Ski Resort in Scranton

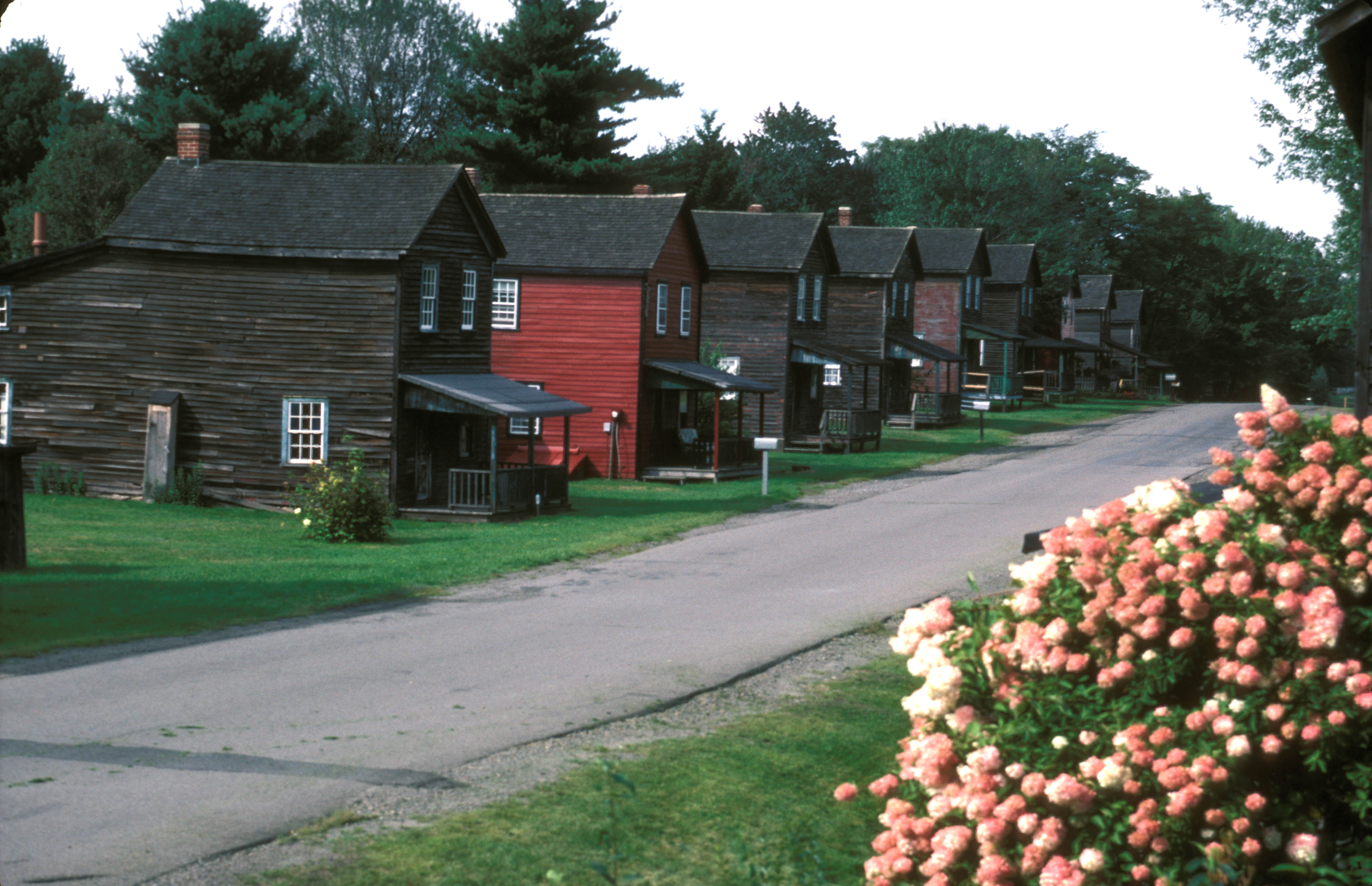
Eckley Miners' Village in Foster Township

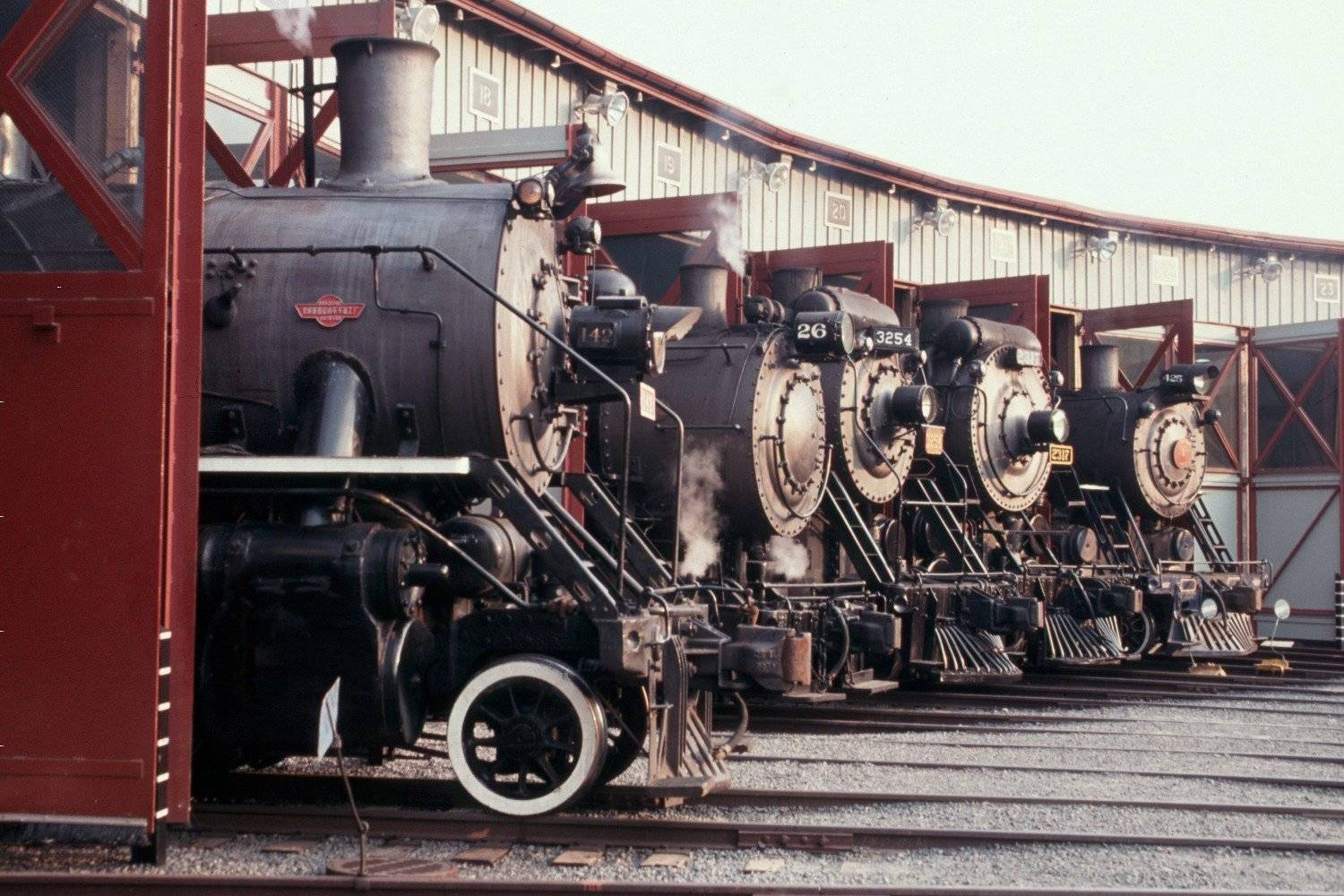
Steamtown National Historic Site in Scranton

== Literature ==
This area is celebrated in Lydia Sigourney's poem Vale of Wyoming published in her Scenes in my Native Land, 1845, with accompanying descriptive text.

In the science-fiction story Armageddon 2419 A.D. by Philip Francis Nowlan, American Radioactive Gas Corporation employee Anthony "Buck" Rogers is investigating an abandoned coal mine in the Wyoming Valley when a cave-in traps him. A gas which fills the mine shaft places him in suspended animation for nearly 500 years. He awakens to find that the United States has been destroyed by a Chinese invasion, and he joins a "gang" of Americans who survive by hiding in the forests of the Wyoming Valley area. With the help of Buck's experience as a soldier in World War I, they unite all of the scattered Americans in a "Second War of Independence" against the "Han" colonial administration.

== Transportation ==
The airports for this area are Wilkes-Barre/Scranton International Airport and the Wilkes-Barre Wyoming Valley Airport.

== See also ==
- Northeast Pennsylvania English
- Pennamite-Yankee War
- Battle of Wyoming
