= The Valley of Wyoming =

1865 painting by Jasper Francis Cropsey

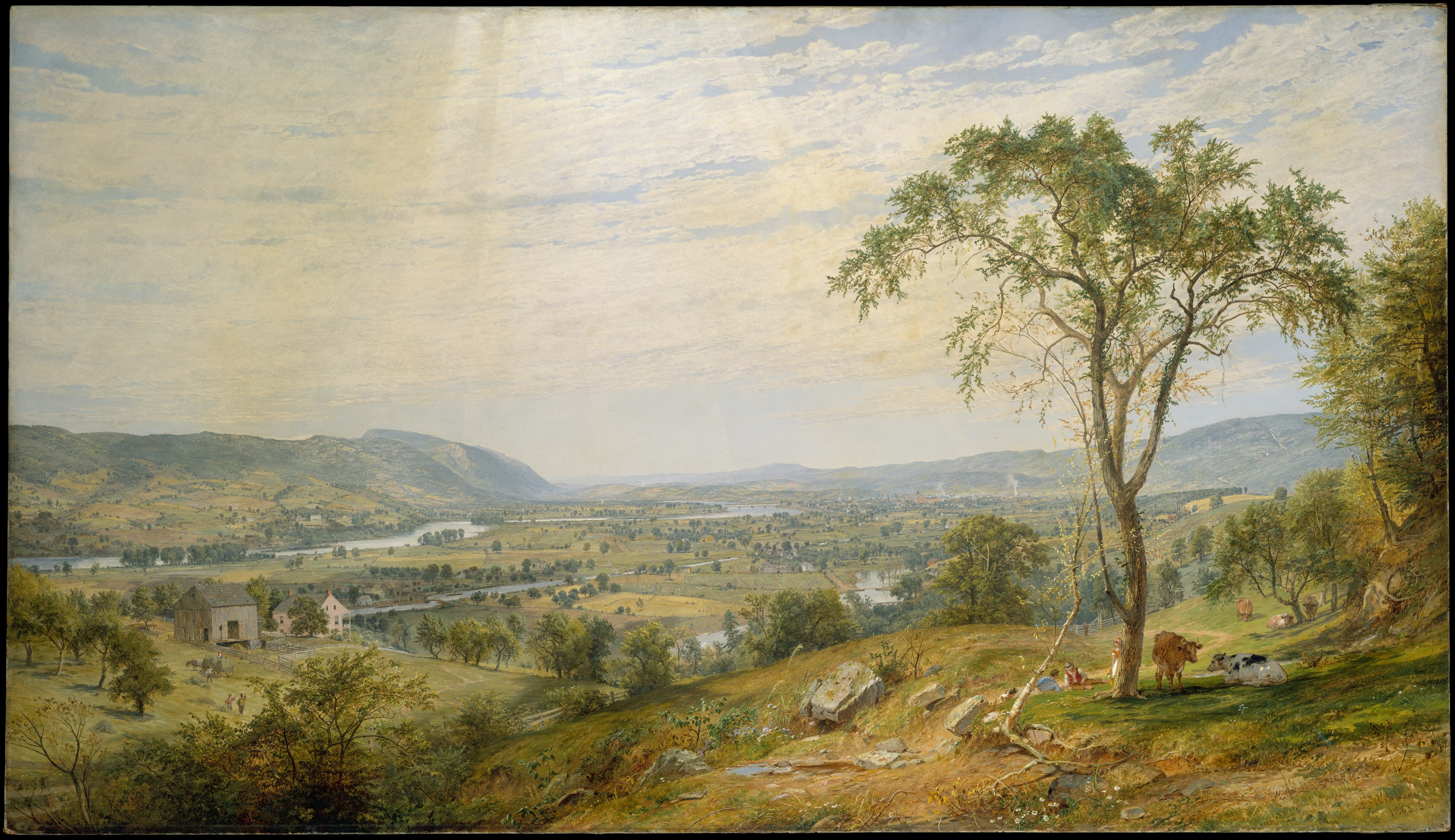
- Artist: Jasper Francis Cropsey
- Year: 1865
- Medium: Oil on canvas
- Dimensions: 123.2 cm × 213.4 cm (48.5 in × 84.0 in)
- Location: Metropolitan Museum of Art; New York City

The Valley of Wyoming is an 1865 painting by American painter Jasper Francis Cropsey. Cropsey, a prominent landscape painter, rendered Valley so as to depict the Wyoming Valley in Northeastern Pennsylvania. The painting was commissioned by Milton Courtright, who was born in the valley, for $3,500. The work is in the collection of the Metropolitan Museum of Art.
