= Susquehanna Company =

18th century land speculation company based in Connecticut

The Susquehanna Company was a land speculation company founded in Windham, Connecticut in July 1753. The company's purchase of the Wyoming Valley in what is now northeastern Pennsylvania triggered the Pennamite–Yankee Wars, one of the most prolonged and violent land disputes in early American history.

== Formation and early years ==
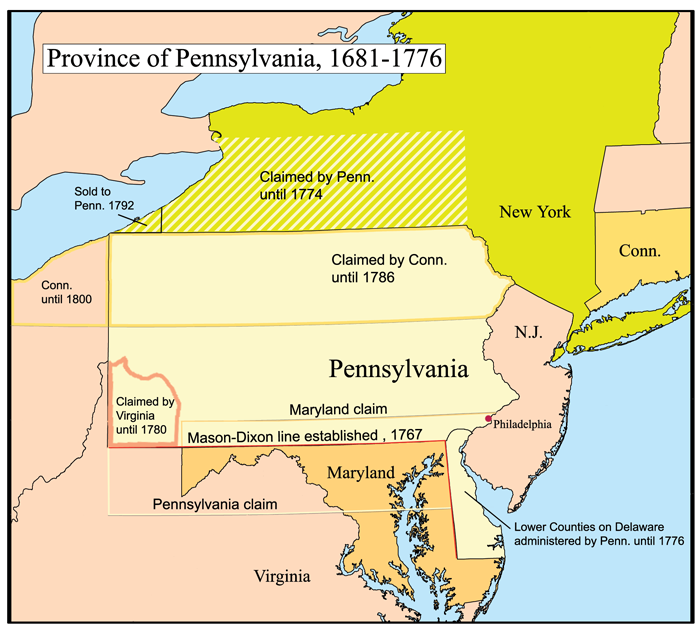
Overlapping land claims of Pennsylvania and Connecticut

Under the 1662 Royal Charter granted by King Charles II, Connecticut’s western boundary was defined as stretching all the way to the "South Sea" (the Pacific Ocean). Because maps of the era were inaccurate, Connecticut's charter overlapped the territory that was granted to William Penn, founder of Pennsylvania, in 1681.

For almost a century, Connecticut's western claim lay dormant, but by the mid-18th century, the New England colony faced a growing population and a shortage of farmland. To solve this problem, speculators looked westward to the Susquehanna River's fertile Wyoming Valley. In July 1753, the Susquehanna Company was formed with the goal of acquiring the valley from the Haudenosaunee Confederacy and encouraging settlers from Connecticut to move there. Within a year the company had 800 shareholders.

Wars against the Susquehannock in the 17th century had given the Haudenosaunee control over the Wyoming Valley. Pennsylvania's proprietary government recognized Haudenosaunee jurisdiction, while the Confederacy had agreed to sell lands within the Penn grant only to the proprietors. At the 1754 Albany Congress, Pennsylvania sought to purchase the Wyoming Valley, but Hendrick Theyanoguin, speaking on behalf of the Haudenosaunee, refused to sell, telling Pennsylvania's representatives:

We will never part with the Land at Shamokin and Wyomink, our Bones are scattered there, and on this Land there has always been a great Council Fire. We desire You will not take it amiss, that we will not part with it, for We reserve it to settle such of our Nations upon as shall come to Us from the Ohio, or any others who shall deserve to be in our Alliance.

The Haudenosaunee were also aware that the Susquehanna Company wished to purchase the Wyoming Valley. Hendrick explained, “Neither shall have it. We will not part with it to neither of You.” Despite this, Susquehanna Company agent John Henry Lydius operated in secret to acquire the valley, allegedly plying a group of lesser Mohawk leaders with alcohol and bribes to obtain a deed. The leaders who signed the deed, however, had no authority to conduct the sale. Nor was any consideration given to the Lenape whom the Haudenosaunee allowed to live in the Wyoming Valley.

Settlement of the Wyoming Valley was delayed by the outbreak of the French and Indian War, which made the frontier dangerously unsafe for new settlers. The Haudenosaunee had repudiated the sale in 1761, but the Susquehanna Company nevertheless began efforts to establish a settlement. In 1762, a party of surveyors and labourers arrived but were warned off by the Lenape leader Teedyuscung whose village was in the valley. In April 1763, Teedyuscung was assassinated when his cabin was set on fire. Twenty other cabins were torched, forcing the Lenape survivors to flee. A large group of settlers from Connecticut arrived two weeks later. In October 1763, the Lenape, led by Teedyuscung's son, Tachgokanhelle (also known as Captain Bull), attacked the nascent settlement in what is known as the Mill Creek massacre. At least ten colonists were killed, a number were taken captive, and the rest fled back east.

As a result of the 1768 Treaty of Fort Stanwix, the Haudenosaunee sold to Pennsylvania's proprietors a substantial tract of land that included the Wyoming Valley. The purchase put Pennsylvania's claim to the valley in direct conflict with that of the Susquehanna Company, which responded by renewing its settlement efforts. In February 1769, a group of pioneers from Connecticut known as the “First Forty” arrived to establish a permanent presence. These “Yankees” soon came into conflict with Pennsylvania's government and with Pennsylvania settlers (dubbed “Pennamites”), triggering what became known as the Pennamite–Yankee Wars. Both sides built forts, raised militias, and repeatedly arrested or drove each other out of the valley.

In the fall of 1769, Lazarus Stewart, one of the perpetrators of the 1763 Conestoga Massacre, offered to rid the valley of Pennamites in exchange for land, prompting the Susquehanna Company to enlist him and his Paxton Boys to defend the purchase. After a series of attacks and counterattacks, Stewart and Zebulon Butler led a month-long siege of Fort Wyoming in the summer of 1771, which ended with the withdrawal of the Pennamites and left the Connecticut settlers in control of the Wyoming Valley for the next twelve years.

After years of lobbying by Susquehanna Company shareholders, Connecticut formally annexed the territory in January 1774, incorporating it as the town of Westmoreland and attaching it to Litchfield County. In December 1775, the Continental Congress provisionally recognized Connecticut's authority over the area pending a final resolution of the dispute. In July 1776, Westmoreland was reorganized as a county, with Wilkes-Barre as its county seat.

The conflict in the Wyoming Valley between Pennamites and Yankees was overshadowed by the Revolutionary War. In July 1778, a combined force of Haudenosaunee warriors and Loyalist soldiers commanded by Major John Butler routed the Patriot militia commanded by Zebulon Butler at the Battle of Wyoming. Widespread looting and burning of buildings throughout the valley occurred after the battle, but non-combatants were not physically harmed. Most of the inhabitants fled across the Pocono Mountains to Stroudsburg and Easton or rafted down the Susquehanna River to Sunbury. Some valley inhabitants returned following the 1779 Sullivan Expedition, but most waited until the Revolutionary War was over.

== Revival, conflict, and resolution ==
In 1782, Pennsylvania formally challenged Connecticut's jurisdiction under Article IX of the Articles of Confederation. A special congressional court convened in Trenton, New Jersey, and in late December unanimously ruled in favor of Pennsylvania’s sovereignty over the territory. The Trenton Decree, however, only settled political jurisdiction, not the property rights of those who had acquired land from the Susquehanna Company.

The Susquehanna Company had fallen into abeyance during the Revolutionary War but was resurrected afterwards. After its revival, most company decisions were made by a small group of commissioners and officers rather than by direct vote of the shareholders. Although the Trenton Decree appeared to have extinguished its prospects, the company resumed its colonization efforts in July 1785 by offering 300-acre “half-share” grants to settlers who would immediately occupy the land, remain for three years, and uphold Connecticut's charter claim.

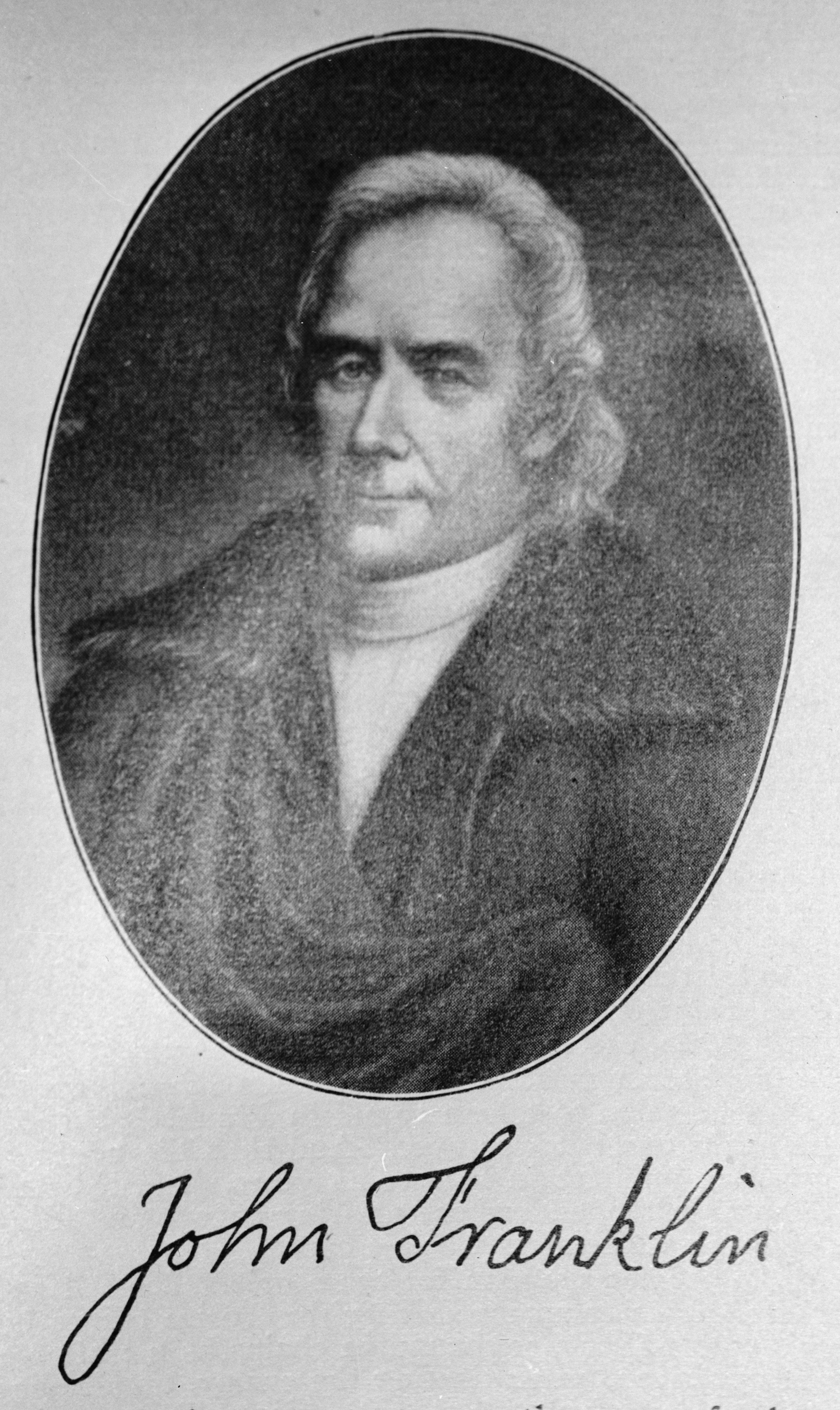
John Franklin (1749-1831) was a leader of the Wild Yankees during the Pennamite-Yankee Wars.

In the immediate aftermath of the Trenton decision, Pennsylvania sought to remove Connecticut settlers from the Wyoming Valley, reigniting the Pennamite-Yankee War. In May 1784, the Pennamites, led by magistrate Alexander Patterson, forcibly removed about 150 Connecticut families with the assistance of Fort Wyoming's garrison of Pennsylvania soldiers. The Yankees, led by John Franklin, retaliated when the troops were withdrawn that summer, driving away many of the Pennamites who had recently received grants from Pennsylvania. A “culture of violence” developed, characterized by threats, harassment, intimidation, theft, vandalism, assaults, arson, kidnappings, and several murders.

In an attempt to restore order, the Pennsylvania General Assembly created Luzerne County in 1786. In 1787 it passed the Confirming Act, which recognized the tenure of settlers who had claimed and occupied land before 1782. The act, however, did not recognize the claims of land speculators, nor did it confirm the title of those from Connecticut who had settled in the Wyoming region after the Trenton decision.

The Confirming Act angered people on both sides of the dispute. Many settlers who had received title from Pennsylvania were forced to give up their homes in exchange for uncleared land elsewhere in the state. At the same time, recently arrived Connecticut settlers found themselves without legal right to their properties, ensuring resistance. This compromise also triggered protests from Pennsylvania land speculators, who lobbied the state to protect their property rights, and the Susquehanna Company, which saw its corporate investments threatened. Because of this opposition, the Confirming Act was suspended a year later and officially repealed in 1790.

The collapse of the Confirming Act exposed deep fractures among the Yankee settlers. Moderates, weary of decades of conflict, rallied behind Timothy Pickering. Pickering urged New England settlers to swear allegiance to the Commonwealth of Pennsylvania and obtain confirmation of their titles from the state. Meanwhile, the "Wild Yankees"—who were mostly "half-share men"—rejected Pennsylvania authority completely. Led by Franklin and covertly backed by the Susquehanna Company, this faction wanted the Trenton Decree overturned. The company sought support from Connecticut, securing an endorsement from the governor, although the Connecticut General Assembly declined to intervene on their behalf.

Franklin was arrested for treason in October 1787, charged with fomenting insurrection and resisting state authority. In June 1788, a band of Wild Yankees abducted Pickering from his home and held him captive for nearly three weeks in order to pressure Pennsylvania authorities to release their leader. Although the plan failed, the Pickering kidnapping marked a transition from an "often bloody dispute" to a reliance on political means and the courts to settle conflicts, although sporadic violence continued. Franklin embodied this shift, moving from insurgency to political action. Three years after his release in May 1789, Franklin was elected sheriff of Luzerne County in 1792 and later served multiple terms in the Pennsylvania General Assembly.

The end of the Susquehanna Company came through legal defeat and legislative compromise. The 1795 federal court ruling in Van Horne's Lessee v. Dorrance rejected the Connecticut claim to the Wyoming Region and described the 1754 purchase on which that claim rested as “radically defective and faulty.” The decision held that Connecticut settlers could not derive title from an unauthorized “Indian purchase” under Pennsylvania law. In 1799, Pennsylvania passed the Compromise Act, establishing commissioners to examine and settle the claims of settlers who had obtained deeds from the Susquehanna Company, thus providing a way to obtain Pennsylvania patents. As a result, the company ceased to have a legal basis for distributing land in Pennsylvania. At the same time, the opening of land in Western New York and the Northwest Territory drew away settlers and investors. With Pennsylvania now providing secure title to settlers, the Susquehanna Company's original purpose disappeared, and the organization ended operations in the early nineteenth century.

Today, the records, account books, and minutes of the Susquehanna Company (published as The Susquehannah Company Papers) serve as a genealogical and historical resource documenting westward expansion, land speculation, and interstate rivalry in the 18th century.
