= The Shoppes at Montage =

Shopping center in Moosic, Pennsylvania

Coordinates: 41.3625°N 75.6758°W

The Shoppes at Montage is a shopping center in Moosic, Pennsylvania. It opened on March 29, 2007. It is the first lifestyle shopping center in the area. Unlike other local shopping centers, it focuses on mid to high-end retailers and seeks to attract patrons from an area much larger than the Scranton/Wilkes-Barre area.

== Tenants ==
Retail tenants include J. Jill and Chico's. Restaurants include Longhorn Steakhouse, Panera Bread, Dave & Busters, and Pancheros Mexican Grill.

== Reaction and controversy ==
A 2005 survey by the Scranton Times-Tribune indicated that residents wanted a shopping center with more high-end retailers (although census show median household income in Lackawanna County, where the shops are located, is $37,545), as well as more variety than current local shopping options. Respondents also indicated that the new mall may help them avoid long drives to The Crossings Premium Outlets in Tannersville and the King of Prussia Mall near Philadelphia, where some currently travel to shop at high-end retailers.

Prizm Asset Management Company (then-owner of The Mall at Steamtown in Scranton) and PREIT (owner of Wyoming Valley Mall in Wilkes-Barre and Viewmont Mall in Dickson City) expressed both economic and environmental concerns about the new mall when it was proposed. Though the Moosic Borough Council consistently voted in favor of the project, Prizm and PREIT filed lawsuits challenging both zoning and stormwater runoff plans in an effort to prevent the mall's construction. They also appealed to the public to express their opposition to the new mall's construction.

Each side also accused the other of contacting retailers in an effort to either persuade them to relocate, or not to do so. Both sides denied any such activity.
