= Teedyuscung =

Native American chief

- Teedyuscung by William Bock
- Born: c. 1700; West Jersey
- Died: April, 19 1763 (aged c. 63); Wyoming Valley, Province of Pennsylvania
- Spouse: Elizabeth
- Children: Tachgokanhelle

Teedyuscung (c. 1700–1763) was a Lenape leader known as the "King of the Delawares" who worked to establish a permanent home for the Lenape in northeastern Pennsylvania. Teedyuscung was born in West Jersey but had settled near the Lehigh Gap by the early 1730s. He was baptized by Moravian missionaries in 1750, and for a few years lived at the mission settlement of Gnadenhütten on the Lehigh River. In 1754, disillusioned with the Moravians, he led a group of Lenape and Mahican to the Wyoming Valley, an area along the North Branch of the Susquehanna River. During the French and Indian War, Teedyuscung commanded a raid that destroyed three isolated farmsteads but afterwards turned to diplomacy. He represented his people during negotiations with Pennsylvania's governor, where he repeatedly claimed that the Lenape had been defrauded of their traditional territory. He advocated for the Wyoming Valley to be set aside as a Lenape homeland. At the Treaty of Easton in 1758, he was berated by the Haudenosaunee for presuming to speak for them. In late 1762, Teedyuscung warned off surveyors and laborers from the Susquehanna Company seeking to establish a settlement in the Wyoming Valley. Several months later, on April 19, 1763, he was murdered in his sleep by arsonists who set fire to his cabin.

== Early life ==
Teedyuscung, whose name means "as far as the wood's edge," was born around 1700 in West Jersey near present-day Trenton. He was raised among a group of Lenape who had become acculturated to the ways of the colonists. Teedyuscung and his family adopted European-style clothing, utilized European goods in their daily lives, and learned to speak English. The introduction of liquor by unscrupulous traders, however, deeply affected Teedyuscung for much of his life. When the Lenape were pushed out of the Trenton area around 1730, Teedyuscung migrated with his wife and children across the Delaware River and settled near the Lehigh Gap.

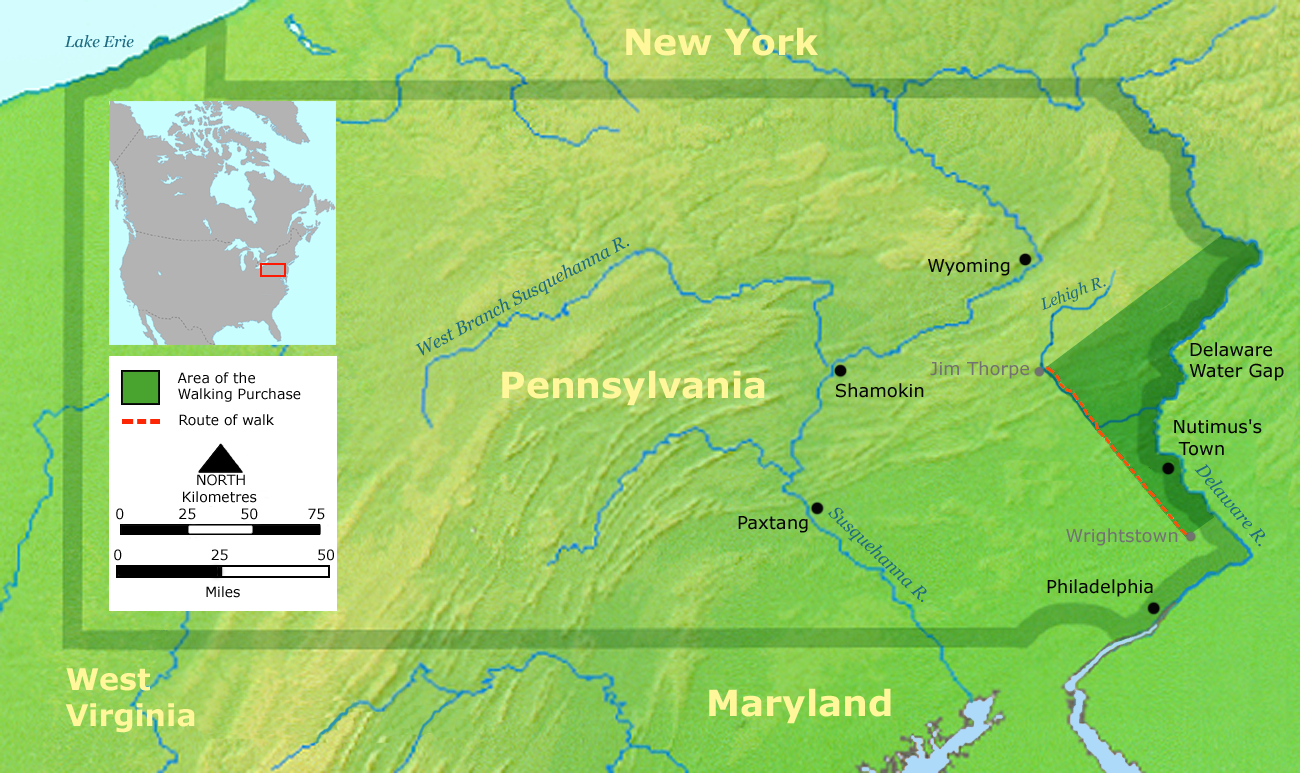
In 1737, the sons of Pennsylvania founder William Penn fraudulently acquired the shaded area known as the Walking Purchase from the Lenape

Following the fraudulent Walking Purchase of 1737, the Lenape lost around 1,200 square miles (3,100 km^{2}) of their territory between the Delaware and Lehigh rivers known as "The Forks." In 1742, the Onondaga arbitrator Canassatego ordered the Lenape at the Forks to relocate to Shamokin or the Wyoming Valley. Although many Lenape moved to the North Branch of the Susquehanna River, Teedyuscung's home lay outside the bounds of the purchase. He and his family continued living near the Lehigh Gap until 1750. That year, he moved upriver to the Moravian mission settlement of Gnadenhütten. Teedyuscung was baptized and given the name Gideon, while his wife was given the name Elizabeth. Four years later, unhappy with the mission's strict rules, Teedyuscung led a group of Lenape and Mahican away from Gnadenhütten for the Wyoming Valley. In his biography of Teedyuscung, Anthony F. C. Wallace wrote:

Teedyuscung was of two minds, as far as white people were concerned, and what satisfied one offended the other. He was driven to identify himself with the Europeans by an acute sense of his insecurity and inferiority as a member of the broken Delaware society. But this same anxious sense of shame produced a belligerent, stubborn denial of the authority of the very people he admired.

Because he could speak English, Teedyuscung became the unofficial leader and spokesperson for the Eastern Lenape who lived along the North Branch of the Susquehanna River. Colonial officials referred to him as "King of the Delawares," a title which he embraced.

== French and Indian War ==
During the French and Indian War, Teedyuscung and his people, still resentful over the loss of their traditional territory, and under pressure from the French-aligned Western Lenape living along the Allegheny River and its tributaries, took part in raids against isolated frontier farms. In December 1755, Teedyuscung led a war party that destroyed three farms, killing some of the settlers and taking others prisoner.

In the spring of 1756, Teedyuscung "put down the hatchet" and accepted an offer to meet with Pennsylvania's governor. Although he claimed to represent "ten nations" including those of the Haudenosaunee Confederacy, his actual constituency was the Lenape and Mahican from the Wyoming Valley. At a November conference in Easton, Teedyuscung explained that the Lenape had gone to war due to their lingering anger over the Walking Purchase and the sale by the Haudenosaunee of land north of the Blue Mountain (Kittatinny) ridge in 1749. He told Governor William Denny:

This very Ground that is under me (striking it with his foot) was my Land and Inheritance, and is taken from me by Fraud; when I say this Ground, I mean all the Land lying between Tohiccon Creek and Wioming, on the River Saquehannah.

Teedyuscung's claim of land fraud was encouraged by the Friendly Association for Regaining and Preserving Peace with the Indians. The Friendly Association was a Quaker organization formed by Israel Pemberton, who hoped to discredit Thomas and Richard Penn, Pennsylvania's proprietors, who had orchestrated the Walking Purchase. Denny relayed Teedyuscung's accusations to the Penns, who proposed to the Board of Trade (the British government agency responsible for the colonies) that William Johnson, Superintendent of Indian Affairs in the Northern Department, be empowered to investigate and settle the dispute. The Board of Trade endorsed this proposal and directed Johnson to proceed.

At the conference at Easton in the summer of 1757, Teedyuscung again claimed to represent 10 nations, and again challenged the legality of the purchases that had forced the Lenape out of the Delaware River watershed. During the meeting, Denny insisted that only Johnson had the authority to settle the matter. Teedyuscung, however, refused to submit the dispute to Johnson's mediation and declared that he wanted King George II to decide what action to take. Johnson consequently reported the refusal to the Board of Trade, and wrote that "he had not thought it advisable to press his Mediation upon these Indians any further."

Teedyuscung never demanded the return of the Lenape's traditional territory, but instead asked that the Wyoming Valley be set aside as permanent homeland for his people. Denny reminded him that the Wyoming Valley had not been purchased from the Haudenosaunee and that Pennsylvania could not give what the colony did not own. Despite this, peace was formalized, and arrangements were made for log cabins to be constructed in the valley for Teedyuscung's people.

Several historians reference Teedyuscung's alcoholism. Clinton Weslager, for example, author of The Delaware Indians: A History, refers to the Lenape leader's “psychopathic need for liquor.” Teedyuscung was a heavy drinker, but, until the October 1758 conference at Easton, there is little evidence that intoxication impaired his performance during negotiations. His speeches in 1756 and 1757 demonstrate a sustained engagement with the issues under discussion. Accounts of the 1758 conference, however, provide a rare instance in which his drinking interfered with the conduct of negotiations. Charles Thomson, who served as Teedyuscung's secretary, wrote that on one occasion conference, Teedyuscung came to the council “too drunk to do Business,” forcing the matter before him to be postponed. Thomson also reported that the following day, the Mohawk spokesperson Nichas, fed up with Teedyuscung's boasting and frequent interruptions, angrily berated the Lenape leader. The interpreters declined to translate what was said.

Subsequently, the representatives of the Haudenosaunee met privately with Denny and disavowed Teedyuscung's authority to speak for them. During the meeting Nichas said:

You all know, that he gives out, he is the Great Man and Chief of Ten Nations: This is his constant Discourse. Now I, on Behalf of the Mohawks, say, we do not know he is such a great Man. If he is such a great Man, we desire to know who has made him so.

Similar sentiments were expressed by the other Haudenosaunee leaders. When the conference resumed, Teedyuscung contritely listened as the minutes of the meeting with Denny were read aloud. In his reply he said:

I sit there as a Bird on a Bow; I look about, and do not know where to go; let me therefore come down upon the Ground, and make that my own by a good Deed, and I shall then have a Home for ever; for if you, my Uncles, or I die, our Brethren the English will say, they have bought it from you, and so wrong my Posterity out of it.

Meanwhile, the Pennsylvania Assembly had commissioned their representative in London, Benjamin Franklin, to petition the Privy Council directly. Franklin’s 1758 petition repeated the grievances voiced by Teedyuscung, specifically highlighting complaints about deceptive surveys (such as the Walking Purchase) and purchases made from individuals who lacked the authority to sell. The Privy Council referred the matter to the Board of Trade who instructed Johnson to reopen his investigation.

== Diplomat ==
After peace between Pennsylvania and the Eastern Lenape was established, Teedyuscung made several attempts to act as an intermediary between the Western Lenape and the Pennsylvania government. He dispatched several messengers, including his son, however, his peace overtures were snubbed due to a failure to follow protocol. Teedyuscung wanted to broker peace with the Western Lenape to bolster his reputation, but he failed to provide his messengers with wampum belts, meaning they had no formal standing. He also interfered with Governor Denny's attempts at peace. In 1757, he discouraged the government's emissary, Christian Frederick Post, from proceeding to the Ohio Country. The following year Teedyuscung again tried to stop Post from travelling west as he did not want to "share the glory of securing peace."

In 1760, Post and militia Lieutenant John Hays were asked to accompany Teedyuscung to a "great concourse in the west." They followed the Forbidden Path along the Chemung River but at the Mingo village of Conisteo (Secaughcung), they were warned not to proceed further. Hays recorded that the Mingo said "if we Came any farther they would Rost us in the fire." Post and Hays turned back but Teedyuscung was allowed to continue. While the "great concourse" on the Mahoning River achieved little, Teedyuscung was an observer at the conference at Fort Pitt in August that resulted in a formal peace agreement between the British and the Indigenous nations of the Ohio Country.

In March 1760, Johnson had invited Teedyuscung to meet but the Lenape leader declined as he was about to leave for the west. It wasn't until June 1762 that the two met. Teedyuscung still insisted that the Lenape had been cheated by the Walking Purchase, but if the governor would not help the "true owners" then he would leave it to God to make judgment. The Lenape leader stated that he would "bury under Ground all Controversies about Land" and signed a release for the disputed lands. Johnson reported to the Board of Trade that the issue had been resolved.

== Death ==
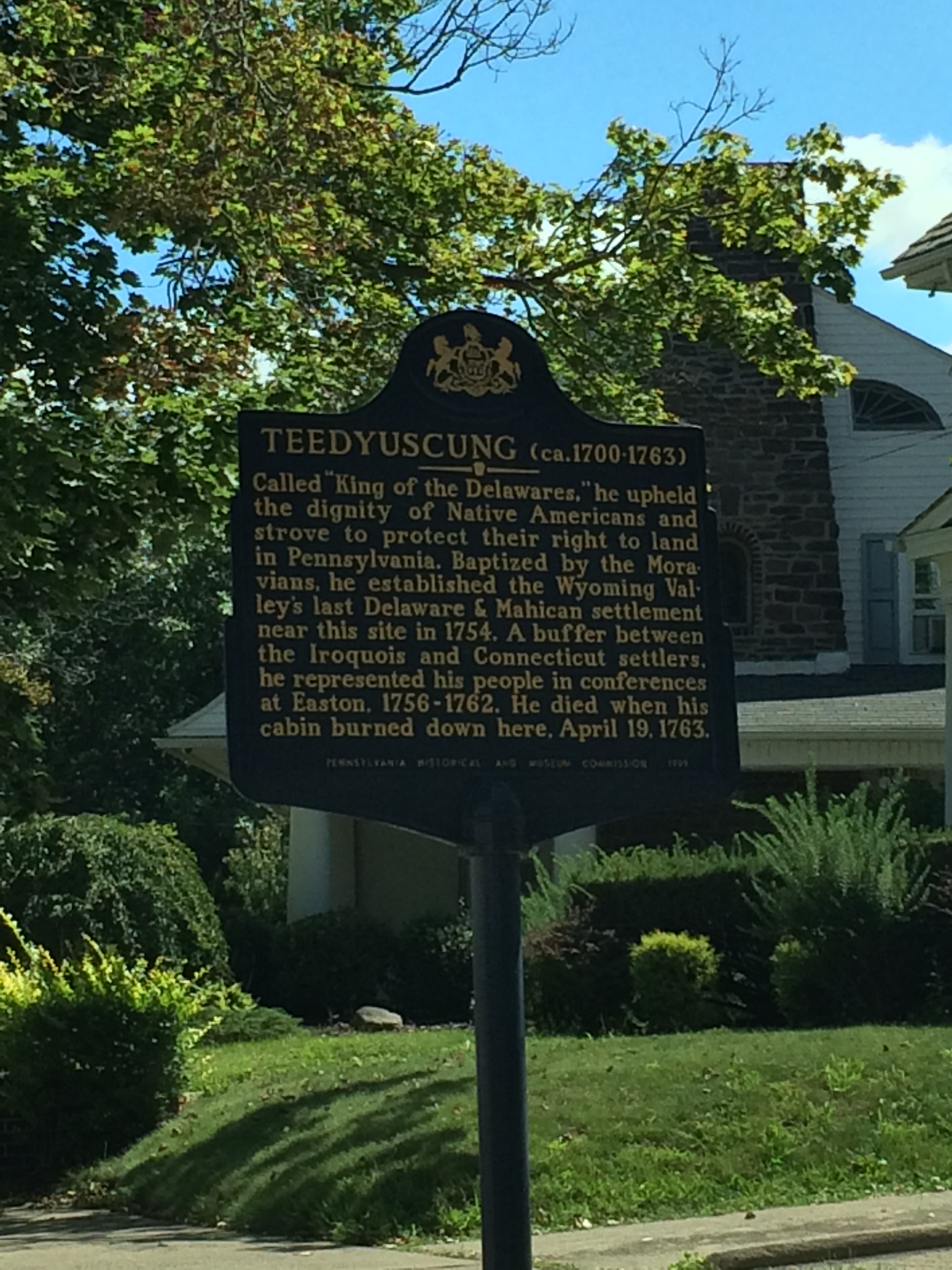
A plaque in Wilkes-Barre, Pennsylvania marks the approximate location of Teedyuscung’s death

Overlapping royal charters granted in the 17th century had given both Pennsylvania and Connecticut a claim to the Wyoming Valley. In 1754, during the Albany Congress, Connecticut's Susquehanna Company fraudulently secured a deed to the valley from a handful of Haudesonaunee delegates who had no authority to sell. The Haudenosaunee Grand Council repudiated the sale and asserted its authority over the region, but the Susquehanna Company ignored the Council's protest and insisted that the transaction was valid.

The French and Indian War delayed colonization plans, but in 1762, the Susquehanna Company sent an advance party of surveyors and laborers to the valley. They were warned off by Teedyuscung, who afterwards protested the incursion to Pennsylvania's governor. On April 19, 1763, Teedyuscung was killed when arsonists set his cabin on fire while he slept. Twenty other cabins were torched, forcing the Lenape survivors to flee. Pennsylvania officials blamed the Haudenosaunee, however, a large contingent of settlers from Connecticut arrived two weeks later. Six months later, the Lenape, led by Teedyuscung's son, Tachgokanhelle, attacked the settlement in what is known as the Mill Creek Massacre. At least 10 colonists were killed, a number were taken captive, and the rest fled back east. It is unclear whether this was an act of vengeance for Teedyuscung's murder or a part of Pontiac's War.

== Legacy ==
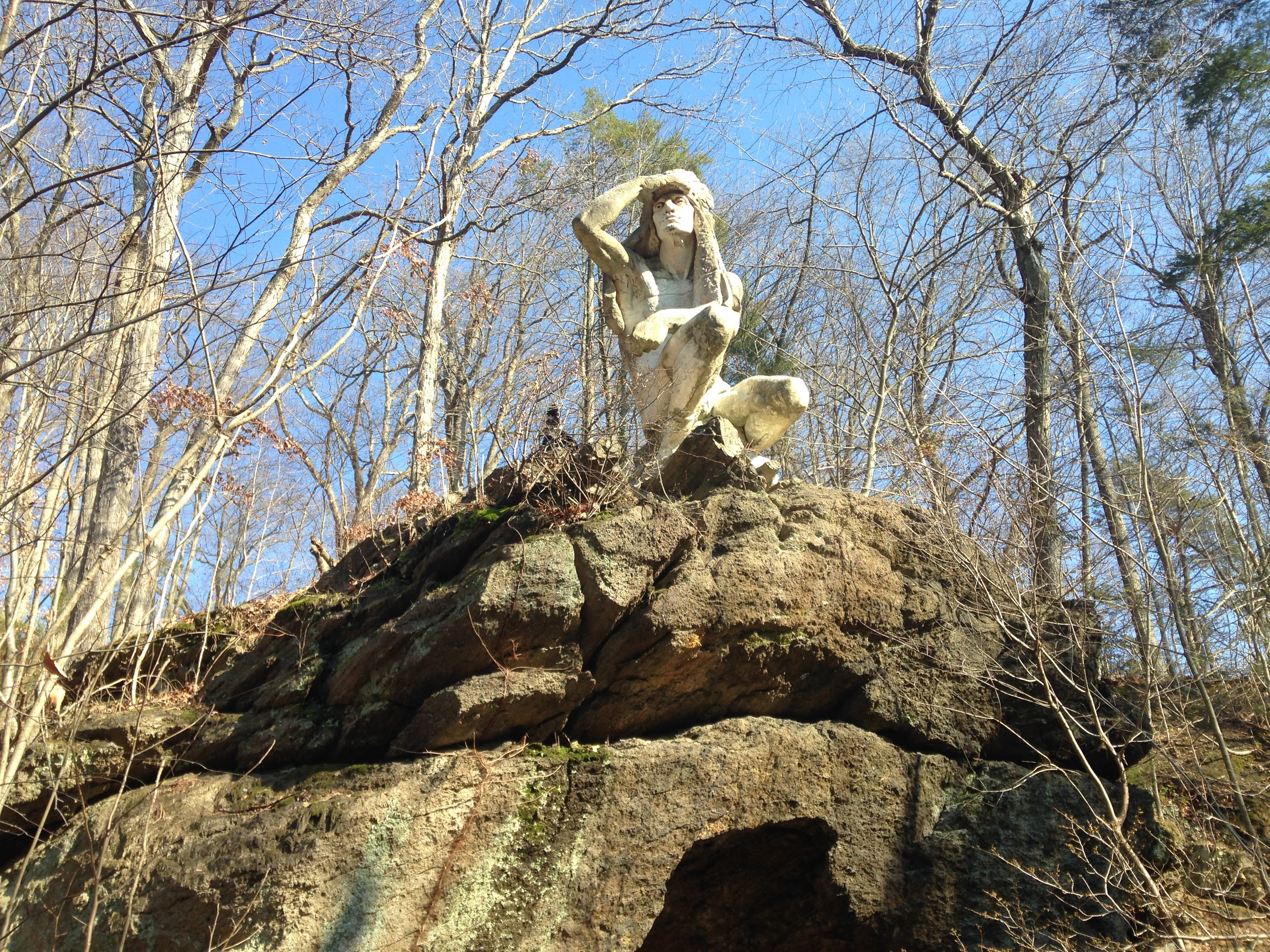
A statue by John Rhind, purported to be of Teedyuscung, in Philadelphia's Wissahickon Valley Park

A historical marker, located on Pennsylvania Route 92, marks the location of Wyolutimunk, a Lenape hamlet where Teedyuscung, Post and Hays encamped on May 17, 1760 while on their way to the "great concourse in the West." A marker in Wilkes-Barre, Pennsylvania was erected in 2005 to commemorate Teedyuscung's efforts to "uphold the dignity of Native Americans" and protect their right to land.

According to local folklore, a marble statue in Philadelphia's Wissahickon Valley Park depicts Teedyuscung. The statue is perched halfway up a cliff on a rocky protrusion known as Council Rock and was carved by noted Scottish-American sculptor John Massey Rhind. It depicts a minimally clothed Indigenous male wearing a war bonnet — an ornate headdress never worn by the Lenape. Neither Rhind, nor Charles W. Henry who commissioned the 1902 work, intended it to represent Teedyuscung. It was instead meant as a tribute to local Indigenous history. The statue replaced an earlier painted board sculpture erected in 1856 by local landowner Joseph Middleton who had embraced the folklore that the site was the location of Lenape councils attended by Teedyuscung. There is no documentary evidence, however, that suggests the Lenape leader ever visited the Wissahickon Valley.
