= Moosic, Pennsylvania =

Borough in Pennsylvania, US

- Borough
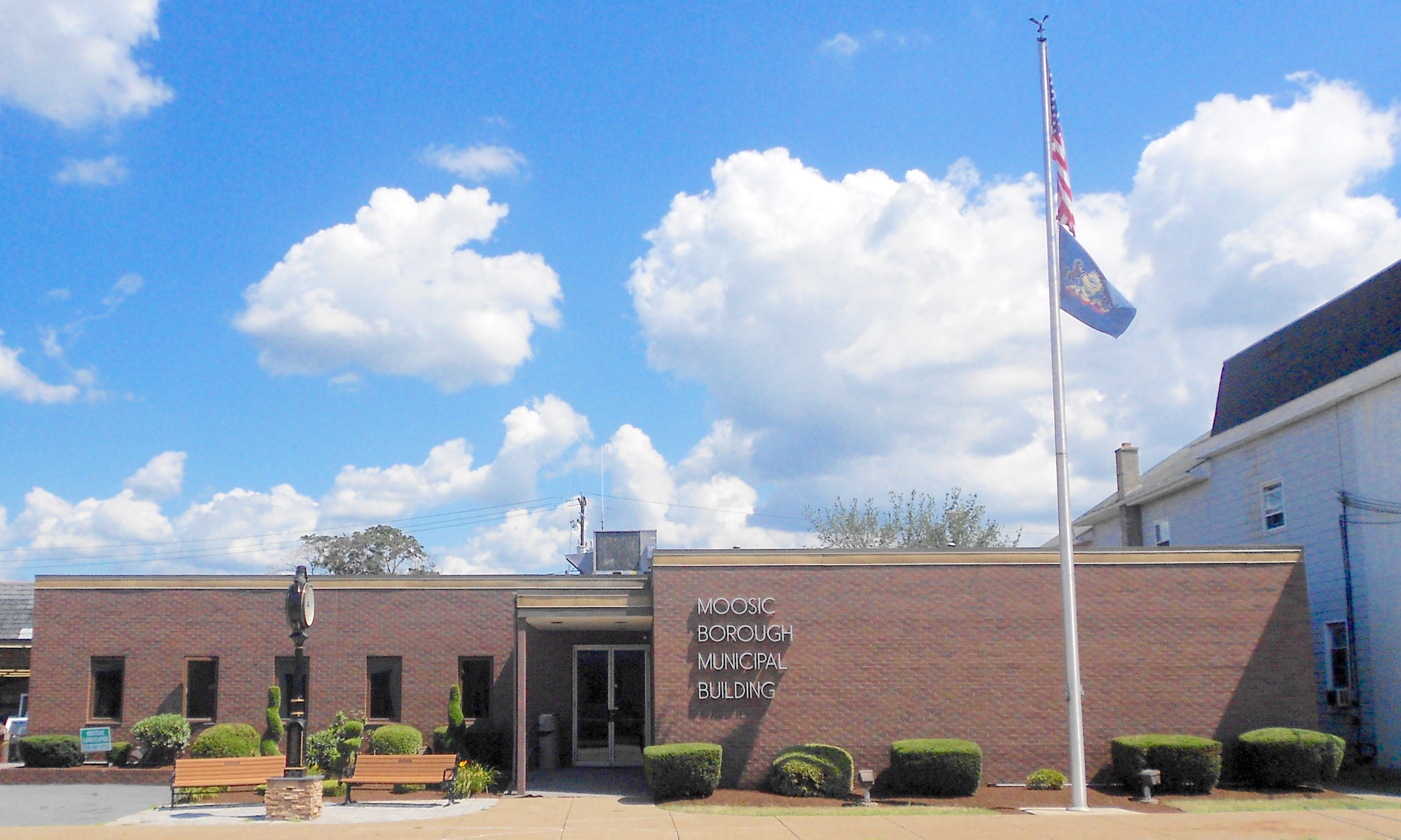
- Municipal building

- Location of Moosic in Lackawanna County, Pennsylvania

- Location in Pennsylvania Location in the United States
- Coordinates: 41°22′06″N 75°42′23″W
- Country: United States
- State: Pennsylvania
- County: Lackawanna
- Incorporated: 1898

Government
  - Mayor: Robert Bennie

Area
  - Total: 6.53 sq mi (16.91 km^{2})
  - Land: 6.48 sq mi (16.78 km^{2})
  - Water: 0.050 sq mi (0.13 km^{2})
- Elevation: 817 ft (249 m)

Population (2020)
  - Total: 5,959
  - Density: 919.5/sq mi (355.03/km^{2})
- Time zone: UTC-5 (Eastern Standard Time)
  - Summer (DST): UTC-4 (Eastern Daylight Time)
- Zip Code: 18507
- Area codes: 570
- FIPS code: 42-50880
- GNIS feature ID: 1215324
- Website: moosicborough.com

Moosic (/ˈmuːzɪk/ MOO-zik) is a borough in Lackawanna County, Pennsylvania, United States, 3 miles (5 km) south of downtown Scranton and 10 miles (16 km) northeast of downtown Wilkes-Barre, on the Lackawanna River.

Moosic is in a former coal-mining region. A few older industries existed at one time, including the manufacturing of canvas gloves and silk products. The population was 5,972 at the 2020 census.

== History ==
The name "Moosic" probably derives from the Unami language of the Lenape people, meaning "elk place". The Lenape, a Native American people, are the earliest-known inhabitants of Moosic. The borough was incorporated on December 9, 1898. Before incorporation, the villages of Moosic and Greenwood had been a part of Lackawanna Township. From 1886 to 1987, Moosic was the site of Rocky Glen Park, an amusement park. The former grounds are now a Pennsylvania state historical marker.

== Geography ==
Moosic is located in the Wyoming Valley of northeastern Pennsylvania. In terms of physiography, Moosic is part of the Ridge and Valley province of the Appalachian Mountains. Moosic is located at an elevation of 817 feet (249 m) above sea level. The major body of water flowing through the borough is the Lackawanna River, part of the Upper Susquehanna-Lackawanna Watershed. Moosic has a total area of 6.6 square miles (17 km^{2}), of which 6.5 square miles (17 km^{2}) is land and 0.1 square miles (0.26 km^{2}) (1.52%) is water. Moosic has a humid continental climate (Köppen Dfa) with four distinct seasons. Summers are humid and warm, with an occasional heatwave. Winters are cold and snowy.

== Culture and contemporary life ==
Recent developments in Moosic have created a restaurant, retail, and entertainment scene, including a multiplex movie theater, along with several restaurants and hotels. In 2005, a plan to build a large outdoor shopping mall near the theater was announced. The Shoppes at Montage were completed in 2007, consisting of an open-air, outdoor plaza housing over forty stores and restaurants.

The Scranton/Wilkes-Barre Highlanders are a Triple-A Minor League Baseball team in Moosic. They are a farm team of the New York Yankees and play at PNC Field.

Other sites in the borough include the Lackawanna County Visitors Center, a Boy Scouts center, and the Glenmaura complex of upscale houses. Glenmaura National Golf Club is recognized as a PGA tournament course and identified by a major U.S. golf magazine as one of the top 100 courses in the nation.

Directly to the north of the borough is the Toyota Pavilion and Montage Mountain Ski Area, and directly south is Wilkes-Barre/Scranton International Airport, located in the adjacent borough of Avoca. In 2008, a water park was built on the grounds of Montage Mountain ski resort. Known as Montage Meltdown, the park was completed in June 2009.

The major daily newspaper in Moosic is The Times-Tribune of Scranton. The main television studios of WNEP-TV, the local ABC-TV affiliate, are located in Moosic.

Vehicle traffic is the major mode of transport. Walk Score rated Moosic as car-dependent, as "few amenities are within walking distance." Public transportation is provided by the County of Lackawanna Transit System (COLTS). Baseball fans can take a trolley from the Electric City Trolley Museum at the Steamtown National Historic Site in Scranton to a station next to PNC Field.

== Demographics ==
Historical population
| Census | Pop. | Note | %± |
|---|---|---|---|
| 1880 | 600 | | — |
| 1900 | 1,227 | | — |
| 1910 | 3,964 | | 223.1% |
| 1920 | 4,364 | | 10.1% |
| 1930 | 4,557 | | 4.4% |
| 1940 | 4,568 | | 0.2% |
| 1950 | 3,965 | | −13.2% |
| 1960 | 4,243 | | 7.0% |
| 1970 | 4,646 | | 9.5% |
| 1980 | 6,068 | | 30.6% |
| 1990 | 5,339 | | −12.0% |
| 2000 | 5,575 | | 4.4% |
| 2010 | 5,719 | | 2.6% |
| 2020 | 5,959 | | 4.2% |
| 2021 (est.) | 5,976 | ▲ | 0.3% |

As of the census of 2010, there were 5,719 people, 2,363 households, and 1,596 families residing in the borough. The population density was 879.8 inhabitants per square mile (339.7/km^{2}). There were 2,500 housing units at an average density of 384.6 per square mile (148.5/km^{2}). The racial makeup of the borough was 95.3% White, 1% African American, 0.1% American Indian, 1.8% Asian, 1.1% from other races, and 0.6% from two or more races. Hispanic or Latino of any race were 3.7% of the population.

There were 2,363 households, out of which 24.1% had children under the age of 18 living with them, 50.7% were married couples living together, 11.8% had a female householder with no husband present, and 32.5% were non-families. 28.7% of all households were made up of individuals, and 12.5% had someone living alone who was 65 years of age or older. The average household size was 2.41 and the average family size was 2.98.

In the borough the population was spread out, with 19.6% under the age of 18, 61.6% from 18 to 64, and 18.8% who were 65 years of age or older. The median age was 44.4 years.

The median income for a household in the borough was $38,987, and the median income for a family was $47,703. Males had a median income of $35,878 versus $22,261 for females. The per capita income for the borough was $21,178. About 4.3% of families and 8.1% of the population were below the poverty line, including 15.0% of those under age 18 and 6.1% of those age 65 or over.

| Demographic profile | 2010 | 2000 |
|---|---|---|
| One race | 99.4% | 99.7% |
| White | 95.3% | 98.7% |
| Asian | 1.8% | 0.5% |
| Black or African American | 1.0% | 0.3% |
| American Indian and Alaska Native | 0.1% | 0.0% |
| Native Hawaiian and Other Pacific Islander | 0.0% | 0.0% |
| Some other race | 1.1% | 0.3% |
| Two or more races | 0.6% | 0.3% |
| Hispanic or Latino (of any race) | 3.7% | 0.5% |
| White alone | 92.8% | 98.4% |

== Industry ==
Moosic, Pennsylvania, has transitioned from a coal and textile-based economy to a hub for light manufacturing, healthcare, logistics, and retail. Its location along the I-81 corridor and near the Pennsylvania Turnpike (I-476) has made it a favorable site for regional warehousing and distribution.

Signature Building Systems, Inc. opened its headquarters and manufacturing operations in Moosic in 2001. Signature is a modular manufacturer of single-family and multifamily homes. It produces custom modular buildings for residential and commercial use throughout the East Coast, serving markets from North Carolina to Maine.

Albright Precision, Inc., established in 1997, operates a precision metal fabrication facility in Moosic. The company serves industries such as lighting, medical, defense, and construction, offering design, manufacturing, finishing, and assembly services.

Bazooka Brands, the maker of Ring Pop candy, opened a new 120,000-square-foot facility in Moosic in 2024. The factory replaced an older site in Scranton and is capable of producing up to 1.5 million Ring Pops daily.

Galaxy Manufacturing Company Inc. specializes in the production of industrial power brushes and private label products. The company is located at 500 Gleason Drive in Moosic.

== Education ==
Riverside School District serves residents of Moosic and neighboring Taylor. Moosic has two elementary schools, Riverside Elementary East and Riverside Elementary West which serves both Moosic residents and Taylor residents. Riverside Elementary West serves for Kindergarten,1st, and 2nd grade. Riverside Elementary East serves for 3rd, 4th, 5th, and 6th grade. High school students attend Riverside Jr.-Sr. High school for grades 7-12, which is located across the Lackawanna River in Taylor. Riverside is known for its high school football rivalry with neighboring Old Forge. The two schools are "archrivals", who have "arguably the most fierce rivalry in the Lackawanna Football Conference." Old Forge leads head-to-head with a record of 32-30-4.

== Notable people ==
- Matthew Cartwright, member of the U.S. House of Representatives, Pennsylvania's 8th district
- John L. Gronski, US Army major general
- Joe Grzenda, eight-year Major League Baseball relief pitcher
- Frank Serafini, former member of the PA House of Representatives, from the 114th District

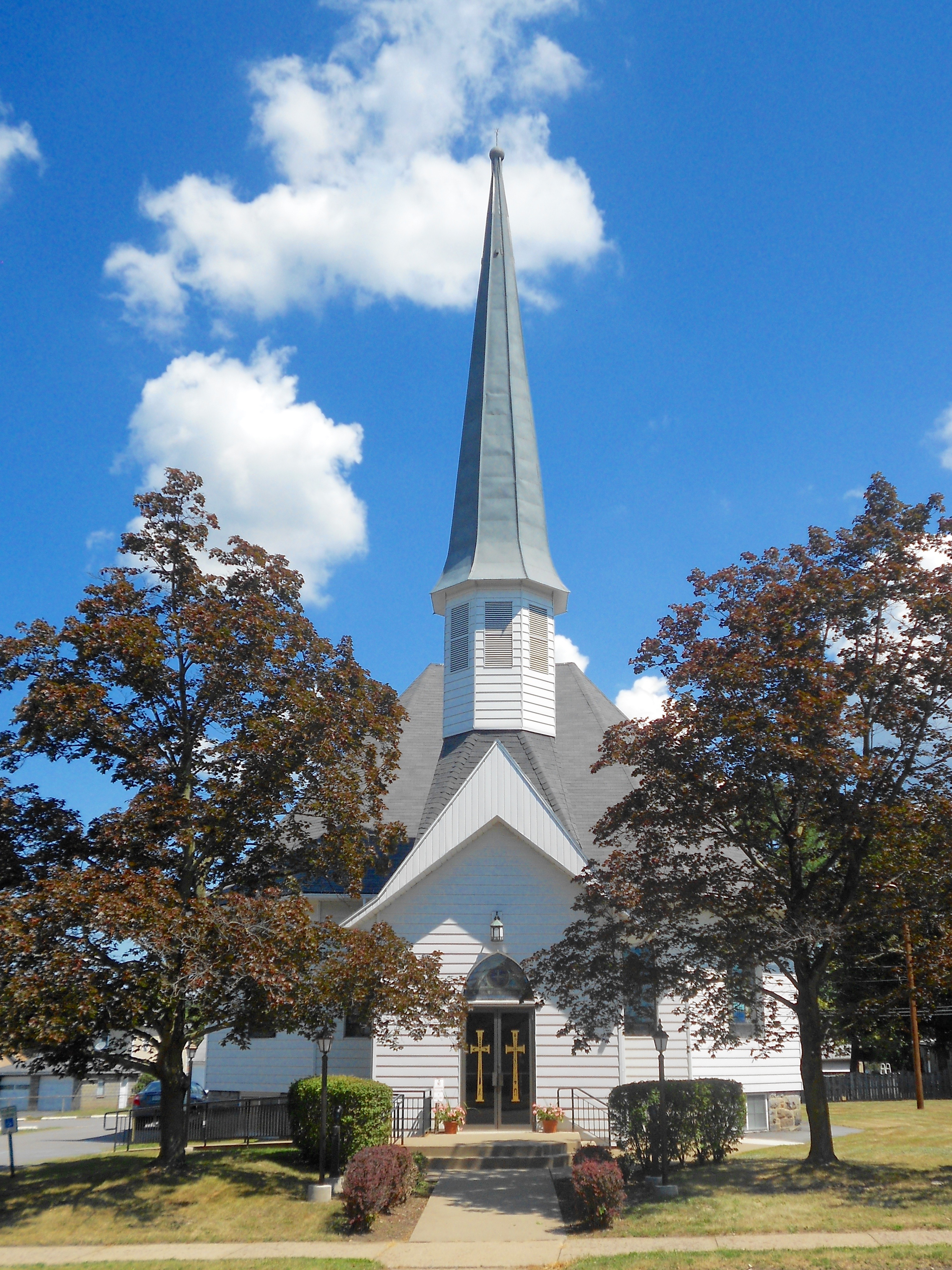
Moosic Presbyterian Church in 2015

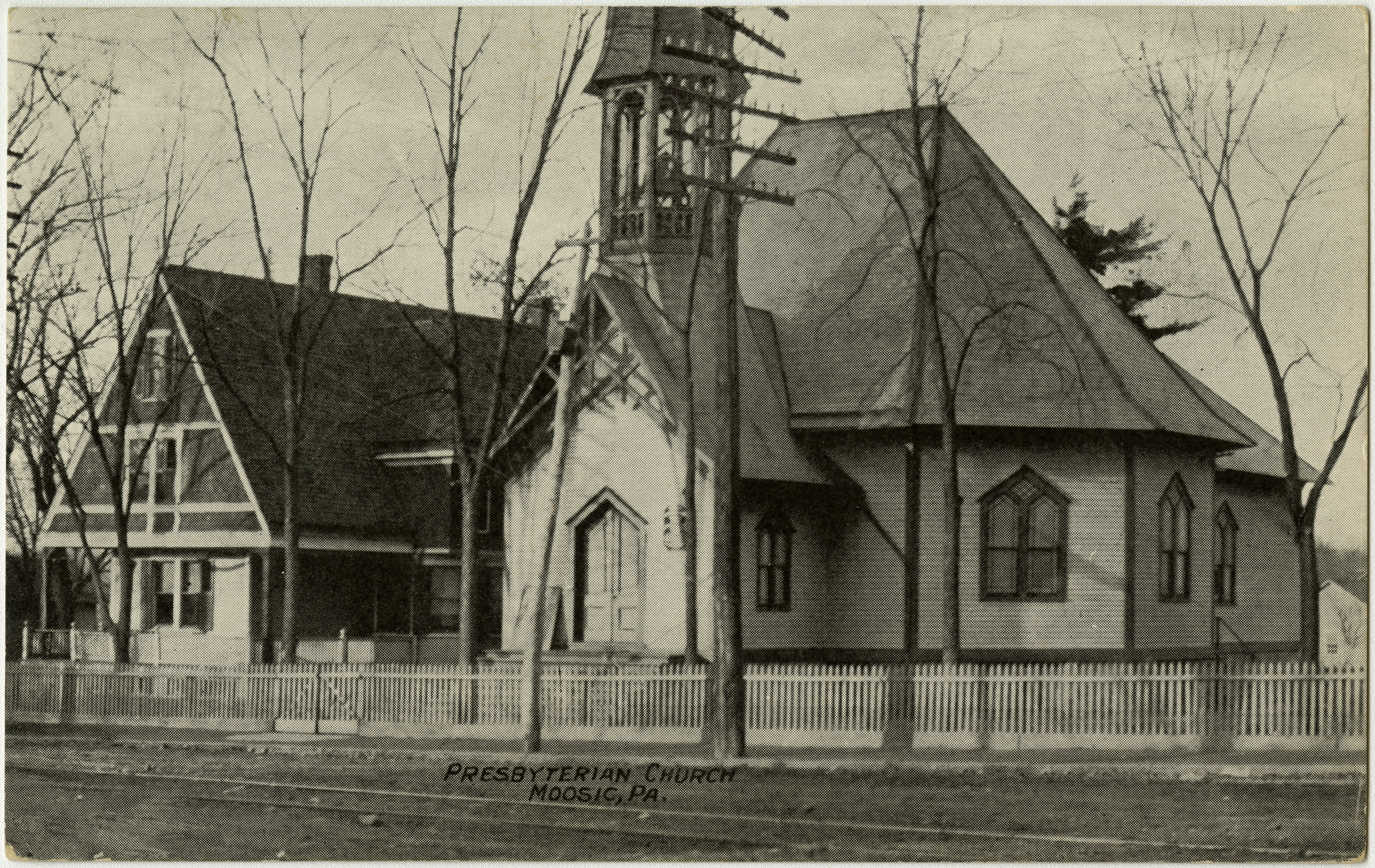
Presbyterian church on an old postcard

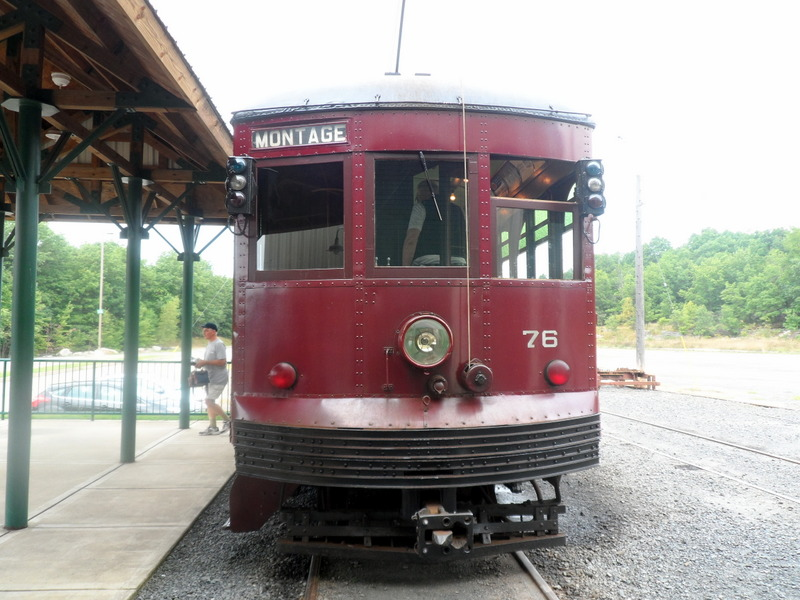
Moosic Trolley Works
