= The Marketplace at Steamtown =

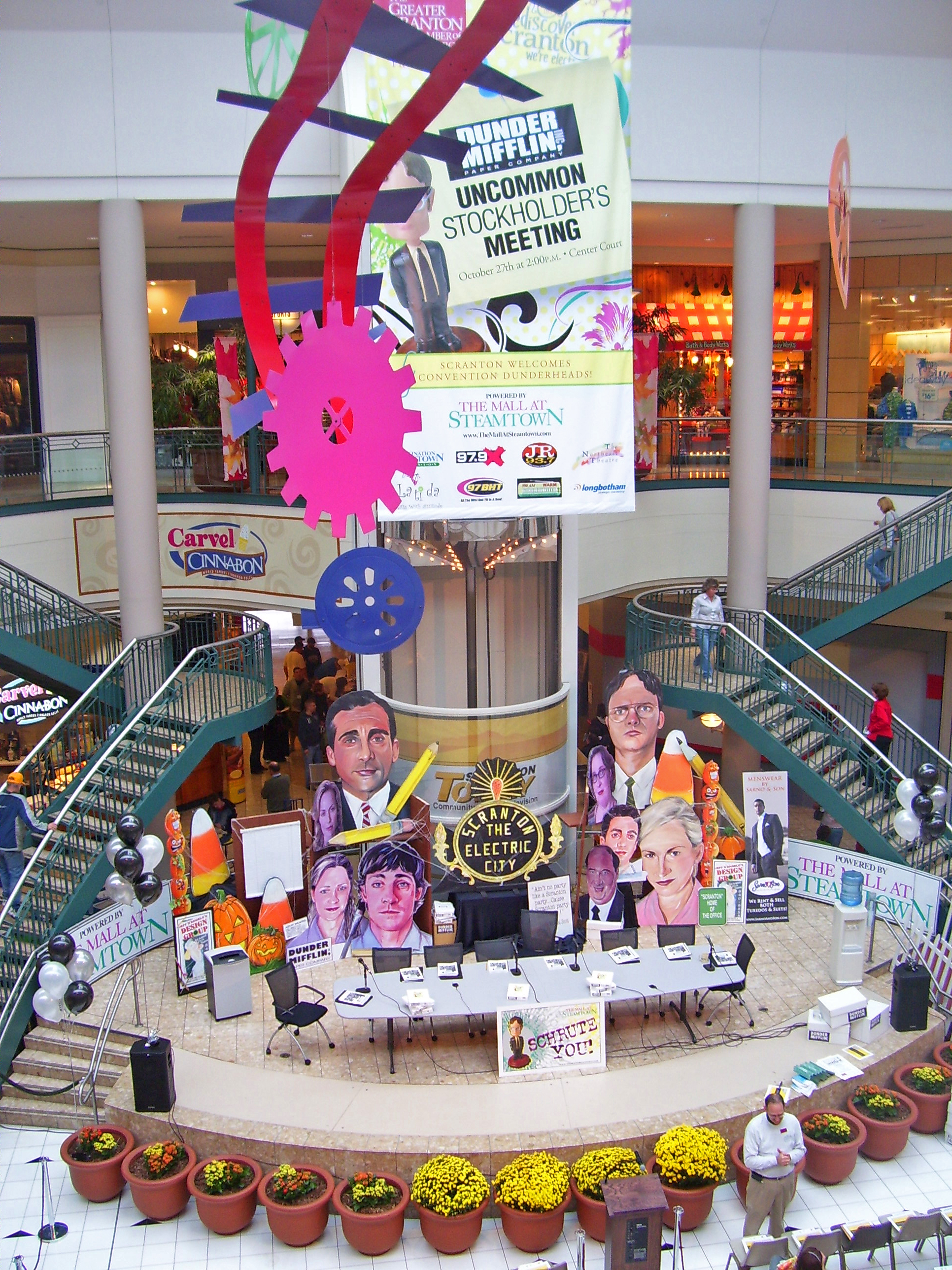
- Mall atrium during The Office convention featuring Carvel, Cinnabon, and Bath and Body Works, October 2007
- Location: Scranton, PA, United States
- Coordinates: 41°24′30″N 75°40′05″W
- Address: 300 Lackawanna Avenue Scranton, Pennsylvania 18503
- Opened: Halloween weekend 1993
- Developer: Scranton Mall Associates
- Manager: Zamias Services, Inc.
- Owner: Steamtown 300 LLC
- Num. of stores: 49 (2026) (70 at peak)
- Num. of anchor tenants: 1 (3 at Peak, Boscov's, Montgomery Ward, The Globe Store)
- Floor area: 555,815–563,774 square feet (51,636.9–52,376.3 m^{2})
- Floors: 2
- Parking: 2,441 spaces
- Public transit: COLTS bus: 12, 13, 14, 18, 21, 25, 26, 28, 29, 31, 34, 35, 36, 37, 38, 41, 42, 43, 45, 48, 52, 53, 54, 71, 72, 73, 96, 99
- Website: The Marketplace at Steamtown

The Marketplace at Steamtown (formerly The Mall at Steamtown) is a shopping mall in Scranton, Pennsylvania. United States. It was conceived in the mid-1980s as the keystone of downtown revitalization, though the project was not completed until 1993. Its opening in 1993 was nationally televised on CNN and attended by then-Pennsylvania Governor Robert P. Casey, Sr., who was instrumental in securing funding for and initiating development of the mall. The mall is built on approximately half of the former Delaware, Lackawanna and Western Railroad yard that was abandoned by Conrail in the late 1970s. The mall is located on Lackawanna Avenue in the heart of downtown Scranton, and includes a parking garage that stretches the length of the mall between Boscov's and Delta Medix, aka the former The Bon-Ton and Montgomery Ward. The mall has two levels with a food court overlooking Steamtown National Historic Site on the second floor. There is a pedestrian bridge leading from the food court out to Steamtown. The mall was featured several times on the NBC sitcom The Office which was set in Scranton.

== History ==
The Mall at Steamtown project was organized by Al Boscov, due to Boscov's being unable to move into Crown American malls after they bought Hess's. Boscov’s Department Stores and Shopco Advisory Corp developed the mall under the name Scranton Mall Associates. The mall cost $90 million to construct and required the demolition of many buildings which was completed with the implosion of five buildings on April 5, 1992. Prior to the construction, the area had problems with drugs and prostitution.

=== 2000s ===
The Bon-Ton moved to the mall in 2000 from its location at the Keyser Oak Shopping Center. In 2003, Steamtown Mall Partners replaced Scranton Mall Associates as the manager of the mall. The mall's owners fought the construction of The Shoppes at Montage and lost in court.

=== 2010s ===
The Bon-Ton closed after the lease expired on January 31, 2014, after 13 years in the mall. They had also leased an additional 10,000 square feet (930 m^{2}) over two stores on the mall's first floor. American Eagle Outfitters and ATOS Chicken & Waffles also closed. A replacement store had shown interest, but was delayed due to the foreclosure. No new anchor was in negotiations to replace The Bon-Ton according to Al Boscov. After the foreclosure announcement, As Seen on TV, Cinnabon/Carvel, and Steamtown Pub and Grill also closed. After the sheriff's sale, Express closed in August 2014. Jones Lang LaSalle managed the mall from 2012 until 2014. Part of the parking deck near the former Bon-Ton store had to be closed in 2014 due to degradation. Overall parking was not affected due to the parking garage underneath the mall and the parking deck near Boscov's. Repairs for the parking garages were estimated at $10 million. The Steamtown 8 Cinemas (Marquee Cinemas) did not generate enough revenue to afford the conversion to digital projectors. Operator Marquee did not renew its lease at the end of 2014. Abercrombie & Fitch and Hollister closed in December 2014. Due to the foreclosure and sheriff's sale, The Mall at Steamtown's vacancy is at 75%. Lids and Nathan's Hot Dogs closed in January 2015. The mall considered ending the parking program in January 2015, but kept it active. The Bodywork Store (which reincarnated into Chi Body later on] and f.y.e. closed in May 2015. According to Al Boscov, many stores left under the terms of their lease due to the mall only having one remaining anchor store.

=== Foreclosure ===
A $40.5-million mortgage came due on July 11, 2013. The owners were not able to make the payment, and the mall went into foreclosure on March 7, 2014. The Marquee Theater was included in the foreclosure, but not the Oppenheim and Samter buildings. Debt and low rent revenue (at the time of the foreclosure, the mall was only 65 percent occupied), along with competition from The Shoppes at Montage, Viewmont Mall, and online businesses were cited as reasons for the foreclosure. Boscov's department store, whose owner, Al Boscov, was a member of Steamtown Mall Partners, planned to bid for the mall at the auction or purchase it beforehand, but could not reach an agreement. Out of 43 Boscov's locations, the location at Steamtown was the 5th-best performing with annual sales of $31 million. Boscov expressed hope that other mall groups would bid on the mall as they have more resources to fill it. Boscov's continued to renovate its store during the foreclosure.

The city of Scranton owes more than $3.6 million in loans that it secured for the mall. Due to a missed payment, $613,000 has been withheld from Scranton by the United States Department of Housing and Urban Development. Due to accounting issues at the Office of Economic and Community Development in Scranton, $998,000 in payments on the Section 108 loan made from 1999 to 2001 by the mall's owners at the time (Scranton Mall Associates) were not recorded properly. The city of Scranton refinanced the remaining $1,865,000 HUD Section 108 loan in late 2014 and it will be paid over 10 years. Al Boscov donated $715,173 ($612,480 for loan principal and $102,693 in interest) from Boscov’s Department Stores to Scranton for the missed HUD loan. The money was later added to the cities funds for rebuilding sidewalk curbs.

=== Sheriff’s sale ===
The sheriff's sale was held on July 15, 2014, with a requested price of over $43.7 million. The reserve price of $37.3 million ($37,265,000) was not met and LNR Partners purchased the property for $1,567.71, its costs and taxes. The only other bidder was a representative for Robert Bolus, whose bid was declared illegal due to the contingency of a casino license being approved for the property. Al Boscov did not bid due to the high requested price and plans to continue negotiations with LNR Partners, but estimates it could take $10–20 million in investments to modernize the Mall. Zamias Services, Inc. took over management of the mall after the sheriff's sale.

=== 2015 auction ===
LNR Partners was to put The Mall at Steamtown up for auction on auction.com from June 1–3, 2015 with a starting price of $1 million. The auction was delayed until June 22–24, 2015 with a lowered starting price of $700,000 to allow for more bids. Concerns about the mall include deferred repairs and parking garage repairs. Boscov's was planning to bid on the mall but also holds veto power in its lease on any major changes. Their lease runs through 2024 and Al Boscov was against converting the mall to a farmers' market and other ideas proposed. The Mall at Steamtown reconstruction (including parking garage) was estimated to cost $33.3 million with money coming from state grants and loans backed by Scranton. Mayor Bill Courtright initially supported the plan, but later came out against it until repayment of $18 million in loans owed to Scranton is complete.

The winning bid for The Mall at Steamtown was $5.25 million, with the auction ending a half-hour late due to bidding, and Boscov’s not the buyer. Announcing who won happened four weeks later due to finalizing of the complex deal. The mall was purchased by John Basalyga for $5,512,500 (total with five percent buyer's premium) from LBUBS 2003-C5 Lackawanna Retail Partnership and operates it under the name Steamtown 300 LLC. The First National Community Bank of Dunmore financed the purchase with a mortgage of $4.2 million. Basalyga has commented that the mall will not be re-purposed at this time.

=== 2016 rebranding ===
In May 2016, Basalyga announced that the mall would be renamed "The Marketplace at Steamtown". Along with the rebranding, Basalyga announced that one of the former anchor stores would be converted to a Luzerne County Community College satellite campus, and that a movie theatre, a large indoor playground, and a space for local vendors were all expected to open during the summer. The Marketplace remains active, with new stores and businesses joining the retailer. Places of interest include Delta Medix, Luzerne County Community College, and Crunch Fitness. An area for local vendors, the Scranton Public Market, opened in late 2017. The public market features eateries and craft sellers from throughout the region. The only original stores left are Boscov's, , Auntie Anne's, and Field Goal Sports.
