= Tachgokanhelle =

Lenape leader

Personal details
- Parent: Teedyuscung
- Known for: Pontiac's War
- Nickname: Captain Bull

Tachgokanhelle, often known as Captain Bull, was a son of the Lenape chief Teedyuscung.

== Biography ==
As with his father, Bull took an active role in fighting during Pontiac's Rebellion, continuing following Teedyuscung's death. Bull and his men were responsible for a number of frontier raids in the late Summer of 1763 through into the Winter, targeting the Wyoming Valley. His encampment along the Susquehanna River was discovered on the evening of 26 February 1764 and, under orders from Sir William Johnson, was surrounded in the morning by an allied Indian party. Bull was among forty-one prisoners taken, and was taken as a prisoner-of-war to New York where he remained for the rest of the conflict. In September 1764 a number of civilian hostages taken the previous year were released to Johnson.

Bull was released in 1768 on condition of exile, and settled on the Virginia frontiers. In the following decade, Virginia became the site of intensifying frontier conflict between settlers and Shawnee raiding parties. Following a raid in 1772, Bull was falsely implicated and his village razed in retaliation.

Bull belonged to the Moravian Church.
