= Wyoming Valley Mall =

- Location: Wilkes-Barre Township, Pennsylvania, United States
- Coordinates: 41.247267°N 75.844578°W
- Address: 29 Wyoming Valley Mall
- Opened: 1971
- Developer: Crown Construction Company
- Owner: Wyoming Valley Realty Holding LLC (4th Dimension Properties)
- Num. of stores: 70
- Num. of anchor tenants: 4
- Floor area: 910,000 square feet (85,000 m^{2})
- Public transit: LCTA bus routes 10, 17, 18 Hazleton Public Transit route 15
- Website: shopwyomingvalleymall.com

Wyoming Valley Mall is a shopping mall located in Wilkes-Barre Township, Pennsylvania. It is anchored by JCPenney.

== History ==
Work began on the mall in April 1968, when land was purchased from the Blue Coal Corporation. Illegally dumped garbage from the East Side Landfill Authority was removed during early work. Sears opened before the mall in early 1971. Pomeroy's opened in August and JCPenney in April 1972. Wyoming Valley Mall did not become successful until Hurricane Agnes in 1972 caused significant damage to the surrounding area and the post-disaster need for supplies. Multiple movie theaters have existed at the mall, opening in 1972 with two screens inside, and later adding another three outside in 1977. Zollinger closed in October 1977, with Hess's opening in May 1978. The store was expanded during Hess's tenure, before it was sold by Crown American to Kaufmann's in 1994. The mall became fully owned by Crown American Realty Trust during this period, after being co-owned by one the company’s affiliates, Crown American Associates, and First Union Trust. Hess's closed for the conversion to Kaufmann's in November 1994. McCrory's closed in January 1995 during the company's bankruptcy, after the store's lease was purchased by Crown American in November 1994, with its space later becoming part of Kaufmann’s. Kaufmann's opened in October 1995.

The General Cinema theaters closed in October 2000. The mall's four screen theater was reopened as Wyoming Valley Theater by Entertainment Film Works in May 2001, but closed again in April 2002 due to unpaid rent. Wyoming Valley Mall, along with the Viewmont Mall, was sold by Crown American to PREIT in 2003. Wyoming Valley Mall was renovated in 2006 for $8 million, and received significant cosmetic changes. H&M opened at the mall in September 2017, occupying three storefronts. In April 2018, The Bon-Ton and Sears both announced they would close. Wyoming Valley Mall was undamaged during the June 2018 EF2 tornado, but lost power and was closed for a day. Bon-Ton, open since 1971 (originally as Pomeroy's), closed on August 29, 2018. Ken Pollock Auto Group opened a service center in February 2019 using the former Sears Auto Center.

Wyoming Valley Mall was turned over to its lender, GS Mortgage Securities Trust, by PREIT in late September 2019 after not being sold. PREIT owed $72.8 million on the loan, which had been in special servicing since July 2018. Wyoming Valley Mall had lost 75% of its 2014 $122 million value before being turned over. Jones Lang LaSalle took over management of the mall in October 2019. Wyoming Valley Mall was sold to the Kohan Retail Investment Group for $17 million in August 2021. 4th Dimension Properties bought the mall in October 2023.

After significant negotiations between several parties, the real estate taxes of Wyoming Valley Mall were lowered in June 2024 from $68.7 million to $13.6 million. This was due to a significant reduction in the value of the property. In July 2024, a gas explosion occurred at the future K Pot Korean BBQ and Hot Pot restaurant that injured two people and caused the mall to be evacuated. MotorWorld in December 2024 received several zoning variances from Wilkes-Barre Township for a possible large auto dealership on part of the Wyoming Valley Mall property. The project would include parts of the former Bon-Ton, former Sears, Ken Pollock Auto Center, and Macy's Home and Men's store.

In January 2025, it was announced that Macy's would be closing at the mall. The mall was closed from June 25-July 7, 2025 due to having no power. This was due to damaged electrical transmission lines that required replacement. Power was again lost from December 23-29, 2025.

== Notoriety ==
The mall sits on land that was involved in the 1919 Baltimore Mine Tunnel Disaster.
