= Viewmont Mall =

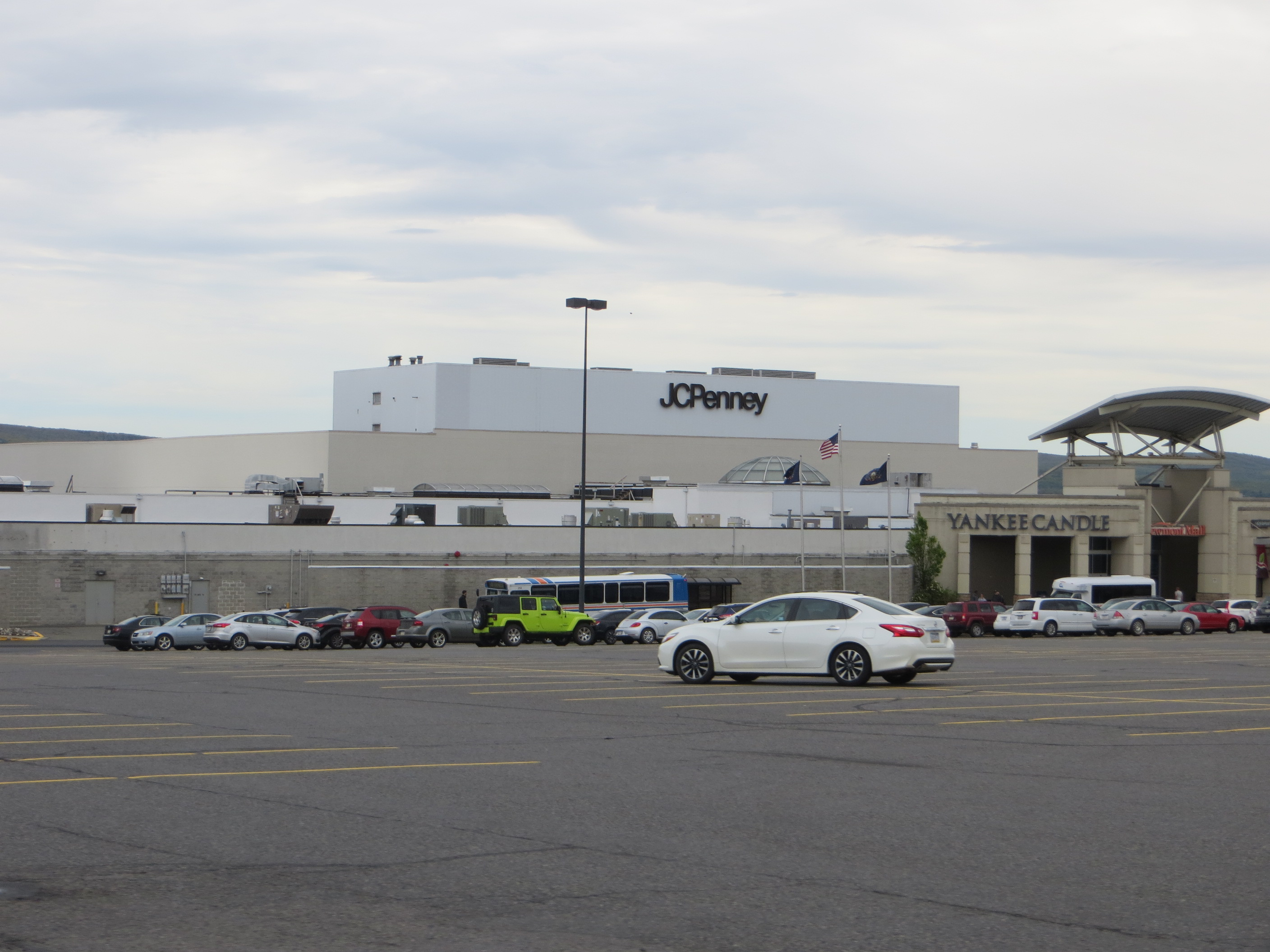
- Looking towards JCPenney, the mall entrance, and Yankee Candle on May 16, 2017
- Location: Scranton, Pennsylvania, United States
- Coordinates: 41.46033°N 75.65631°W
- Address: 100 Viewmont Mall
- Opened: 1968
- Developer: Crown Construction
- Owner: PREIT
- Num. of stores: 90
- Num. of anchor tenants: 4
- Floor area: 768,000 square feet (71,000 m^{2})
- Website: shopviewmontmall.com

Viewmont Mall is a shopping mall located in Scranton, Pennsylvania. It is anchored by JCPenney, Macy's, Dick's House of Sport, and HomeGoods.

== History ==
Viewmont Mall cost $10 million to construct and the original anchors included Grant's, JCPenney and Sears. Sears opened first at the mall in February 1968, with the two floor JCPenney later opening in October. Grant's closed at the Viewmont Mall in 1976 and was replaced by Hess's the same year. Hess's built a larger store starting in 1987. Sears received major changes in 1993 that roughly doubled the store's size. Hess's closed in late summer 1994, and was replaced by Kaufmann's in Fall 1995. In April 1999, it was announced the General Cinemas theater would close after being located at the mall since November 1973. The final day of operation was on January 17, 2000, with the building later being demolished and replaced by a Borders. Viewmont, along with Wyoming Valley Mall was sold by Crown American to PREIT in 2003. Kaufmann's was renamed Macy's in September 2006. Viewmont Mall received a major renovation in 2007.

The malls food court in 2014 received significant changes including the addition of Buffalo Wild Wings. Sears closed in mid-2016 and was demolished later in the year. PREIT knew Sears would not remain at the mall several years before its lease expired. Dick's Sporting Goods and Field & Stream were announced as Sears replacement in April 2016 with the dual store opening in September 2017. HomeGoods opened in August 2017 next to Field & Stream, on former Sears space. Dick's Sporting Goods and Field & Stream temporarily shut down at end of January 2023. The store was converted into a Dick's House of Sport which opened in August.
