= History of cooperatives in the United States =

The history of cooperatives in the United States extends to pre-independence times. With the exception of credit unions and mutual banking institutions, most cooperatives have held a light footprint on the economic history of the United States, compared to the economies of Europe.

The development of mutual organizations and cooperatives in the United States has a history spanning from the 18th century to the present day, reflecting the evolution of collective economic and social efforts. The 18th century marked the beginning with the establishment of the earliest mutual organization, in the British North American colonies in 1735, although it was short-lived due to a devastating fire. The Philadelphia Contributionship by Benjamin Franklin in 1752 is the oldest continuing mutual insurance company in the continental United States.

The 19th century saw further development with the formation of the Boston Mechanics' and Laborers' Mutual Benefit Association in 1845, inspired by the British Rochdale Pioneers. This period set the stage for the expansion of cooperative movements in the United States.

The early 20th century saw a surge in consumer co-ops, especially during the Great Depression, when the establishment of self-help cooperatives was advocated by figures like Upton Sinclair and supported by Franklin Roosevelt's New Deal. This era underscored the resilience and adaptability of cooperatives, with many surviving to their fiftieth anniversaries and beyond.

In the 21st century, cooperatives continue to play a crucial role in various sectors, including health care reform debates and the establishment of worker cooperatives, in partnership with international cooperatives like the Mondragon Corporation. The National Cooperative Business Association lists over 29,000 cooperative businesses.

== 18th century ==
=== Colonial era ===
The earliest mutual organization established in the British North American colonies was created in 1735 in Charleston, South Carolina, but was liquidated following a 1740 fire which gutted much of the city's buildings and had left the company unable to recoup the losses. The Philadelphia Contributionship mutual insurance company, founded by Benjamin Franklin in 1752, is the oldest continuing mutual insurance company in the continental United States.

== 19th century ==
The Boston Mechanics' and Laborers' Mutual Benefit Association was founded in 1845 as a mutual organization styled after the British Rochdale Pioneers.

== 20th century ==
On May 20, 2019, the National Register of Historic Places in the United States, listed two four story sixteen apartment buildings, Alku and Alku Toinen, (Finnish for Beginning and Beginning Second), located at 816 and 826 43rd Street, Kings County Brooklyn New York, as the first two coop buildings in the US, built by Finnish immigrants in 1916, on the National Register of Historic Places. Previously, on March 21, 2019, the New York State Office of Parks, Recreation and Historic Preservation designated both buildings as Historic Sites in New York State. United States Department of the Interior, National Park Service / National Register of Historic Places Registration Form NPS Form 10-900 OMB No. 1024-0018 (Expires 5/31/2012) Alku & Alku Toinen DRAFT Kings County, NY, Name of Property County and State, Sections 9-end page 9

By 1920, there were 2,600 consumer co-ops in the United States – all but eleven were general stores – and 80% were in towns with populations of less than 2,500. Combined sales volume for these stores was about US$260 million.

=== Great Depression ===
Upton Sinclair's EPIC movement became one of the leading proponents for the establishment of self-help cooperatives in California during the Great Depression, as was Japanese pacifist Toyohiko Kagawa, who advocated for "brotherhood economics" as an alternative to communism and fascism on both sides of the Pacific. This advocacy for cooperatives, combined with then-president Franklin Roosevelt's New Deal, culminated in the establishment of cooperatives in Berkeley, California, Palo Alto, Eau Claire, Wisconsin, Hanover, New Hampshire, Hyde Park, Chicago (closed January 2008), and Greenbelt, Maryland. While all these cooperatives lasted to at least their fiftieth anniversaries, the Consumers' Cooperative of Berkeley ultimately closed down, the Eau Claire and Palo Alto cooperatives scaled back their activities, and the Hanover, and Greenbelt cooperatives have survived to this day.

Credit unions, in particular, were established throughout the United States and have remained one of the most visible and productive legacies of the New Deal period.

== 21st century ==
In the healthcare reform debate, health insurance cooperatives were, at one point, proposed as an alternative to the public option, and indeed in some states were instituted as the ACA became law.

Starting in 2001, several states passed laws for the creation of Limited cooperative associations (LCA), a type of multi-stakeholder cooperative which mixes aspects of cooperatives with limited liability companies to allow for outside investment.

In 2009, the United Steelworkers signed an agreement with the Basque Country-based Mondragon Corporation in order to further the establishment and expansion of unionized worker cooperatives in North America.

The National Cooperative Business Association identifies over 29,000 cooperative businesses employing more than 2 million people and accounting for over $650 billion in annual revenue.

== Legislation by state ==
State	Cooperatives	Worker cooperatives	Limited cooperative associations (LCA)	Limited worker cooperative associations (LWCA)
Alabama		Yes		
Alaska	Yes			
Arizona	Yes			
Arkansas	Yes			
California	Yes	Yes		
Colorado	Yes		Yes	
Connecticut	Yes	Yes		
Delaware		Yes		
District of Columbia	Yes		Yes	
Florida				
Georgia	Yes			
Hawaii	Yes			
Idaho				
Illinois	Yes	Yes		Yes
Indiana	Yes			
Iowa	Yes		Yes	
Kansas	Yes			
Kentucky	Yes	Yes	Yes	
Louisiana				
Maine	Yes	Yes		
Maryland	Yes			
Massachusetts	Yes	Yes		
Michigan	Yes	Yes		
Minnesota	Yes		Yes	
Mississippi				
Missouri	Yes			
Montana	Yes			
Nebraska	Yes		Yes	
Nevada	Yes	Yes		
New Hampshire	Yes			
New Jersey		Yes		
New Mexico	Yes			
New York	Yes	Yes		
North Carolina	Yes			
North Dakota	Yes			
Ohio	Yes			
Oklahoma	Yes		Yes	
Oregon	Yes	Yes		
Pennsylvania	Yes	Yes		
Puerto Rico	Yes	Yes		
Rhode Island	Yes	Yes		
South Carolina	Yes			
South Dakota	Yes			
Tennessee			Yes	
Texas	Yes			
Utah	Yes		Yes	
Vermont	Yes	Yes	Yes	
Virginia	Yes	Yes		
U.S. Virgin Islands	Yes			
Washington	Yes	Yes	Yes	
West Virginia	Yes			
Wisconsin	Yes		Yes	
Wyoming			Yes	
