= Charles Christopher Johnson =

British soldier (1789–1854)

Charles Christopher Johnson KLS (29 October 1789 – 30 September 1854) was a British soldier.

== Early life ==
Johnson was born on 29 October 1789. He was the fifth son of eighteen children born to Sir John Johnson, 2nd Baronet and his wife, Mary Nicoll "Polly" (née Watts) Johnson (1751–1815), who was known as Lady Johnson. His father was a Loyalist leader during the American Revolution who were permanently exiled to Montreal, Canada in 1783.

His paternal grandparents were Colonel Sir William Johnson, 1st Baronet, and his wife, Catherine Weissenberg, a Palatine German immigrant. His maternal grandparents were Anne (née DeLancey) Watts (a daughter of Stephen Delancey and descendant of the Van Cortlandt family) and the Hon. John Watts, President of the King's Council, of New York and a descendant of the Van Rensselaer family.

== Career ==
Johnson gained the rank of Lieutenant-Colonel in the 9th Lancers and served as Quartermaster-General in Ireland. He was awarded the Knight of the Order of the Lion and the Sun of Persia.

He was seigneur of Argenteuil, Quebec, property which he inherited from his father.

== Personal life ==
On 8 January 1818, he married Susan Colpoys (d. 1875), daughter of Vice Admiral Sir Edward Griffith Colpoys of Northbrook House in Hampshire. Together, they were the parents of six children:

- William Johnson (b. 1821), who died without issue.
- John Ormsby Johnson (1822–1881), a Vice-Admiral who married Edith Renira Twyford, daughter of Rev. Charles Edward Twyford, in 1852.
- Charles Turquand Johnson (1825–1851), who studied at Gonville and Caius College, Cambridge for five years.
- Maria Bowes Johnson (c. 1830–1871), who married Rev. William Bell Christian of Ewanrigg Hall, son of John Christian, a Deemster of the Isle of Man.
- Edward Colpoys Johnson (1835–1900), who married Barbara Williamson, daughter of Rev. James Williamson, in 1863. After her death, he married Ada Olivia Pinto, daughter of Edward Pinto, in 1874.
- Mary Anne Susan Johnson (c. 1838–1923), who married Henry Fraser Curwen of Workington Hall, the High Sheriff of Cumberland.

Johnson died on 30 September 1854 and his widow died on 23 February 1875.

=== Descendants ===
Through his son John, he was the grandfather of Frederick Colpoys Ormsby Johnson (1858–1932) and Captain Robert Warren Johnson (1868–1914), who married Grace Isobel Paley (fourth daughter of Algernon Herbert Paley) father of Lt. Col. Sir John Paley Johnson, 6th Baronet (1907–1975), who inherited Charles' father's baronetcy from the descendants of his elder brother, John Johnson, including Sir William Johnson, 4th Baronet.
