= Brotherhood economics =

Christian economic system

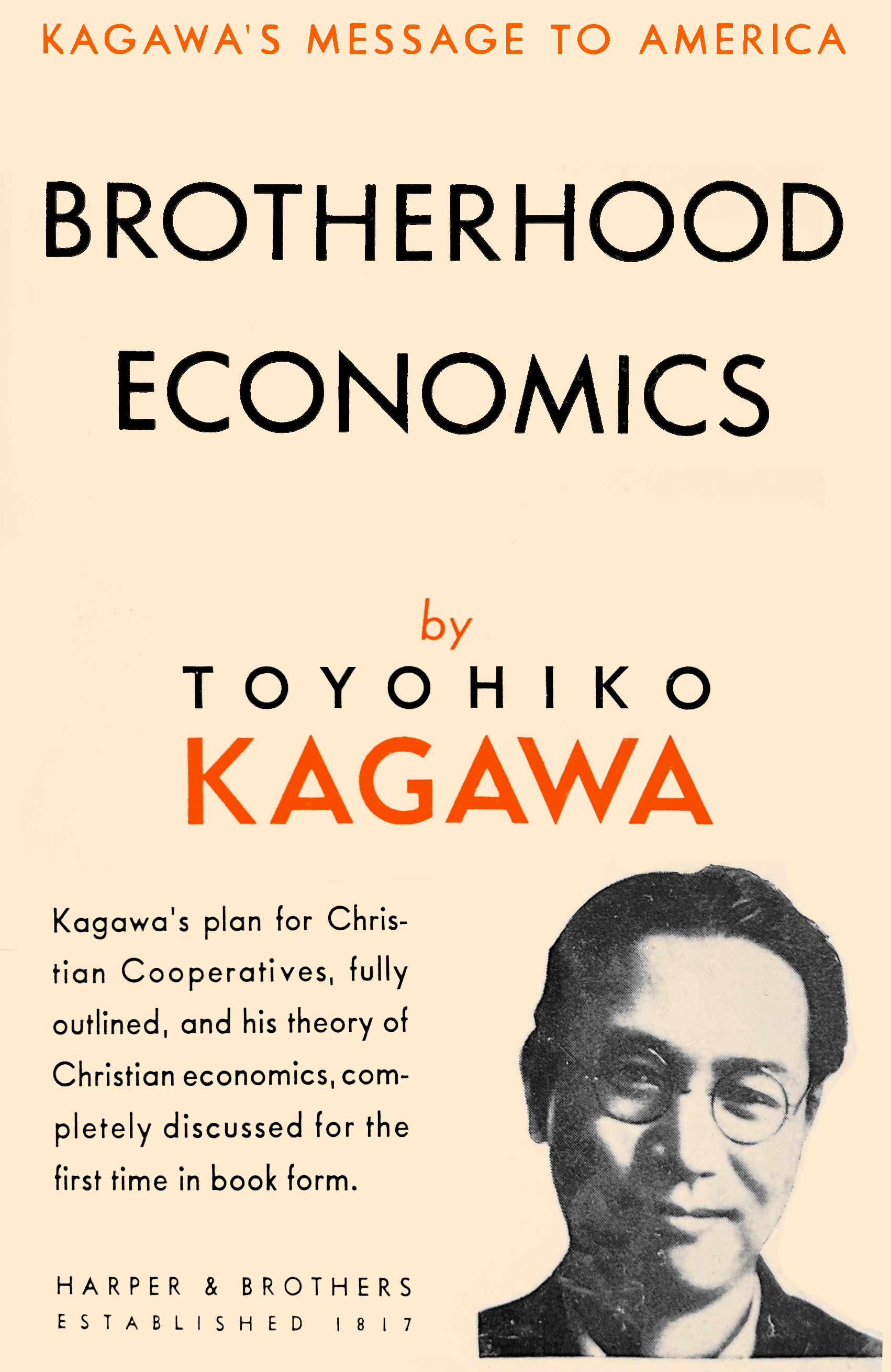
Brotherhood Economics 1st Edition - Kagawa, Toyohiko - Harper & Brothers, 1936

Brotherhood economics (Japanese: 兄弟経済; Hepburn: Kyōdai Keizai) is a socio-economic concept associated with Toyohiko Kagawa, a Japanese Christian novelist and social reformer, and the author of the book Brotherhood Economics published in 1936. Influenced by his Christian faith and his aversion to warfare, critiqued prevailing political economies of his time—fascism, Soviet-style communism, and capitalism—for their concentration of wealth and power, which he believed perpetuated poverty. He proposed an alternative model where Christian churches, cooperatives, and pacifist organizations collaborate to foster small, local economies grounded in cooperation.

== Historical context ==
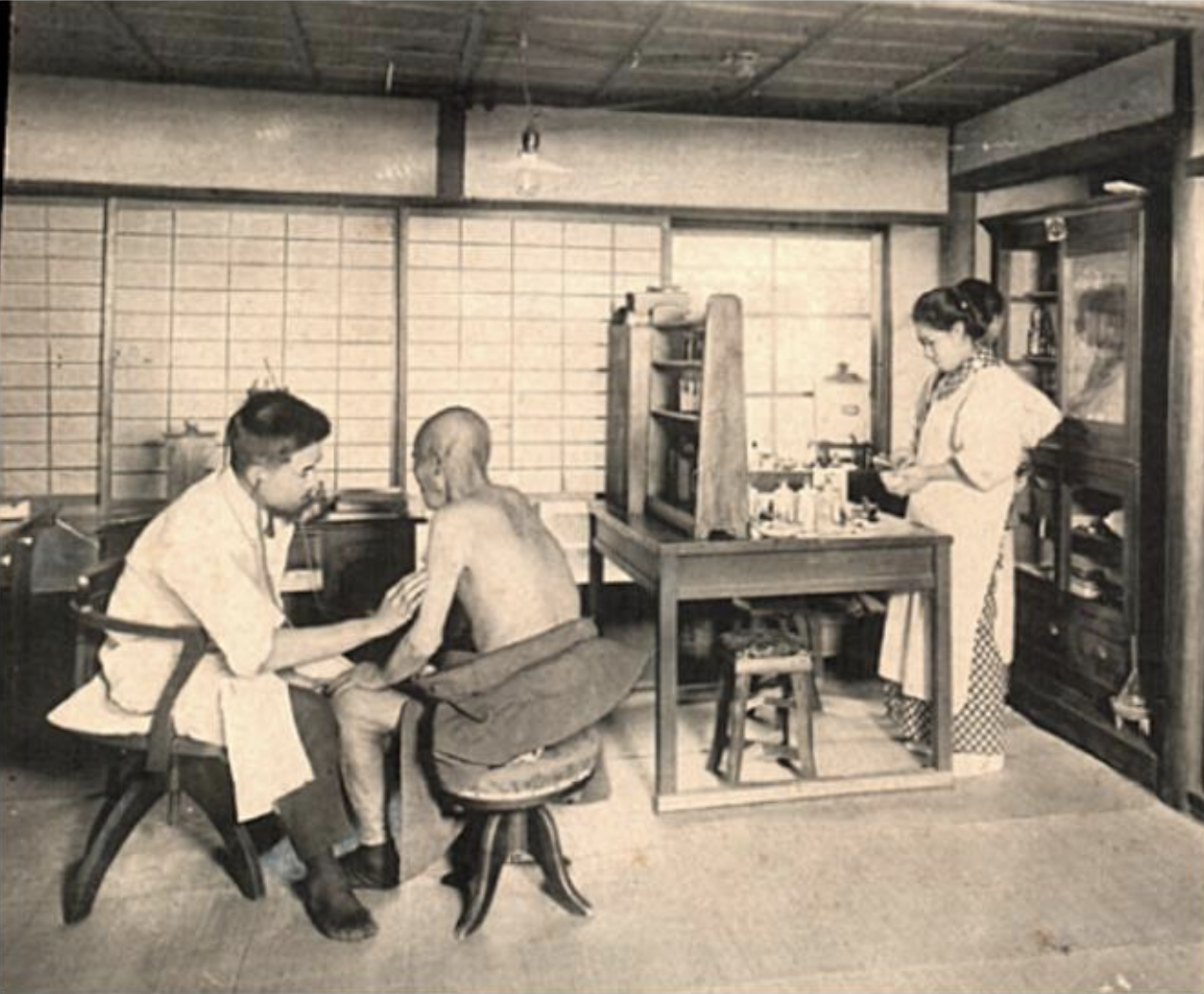
Jesus Band Free Clinic

In 1909, while studying at the Kobe Theological Seminary, Kagawa moved to Kobe's Shinkawa slums. Here, he engaged in relief work, aiding thousands of impoverished residents. He identified three major weaknesses among the residents: the physically weak, the mentally weak, and the morally weak. Therefore, a core aspect of his Christian mission involved establishing free medical clinics, educational facilities, and spaces for preaching the gospel.

In 1914, he traveled to the United States to enroll at Princeton Theological Seminary for three years, pursuing studies in divinity. While there he observed the nearby New York City slums and the workings of urban labor unions.

Kagawa returned to Japan and actively participated in peace initiatives, advocated for labor unions, promoted environmental conservation, and supported the movement for universal suffrage. He faced multiple arrests for his activities, which he viewed as obligations aligned with the principles of a Christian "Good Samaritan". During his periods of imprisonment, Kagawa dedicated his time to writing.

In the early 1920s, Kagawa encountered disagreements with radical labor union leaders due to his assertion that spiritual reform must accompany authentic social and economic reform.

As he became more influenced by the gradualist ideas of British Guild Socialists and the cooperative movement of the Rochdale Weavers, he started advocating for cooperative economics as a favorable option compared to both communism and capitalism. In 1922, Kagawa declared himself as a "Guild Socialist" in terms of his political views, his approach is non-militant, and he could be described as a "passivist", strictly adhering to peaceful methods.

Kagawa published Brotherhood Economics in 1936, wherein according to him he further develops the themes initially presented in four lectures titled "Christian Brotherhood and Economic Reconstruction" at Colgate-Rochester Divinity School in April 1936.

== Seven cooperatives types ==
Kagawa advocates for the establishment of seven types of cooperatives: health and life insurance, producers', marketing, credit, mutual aid, public utility, and consumers'. These cooperatives would serve as the foundation of the legislative body within the political state he envisions, emphasizing the necessity of Christian principles for its realization. He contends that without the development of a Christian brotherhood, an ideal economic society cannot be achieved, distinguishing his vision from socialism, communism, and capitalism's exploitative nature.

Kagawa stresses the need to base economic revolution on society as a whole rather than any specific segment, asserting that the labor movement alone cannot accomplish necessary economic reconstruction. Additionally, he emphasizes the importance of a consumption system alongside production, suggesting that private ownership and enterprise could coexist with legislative intervention to safeguard the common good. While Kagawa's proposals include ambitious goals like eradicating corruption and relying on the spirit of the Cross to address economic challenges, he acknowledges the practical limitations and challenges associated with implementing cooperatives.

== Applications ==
=== Japan ===
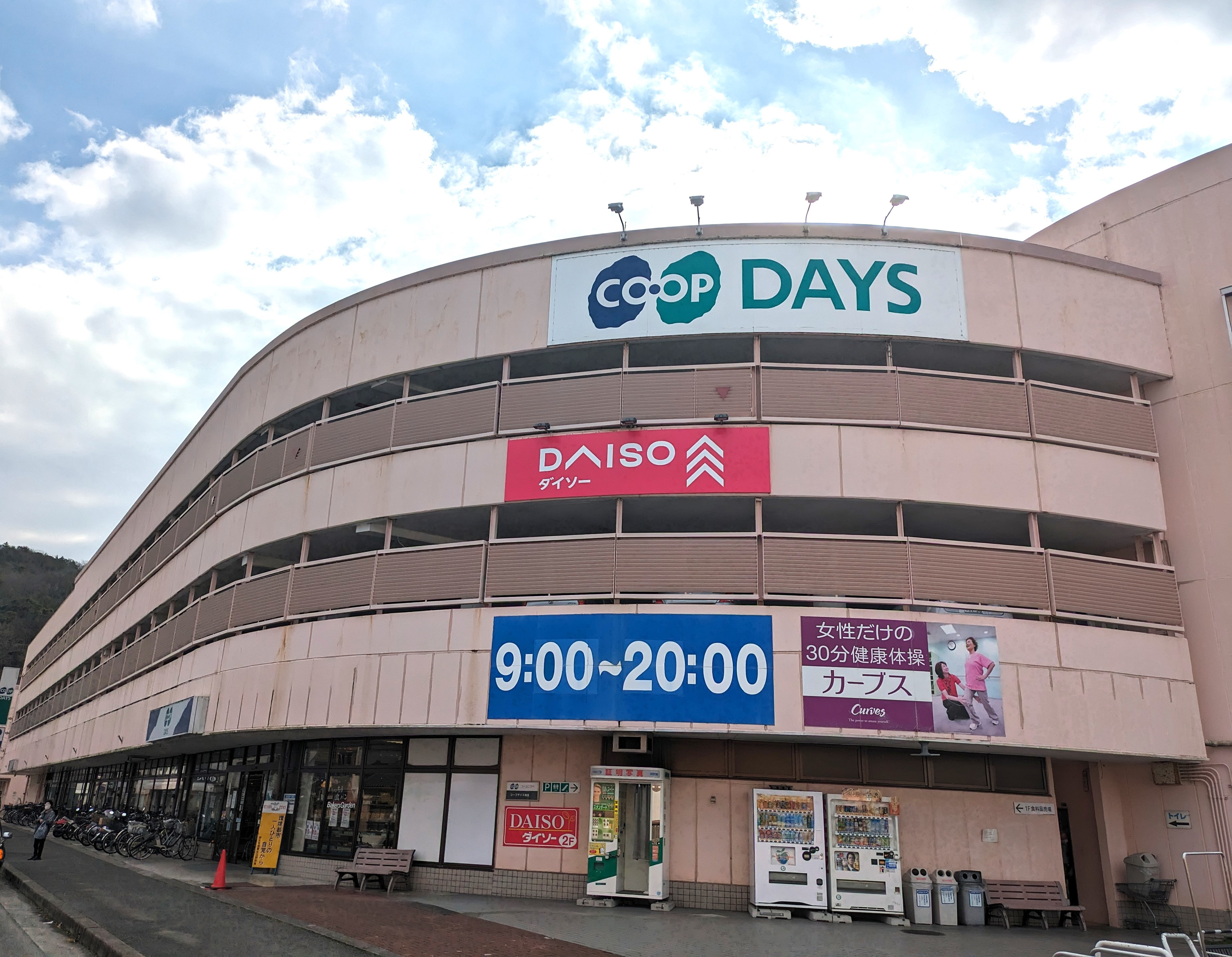
Kobe Cooperative Association, COOP Days Aioi (Asahi, Aioi City) in Japan

In 1921, Kagawa established the Kobe Consumer Co-operative and the Nada Consumer Co-operative in Kobe. Subsequently, these entities merged to form Co-op Kobe. Additionally, Kagawa was instrumental in founding numerous other cooperatives, including the Kyoto Consumer Co-operative, Tokyo Student's Consumer Co-operative, and Tokyo Iryou (Medical) Consumer Co-operative. Co-op Kobe currently has a membership of 65 million individuals and achieves an annual turnover exceeding $135 billion.

=== Student housing ===
The inception of student co-ops traces back to Gainesville, Florida, and Austin, Texas, in the 1890s, initially as dining clubs. However, the concept of cooperative student housing gained traction during the Great Depression, spurred by economic hardships that prompted students to seek innovative solutions. A pivotal moment occurred with a speaking tour led by Japanese co-op advocate Toyohiko Kagawa, arranged by the student Christian movement. Kagawa's lectures on "Brotherhood Economics", emphasizing the potential of cooperatives to foster social, political, and economic justice, resonated deeply at state universities in Berkeley, Los Angeles, Ann Arbor, and Toronto. These presentations inspired students to establish co-op housing organizations, which have since evolved to accommodate hundreds of students.

=== Women's Cooperative Guilds in Nova Scotia ===
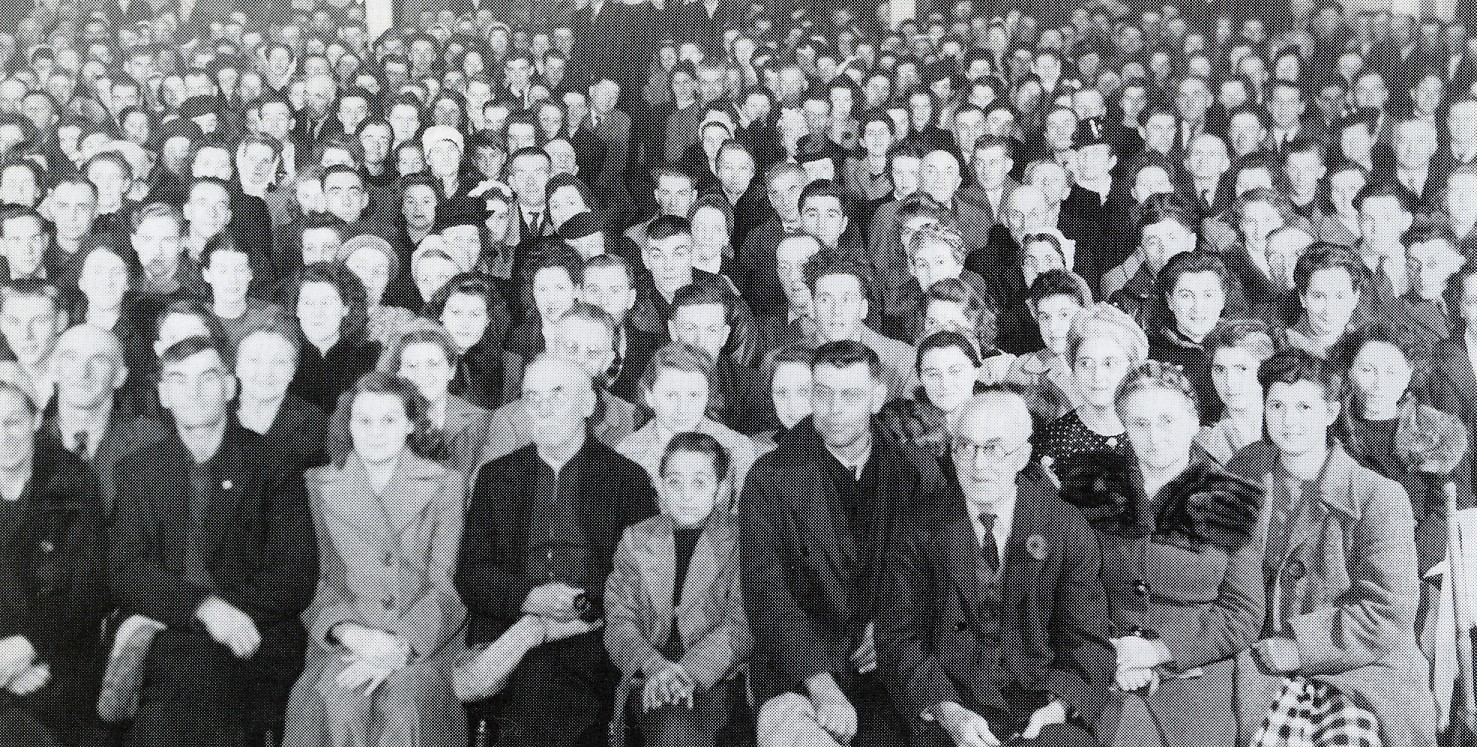
The cooperative movement conference in Chéticamp, Nova Scotia (Canada), 1947

In the context of Atlantic Canada, the implementation of Brotherhood economics within cooperatives posed challenges for women, described by Mary Ellicott Arnold as a significant obstacle to navigate. Despite the inherently patriarchal structure of these institutions, some women were able to assert agency in fulfilling their own needs, a departure from the prevailing norm where women typically accepted what was offered to them. While these individual initiatives did not fully realize the cooperatives' vision of gender equality nor dismantle male dominance within the cooperatives, they did afford certain women the opportunity to exert degrees of social and economic influence within these structures.

=== Toronto ===
Kagawa's op-op idea garnered significant popularity in North America. In the early thirties, the Kagawa Co-operating Committee, led by Richard Roberts, an interdenominational group of Canadian churchmen, was established in Toronto. This group, comprising about thirty individuals, frequently convened in retreats where they engaged in a blend of oriental meditation and prayer, both individually and collectively. Roberts communicated to Kagawa that their program was viewed as radical and experimental for Canadians, particularly given that no similar initiatives had been attempted within living memory in Protestant circles in Toronto.

== See also ==
- Toyohiko Kagawa
- Christian socialism
- Co-operative economics
- Pacifism
- Social economy
- Distributism
- Small is beautiful
- Christianity in Japan
- Mutual aid (organization theory)
- Sabbath economics
- Syncretic politics

== Sources ==
- Hastings, Thomas John (2015). Seeing All Things Whole: The Scientific Mysticism and Art of Kagawa Toyohiko(1888–1960). T. Wipf and Stock. ISBN 9781498204088.
- Kagawa, Toyohiko (1936). Brotherhood Economics. New York: Harper & Brothers.
- Neal, R. (1998). Brotherhood Economics: Women and Co-operatives in Nova Scotia. Canada: UCCB Press. ISBN 9780920336656.
