= John Allen Johnson-Walsh =

Irish landowner and Member of Parliament (1744-1831)

Sir John Allen Johnson-Walsh, 1st Baronet (bapt. 19 September 1744 – 16 December 1831) was an Irish landowner and Member of Parliament.

He was born John Allen Johnson (also spelled Johnston), the eldest son of Allen Johnson, of Kilternan in County Dublin, by his wife Olivia, only daughter of John Walsh, of Ballykilcavan in Queen's County. The second son was Henry Johnson, who was also created a Baronet in 1818.

His father died on 30 July 1747, so, on the death of his grandfather Allen Johnson on 25 August following, Johnson succeeded to the family estates. On 24 February 1775, he was created a Baronet in the Baronetage of Ireland. He represented Baltinglass in the Irish House of Commons from 1784 to 1790 and was High Sheriff of Queen's County in 1792. In 1808 he succeeded his maternal uncle Raphael Walsh (Dean of Dromore) to the estate of Ballykilcavan, and adopted the additional surname of Walsh by Royal Licence of 9 May 1809.

In 1783, he married Sackvilla (died 1841), first daughter of Edward Brereton, of Springmount in Queen's County, by his wife Frances, daughter of Philip Rawson. Their children included:

- John Allen Johnson-Walsh, eldest son. High Sheriff of Queen's County in 1812; predeceased his father.
- Sir Edward John Johnson-Walsh, 2nd Baronet. High Sheriff of Queen's County in 1825; died unmarried.
- The Rev. Sir Hunt Henry Johnson-Walsh, 3rd Baronet. Vicar of Stradbally; father of the fourth Baronet and grandfather of the fifth Baronet, on whose death the baronetcy became extinct.

He died at his seat in Ballykilcavan, aged 87.

Baronetage of the United Kingdom
New creation	Baronet (of Ballykilcavan); 1775–1831	Succeeded by Edward Johnson-Walsh
