= Rebecca Franks =

- Born: 1760; Philadelphia, Province of Pennsylvania, British America
- Died: September 1823 (aged 62–63); Bath, Somerset, England
- Known for: Loyalist
- Spouse: Sir Henry Johnson, 1st Baronet
- Parent: David Franks

Rebecca Franks (1760 – September 1823) was a prominent member of loyalist society in Philadelphia, Pennsylvania during the American Revolution.

== Life ==
Rebecca Franks was born in Pennsylvania about 1760, the daughter and youngest child of David Franks, a businessman, and the sister of Abigail (1745–1798), the wife of Andrew Hamilton (son of the noted attorney of the same name and proprietor of "The Woodlands"), and the niece of Phila Franks, who married Oliver De Lancey an American loyalist politician and a major general during the American War of Independence. She was the granddaughter of Abigail Franks, who wrote about the social, political, and religious milieu of 18th-century New York in a series of letters to her son in England between the years 1733 and 1748.

During the War of Independence, she, like her father, sided with Great Britain, and during the British occupation of Philadelphia in 1778 she took part in the "Mischianza," a celebrated, elaborate fête given in honor of departing British General Sir William Howe, and at which Major John André presided. "The Times, a Poem by Camilio Querno, Poet Laureate of the Congress," a loyalist composition, has been attributed to her. Her literary ability, as well as her vivacity and wit, were well known; she carried on a correspondence with prominent men, and General Charles Lee of the Continental Army addressed to her a letter that attracted much attention, being published in the magazines of the day.

In 1782 in New York, she married Lieutenant-Colonel (later General) Henry Johnson, of the 17th Regiment of Foot, and moved to Bath, England. Johnson distinguished himself by an act of gallantry in one of the outbreaks of rebellion in Ireland, and received the honor of a baronetcy, whereupon Rebecca became Lady Johnson. They had two sons, one of whom was killed at the Battle of Waterloo. She remained in Bath until her death in September 1823.

== Sources ==
- Elizabeth F. Ellet, The Women of the American Revolution, Third Edition. New York: Baker and Scribner, 1849.
- Abigail Franks, Edith Belle Gelles, The Letters of Abigaill Levy Franks, 1733–1748 published 2004, Yale University Press, ISBN 0-300-10345-X
- George Washington's Expense Account, by Gen. George Washington and Marvin Kitman, Published 2001, Grove Press, ISBN 0-8021-3773-3
