= JCCU =

JCCU may refer to:

- Japanese Consumers' Co-operative Union
- Jasper County Community Unit School District 1
- Jesuit Conference of Canada and the United States
