= Sir Henry Johnson, 1st Baronet =

British Army officer (1748-1835)

Sir Henry Johnson GCB Bt
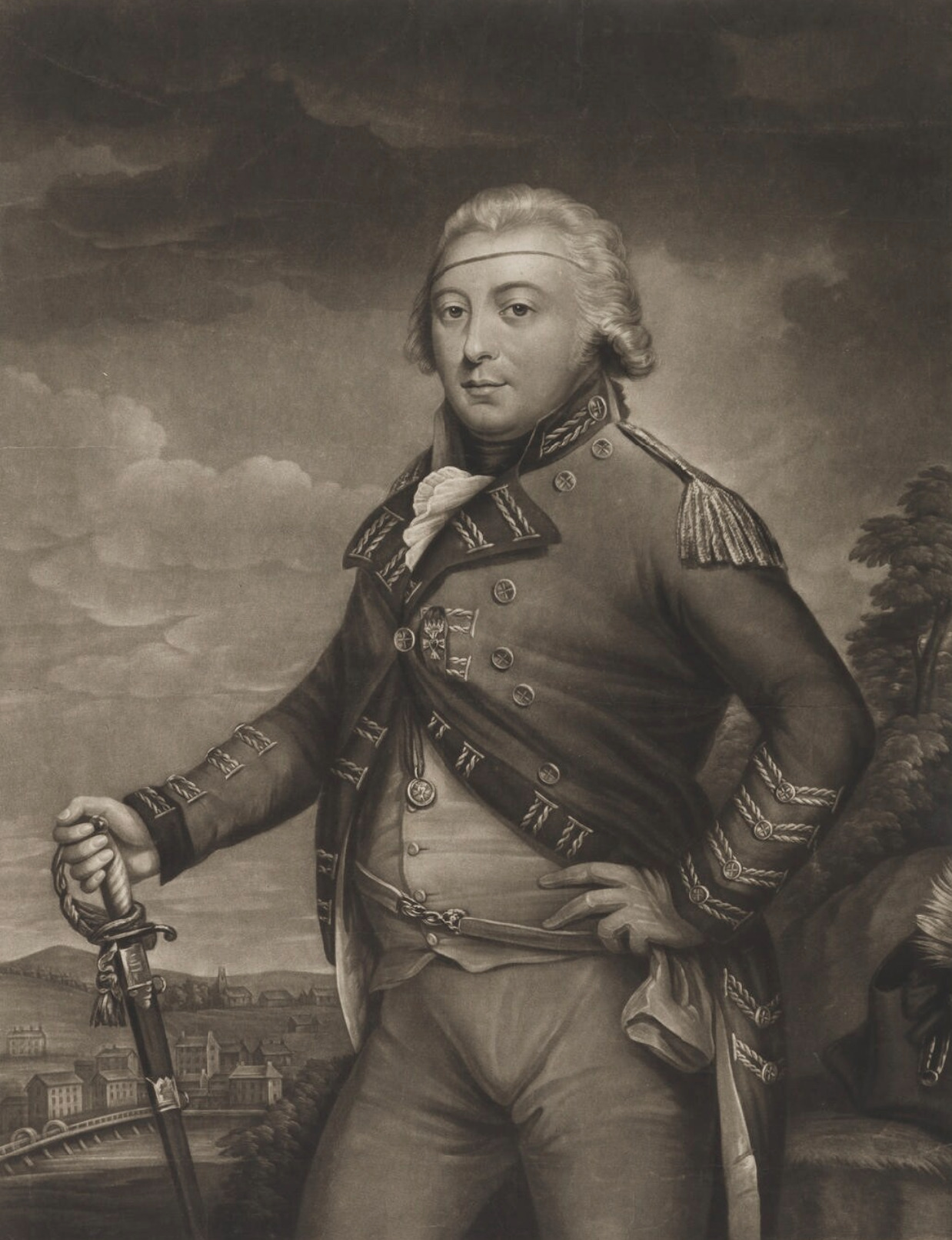
- Portrait by Robert Dunkarton, 1801
- Born: 1 January 1748; Dublin
- Died: 18 March 1835 (aged 87); Bath
- Military career
- Allegiance: Great Britain; United Kingdom
- Branch: British Army
- Rank: General
- Conflicts: American Revolutionary War; French Revolutionary Wars; Irish Rebellion of 1798

General Sir Henry Johnson, 1st Baronet GCB (1 January 1748 – 18 March 1835) was a British Army officer.

== Life ==
He was the second son of Allen Johnson of Kilternan, County Dublin, and his wife Olivia, daughter of John Walsh of Ballykilcavan, Queen's County; his elder brother, John Allen Johnson-Walsh, was created a baronet in 1775. He was appointed ensign on 19 February 1761 in the 28th foot, in which he became lieutenant in 1762, and captain in 1763, and is stated to have served with the regiment (probably in the West Indies) during that time.

Johnson became major in the 28th in 1775, went to North America, and was posted by Sir William Howe to one of the provisional battalions of light infantry, which he commanded in the American Revolutionary War campaigns of 1776–8. He was appointed lieutenant-colonel 17th foot on 8 October 1778, and commanded that regiment in the operations in the Jerseys. He was in command of the garrison at Stony Point when it was overrun and captured by the Continental Corps of Light Infantry under Wayne in July 1779. When returned from captivity as a prisoner of war, he demanded a court martial and was exonerated of any wrongdoing. He resumed command of the 17th Regiment in Virginia and Carolina, under Lord Cornwallis.

On the surrender at York Town in October 1781, Johnson returned home and remained unemployed until the peace. He subsequently commanded the 17th foot in Nova Scotia and Newfoundland. At the commencement of the war with France he was appointed inspector-general of recruiting for the English establishment in Ireland, and held the post until 1798. During the rebellion in that year he was detached with three thousand men to occupy New Ross, and defeated the rebels when they attacked the place on 5 June 1798. It was the hardest fight during the rebellion. Lord Cornwallis had an indifferent opinion of Johnson, and wrote of him as "a wrong-headed blockhead".

Johnson was made colonel 81st foot in 1798, became a lieutenant-general in 1799, and governor of Ross Castle in 1801. He held a major general's command in Ireland from 1798 to 1803, became a full general in 1809, was created a baronet on 1 December 1818, and in 1819 was transferred to the colonelcy of the 5th foot. He died on 18 March 1835, at the age of eighty-seven, at Bath, where there is a monument erected by The Ancient and Most Benevolent Order of The Friendly Brothers of Saint Patrick to him in the Abbey Church.

== Family ==
Johnson married in 1782 Rebecca Franks, daughter of David Franks of Philadelphia, and sister of John Franks of Isleworth, Middlesex, by whom he had a family. She died in 1823. Their eldest son, Henry Allen Johnson (1785–1860), who matriculated at Christ Church, Oxford in 1804. and was a student of the college to 1817, and afterwards aide-de-camp to the Prince of Orange, succeeded as second baronet. Their younger son, George, a captain in the 81st Foot, was killed in Portugal in 1812.

== Notes ==
Attribution

This article incorporates text from a publication now in the public domain: Lee, Sidney, ed. (1892). "Johnson, Henry (1748-1835)". Dictionary of National Biography. Vol. 30. London: Smith, Elder & Co.

Military offices
| Preceded by John Graves Simcoe | Colonel of the 81st Regiment of Foot; 1798–1819 | Succeeded by Sir James Kempt |
Baronetage of the United Kingdom
| New creation | Baronet (of Bath); 1818–1835 | Succeeded by Henry Allen Johnson |
