= Sir John Johnson, 2nd Baronet =

American-born military officer, politician and landowner

Sir John Johnson Bt
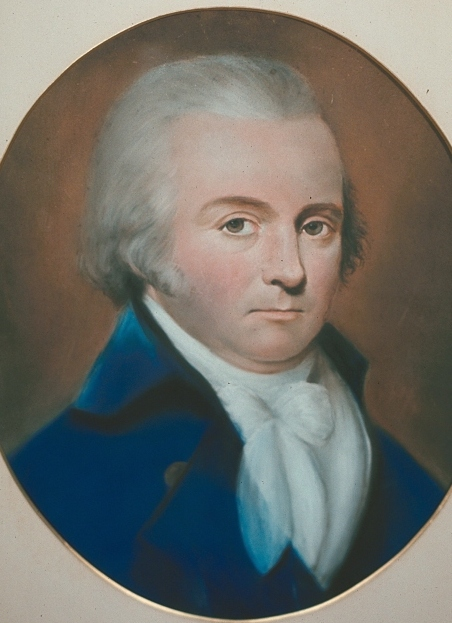
- A 1792 portrait of Johnson

Superintendent-General of Indian Affairs
- In office March 14, 1782 – January 4, 1830
- Preceded by: Guy Johnson
- Succeeded by: Duncan Campbell Napier

Personal details
- Born: John Wysen Bergh; 5 November 1741 Amsterdam, New York
- Died: 4 January 1830 (aged 88) Montreal, Lower Canada
- Spouses: Clarissa Putman (1765–1773) Mary Nicoll Watts (m. 1773; died 1815)
- Children: 20
- Parent(s): William Johnson, Bt; Catherine Weissenberg
- Relatives: Sir William Johnson, 4th Baronet (grandson)
- Education: The Academy and College of Philadelphia

Military service
- Allegiance: Great Britain
- Rank: Brigadier-General
- Unit: King's Royal Regiment of New York
- Battles/wars: American Revolutionary War

Brigadier-General Sir John Johnson, 2nd Baronet (5 November 1741 – 4 January 1830) was an American-born military officer, politician and landowner who fought as a Loyalist during the American Revolutionary War. He was the son of Sir William Johnson, 1st Baronet, a prominent British Indian Department official in the Thirteen Colonies. Johnson inherited his father's baronetcy and estate in 1774.

Johnson moved to the Province of Quebec during the Revolutionary War with his family and allies, as he was at risk of arrest by Patriot authorities. During the war, he served in the King's Royal Regiment of New York and was promoted to the rank of brigadier general in 1782. In the same year, Johnson was also appointed as Superintendent-General of Indian Affairs, a position he occupied until his death in 1830.

After the war, Johnson was appointed by the Crown to distribute lands in Upper Canada to exiled Loyalists, and he helped resettle approximately 3,800 Loyalist refugees in 1784. Johnson also served in the Legislative Council of Lower Canada.

== Early life ==
Johnson was born near Amsterdam, New York on 5 November 1741. He was the only son of Colonel Sir William Johnson, 1st Baronet, and his common-law wife, Catherine Weissenberg, a Palatine German immigrant. As his parents never married, he was baptized John Wysen Bergh by Rev. Henry Barclay February 7, 1741/2 as an Anglican in the chapel at Fort Hunter. (Note: As his parents never married, he could not have legally become the second baronet. However, as he had been Knighted he was Sir John Johnson in his own right. In 2013, it was brought to the attention of the Ministry of Justice at the House of Lords in London by a 5 x great grand daughter of Catherine Weissenberg.) His father was a military commander during the French and Indian War (Seven Years' War) who had promoted the Anglo-American settlement of the Mohawk Valley and trade relations with the Mohawk along with founding the village of Johnstown in Tryon County, New York.

His paternal grandparents were Christopher Johnson and Lady Anne Warren, sister of Vice Admiral Sir Peter Warren (who married his eventual wife's aunt, Susannah Delancey, a daughter of Stephen Delancey), descendants of King William the Conqueror. From 1757 until 1760, John studied sporadically at The Academy and College of Philadelphia. From 13 years of age, he accompanied his father on military expeditions and conferences with the Indians.

== Career ==
In 1771, Johnson became the last Provincial Grand Master of Masons in the colonies of Province of New York, New Jersey and Pennsylvania. At his father's death in 1774, Johnson became a wealthy landowner and succeeded to his father's title of baronetcy, along with his extensive estates and 20 slaves. In 1775, he was appointed doorkeeper of the New York General Assembly.

=== American Revolution ===
In January 1776, nine months after the outbreak of the American Revolution, Johnson gathered several hundred armed supporters at Johnstown. He sent a letter to Governor William Tryon, through Captain John McDonell, saying that he and his Loyalist neighbors had conferred about raising a battalion for the British cause. He also said he could raise 500 Indian warriors who, when used with his regular troops, could retake all of the forts captured by the rebels.

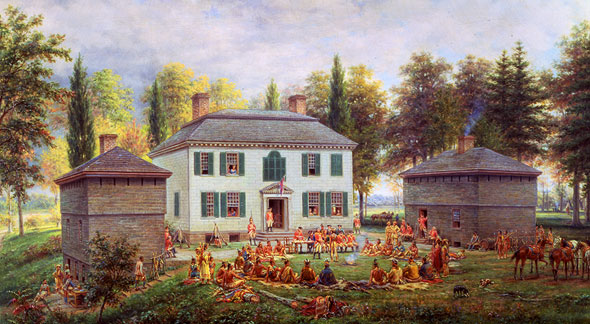
William Johnson hosting an Iroquois conference at Johnson Hall in 1772 (painting by E. L. Henry, 1903)

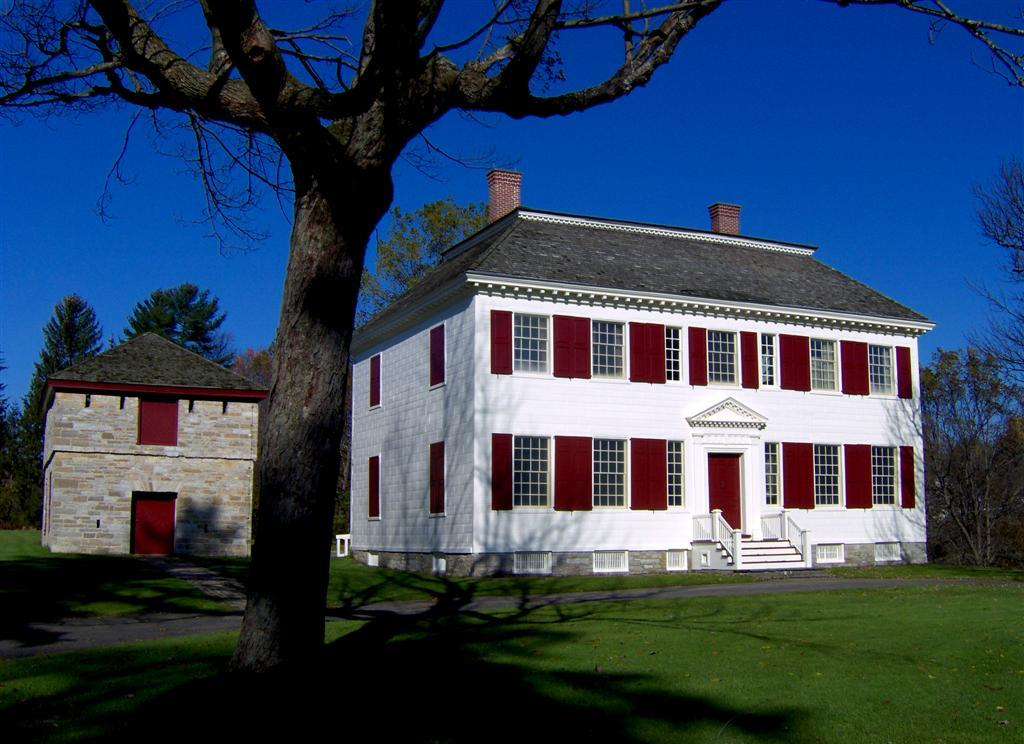
Johnson Hall 2006

On January 20, 1776, Major General Philip Schuyler, with a force of Continental troops and the Tryon County militia numbering around 3,000, disarmed Johnson and about 300 of his Loyalist supporters; Schuyler paroled Johnson. Hearing in May 1776 of another force being sent to arrest him, Johnson decided to flee with his family and supporters to Canada. He led about 170 of his tenants and allies among the Iroquois Confederacy to Montreal, Quebec. Sir John's loyalty to King George III cost him his home in Johnstown and extensive property in the Mohawk Valley, all of which was confiscated after the war by the State of New York.

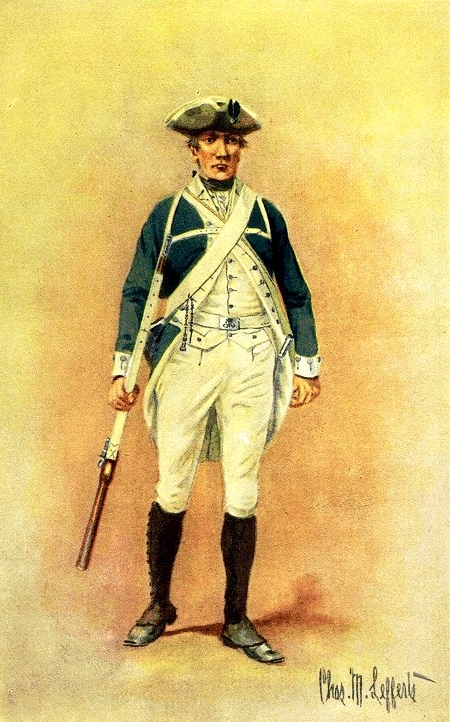
Private, Johnson's Royal Regiment of New York, 1776, by Charles M. Lefferts.

Johnson and his followers formed the core of the King's Royal Regiment of New York, a Loyalist regiment which saw substantial action against American forces from New York under his command throughout the revolutionary war. He was promoted to the rank of brigadier general on the American Establishment in 1782.

On March 14, 1782, he received the appointment of Superintendent General and Inspector General of Indian affairs from Sir Frederick Haldimand, due to the dismissal of his cousin Guy Johnson. In 1781, General MacLean reported that Guy Johnson's wartime accounts were "Extravagant, wonderful & fictitious, and the quality of articles so extraordinary, new & uncommon". Guy Johnson was suspended as superintendent and summoned to Montreal, where Haldimand criticized his conduct as "reprehensible". Guy Johnson was disgraced and departed for London to defend his reports to the government, but met with no success. Sir John took over Fort Niagara as superintendent of Indian affairs in his cousin's absence, later to be appointed in full. The authority of the position extended over all northern First Nations allied with the Crown, including four of the Iroquois League nations, most of whom had relocated to Canada after having been allies of the British during the revolution.

=== Post-war Years ===
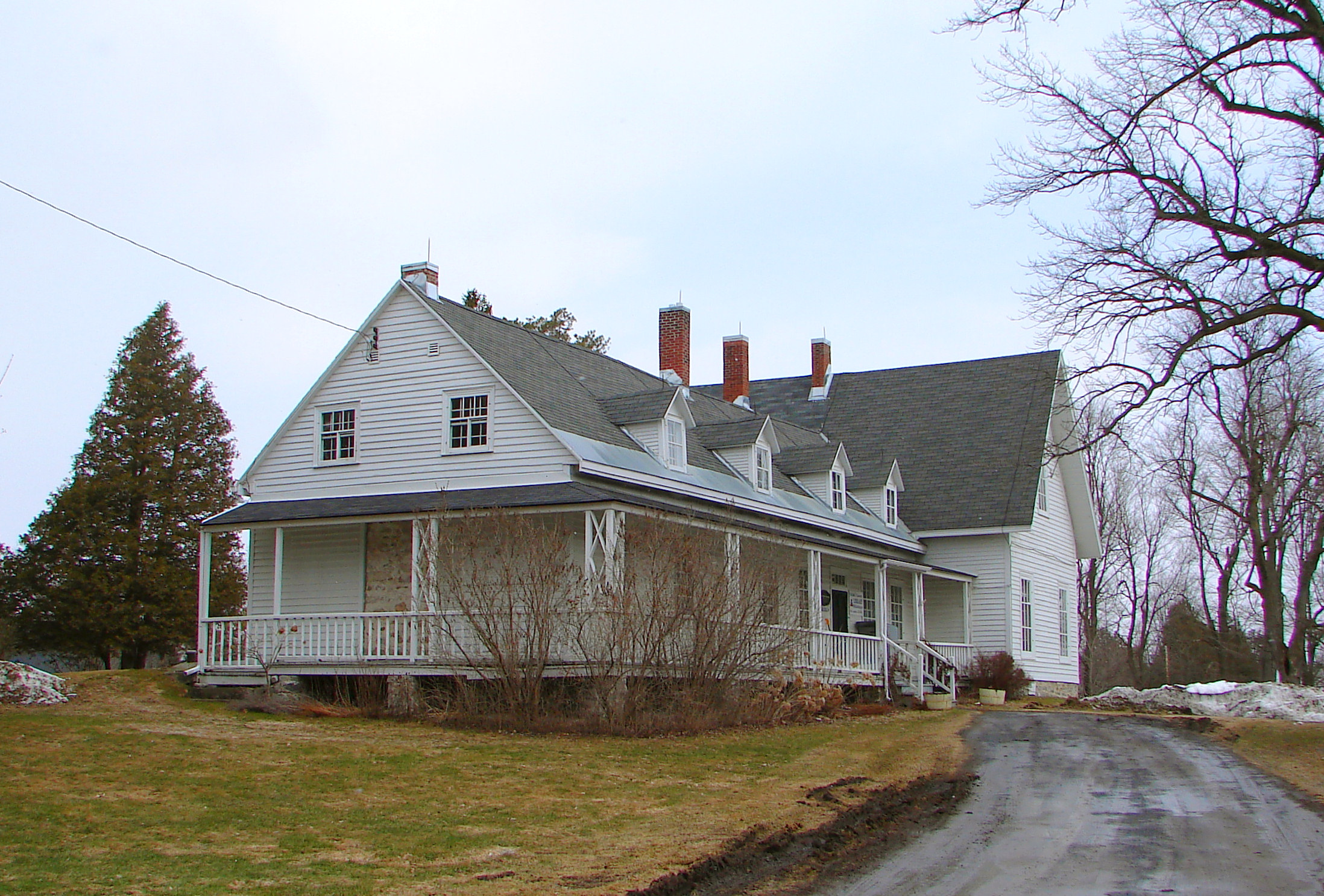
John Johnson's Manor House in Williamstown, Ontario

In 1783, the Treaty of Paris was signed, establishing the independence of the American Colonies. Johnson and thousands of other Loyalists were in permanent exile in Canada. The British had transported some Loyalists from New York and New England for resettlement to Nova Scotia, including more than 3,000 Black Loyalists: African-American slaves whom they had freed as promised for their service during the war.

In 1784, Haldimand appointed Johnson to distribute Crown lands (purchased from First Nations) along the St. Lawrence River and the north shore of Lake Ontario (what became known as Upper Canada) to Loyalists who had come to Canada, as some compensation for their losses in the colonies. The government wanted to encourage development of this part of Canada, as it was lightly settled. The exiles faced severe conditions in the early years, as they struggled to create settlements out of frontier lands, and the British were not able to get adequate supplies to them on time. Johnson estimated that he had arranged the settlement of 3,776 Loyalists during the first years. From 1787 to 1788 he worked with his subordinate at the Indian Department Colonel John Butler on the Johnson-Butler Purchase in acquiring more land east of the Toronto Purchase.

In 1791, Lord Dorchester recommended Johnson as lieutenant governor of Upper Canada, but London turned this recommendation down.

In 1796, Johnson moved back to Montreal, then the seat of government, where he served in the Legislative Council of Lower Canada and as head of the Department of Indian Affairs for Lower Canada. He owned land in both Upper and Lower Canada, including the seigneuries of Monnoir and Argenteuil in Quebec.

== Personal life ==
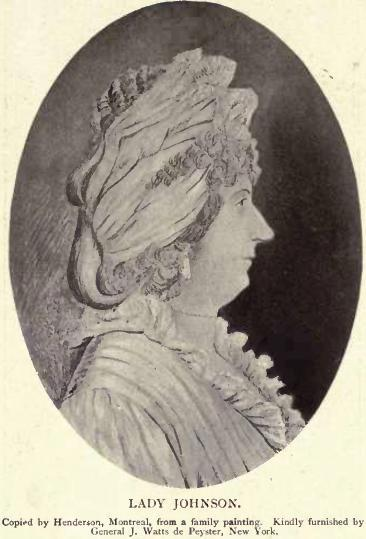
Lady Mary Johnson, copied by Henderson, of Montreal, from a family painting

From 1765 to 1773, Johnson took as a common-law wife, fifteen year old Clarissa Putman (1751–1833) of Tribes Hill, New York, daughter of Arent V. Putman and Elizabeth Peek, of Dutch and Mohawk ancestry. Before their relationship ended he married Mary Nicoll Watts. John and Clarissa were the parents of a daughter and a son:

- Margaret Johnson (1765–c. 1830), who married James Van Horne, the son of Sheriff Abraham Van Horne, in 1791.
- William Johnson (1770–1836), who was taken to Canada by Johnson where he was educated and became the lock master at The Cascades in Lower Canada.

On June 30, 1773, Johnson married Mary Nicoll "Polly" Watts (1751–1815), a daughter of Hon. John Watts, President of the King's Council, of New York. After he escaped to Canada in May 1776 at the outbreak of the American Revolutionary War, Lady Johnson was detained that year by the Whigs of New York as a hostage for the good conduct of her husband. After she was freed to join Sir John in Canada, the couple lived in Montreal during the winter and spent the summers on their seigneurie at Argenteuil, Ottawa on the Ottawa River. The couple also visited England. Together, Mary and Sir John had ten sons, eight of whom served in the British army and navy, and eight daughters, including:

- Anne Nancy Johnson (1774–1848), who married Colonel Edward MacDonnell (1766–1812), the Deputy Quartermaster General to the Forces in Canada who served as an aide-de-camp to the Duke of Wellington.
- William Johnson (1775–1811), Lieutenant Colonel in the Army, who married Sarah Delancey, granddaughter of Oliver Delancey.
- Warren Johnson (1777–1802), Major in the 60th Foot.
- Adam Gordon Johnson (1781–1843), Lieutenant Colonel of the 6th Battalion of Militia, who succeeded his father to the baronetcy.
- John Johnson of Point Olivier, Montreal (1782–1841), Colonel-Commandant of 6th Battalion of Militia, who married Mary Diana Dillon (1809–1861).
- James Stephen Johnson (1785–1812), Captain in the 28th Foot who was killed at the 1812 Siege of Badajoz.
- Catherine Maria Johnson (1786–1850), who married Major-General Barnard Foord Bowes in 1805. Bowes died at the Siege of the Salamanca Forts in 1812.
- Robert Thomas Johnson (1787–1812), Captain in the Army, who drowned in the St. Lawrence River in 1812.
- Charles Christopher Johnson (1789–1854), Lieutenant Colonel in the Army, who married Susan Griffith Colpoys, daughter of Sir Edward Griffith Colpoys.
- Their last surviving child, Marianne Johnson (1791–1868), never married. She died in London on 1 January 1868.
- Archibald Kennedy Johnson (1792–1866), who married Jenet Robertson and Maria Langham.

Lady Johnson died in Montreal on August 7, 1815. Sir John died, at the age of 88, in Montreal, while still Superintendent of Indian Affairs, on January 4, 1830. Both are buried in a vault at Mount Johnson, near Chambly, Quebec.

== Legacy and honors ==
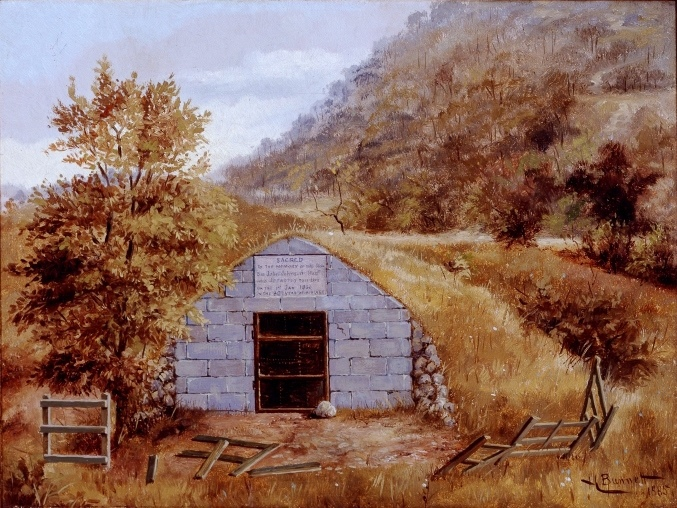
Vault Sir John Johnson, Mount Johnson, 1885

- The Sir John Johnson House in Williamstown, Ontario, was declared a National Historic Site of Canada in 1961.
- Lac Sir John, a small lake near Lakefield, Quebec (and as is the road Chemin Lac Sir John) is named after him.

Political offices
Preceded by Guy Johnson	Superintendent of Indian Affairs; 1755–1774	Succeeded by Henry Charles Darling
Baronetage of Great Britain
Preceded by William Johnson	Baronet (of New York); 1774–1830	Succeeded by Adam Gordon Johnson
