= Meat Hope =

Former Japanese meat company

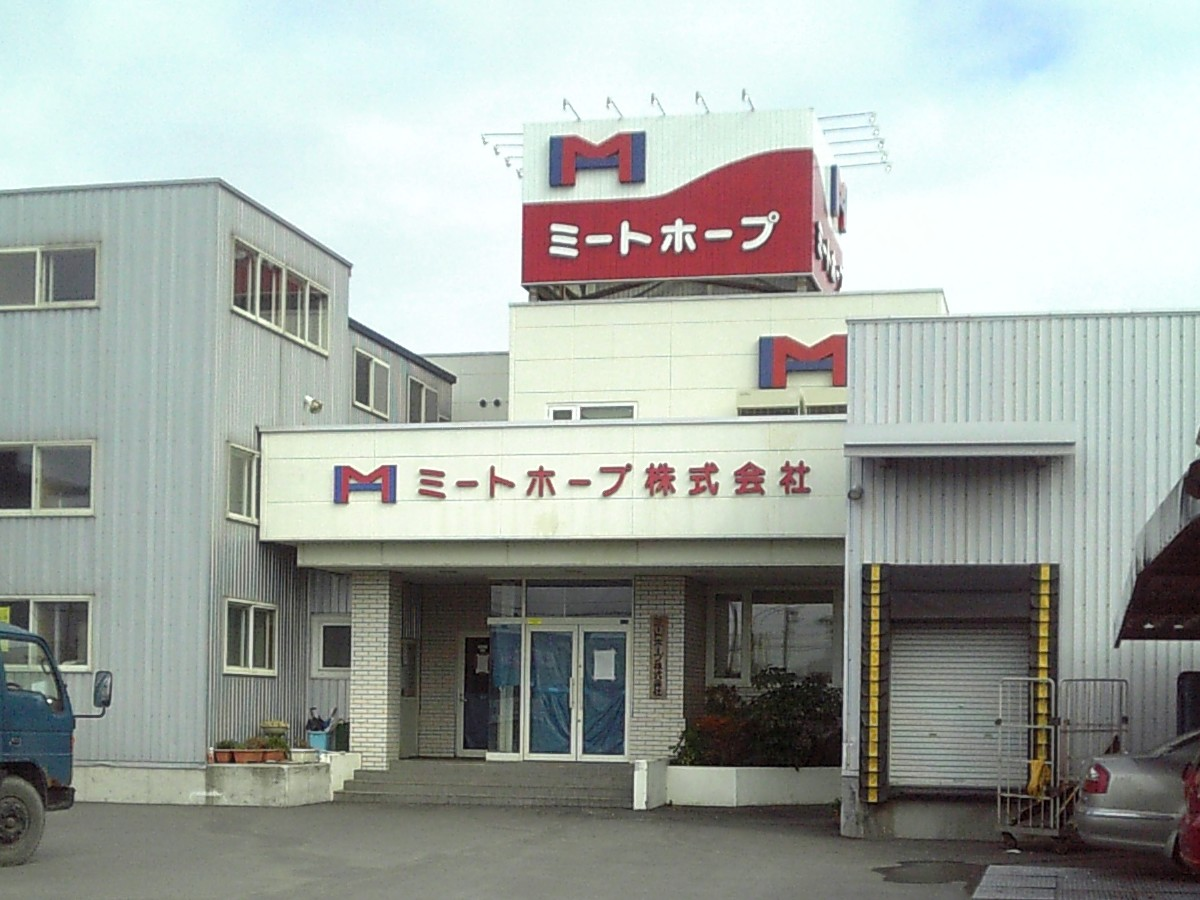
Meat Hope head office and Tomakomai plant in 2007

Meat Hope Inc. (ミートホープ株式会社, Mito Hopu Kabushiki-gaisha) was a meat processing and wholesaling company headquartered in Tomakomai, Hokkaido, Japan. It went bankrupt in 2007 after several scandals of fraudulently labeled foodstuffs, including a ground beef fraud scandal.

The fraud came to light after a former executive felt called upon to become a whistleblower. This led to the opening of Japan's Consumer Affairs Agency on September 1, 2009, a month ahead of schedule.

== Summary ==
Meat Hope was established in 1976 by Minoru Tanaka. When Tanaka, who originally worked for a different meat provider, founded his company, he originally focused on the production and supplying of meat products. During the heyday of Hokkaido's food processing wholesale industry, Meat Hope was number 1 in sales. In January 2006, they had about 100 employees and about 500 employees if including associated companies.

After graduating from junior high school, Tanaka worked his way up the corporate ladder. In doing so, he helped expand the business and grow the company. With Tanaka as the president and supported by his sons as executives and presidents of associated companies, the company was a typical family business (See also #Associated Companies).

In April 2006, a year before the ground beef fraud scandal, Tanaka was awarded the Minister of Education, Culture, Sports, Science and Technology Commendation for Innovation (he later returned the commendation). He was awarded for the development of "a processor that could uniformly mix the red meat and fat in ground beef."

However, after getting the commendation and while the fraud was being conducted, Meat Hope received an order to stop the manufacturing of char siu because they had gone over the legally designated limit of food additives allowed in the meat.

Tanaka did research on meat himself and from within the company was said to be a "genius" who knew a lot about meat. However, the reality was that in order to bring the costs down on the so-called "product development", they would mix in food additives along with other inexpensive products such as cow and pig innards, and discarded meats. The plan was to make ground meat look good through artificial means.

On June 6, 2007, the scandal over the fraudulent labeling of the quality of Meat Hope's ground beef began. With many instances of the mislabeling of food coming to light, it became impossible to continue company operations. On July 17 of the same year, Meat Hope applied for personal bankruptcy. On the same day, it was decided to commence with bankruptcy proceedings. Their total debt was about 670,000,000 yen. A meeting of Hope Meat's creditors was held on November 20 of the same year. However, among Meat Hope's client companies, one company experienced a loss adding up to tens of millions of yen. So the recovery of all of Hope Meat's debt was hopeless. On August 7, 2008, due to the lack of funds, the company was closed due to bankruptcy, i.e., it ceased to exist as a legal entity. The head office building also remained after the sale. However, since no buyers were found, it was demolished and now no longer exists.

Minoru Tanaka was arrested and prosecuted. Then on March 19, 2008, he was sentenced to prison for 4 years by the Sapporo District Court for the violation of the Unfair Competition Prevention Law. Tanaka said he wanted to atone for his crimes, so he will accept the courts verdict and not seek an appeal from the Sapporo High Court.

== The meat fraud scandal ==
=== The ground beef fraud scandal ===
The reason for Meat Hope's meat fraud whistleblowing complaint and the scandal coming to light was because of the company's managing director, Kiroku Akahane. In the continuous coverage of the Meat Hope scandal and Akahane's whistleblowing by the "Hoppo Journal", Akahane stated, "I didn't want things to end with me being just a co-conspirator."

Akahane was born in 1935 in Nagano Prefecture. After graduating from Nagano Prefecture's Kamiina Agricultural High School, he worked at the Iida branch office of Ministry of Justice's Legal Affairs Bureau. Then he joined Sankyo Seiki Manufacturing (currently known as Nidec Sankyo Corporation) at their main office in Shimosuwa, Suwa District, Nagano Prefecture. He was then put in charge of the sales department of Sankyo Shoji, an associated company of Sankyo Seiki Manufacturing (it was later merged into Nidec Sankyo). After which he became managing director for Sanwa Industries, Ltd.

In 1978, Akahane was hired as a managing director of Noboribetsu Prince Hotel, which is part of the Noguchi-Kanko Group hotel chain. He would also work as a general manager at the Tomakomai Prince Hotel and the Muroran Prince Hotel (unrelated to the Prince Hotels run by Seibu Group). In 1995, after retiring at the age of 60, Akahane was hired by Minoru Tanaka (president of Meat Hope) because of Akahane's experience managing local tourist destinations. Before his retirement in 2006, he was a managing director.

After joining Meat Hope, Akahane made use of his many connections he had made as a business executive to expand into other markets such as Honshu. His job did not bring him into the factory, so he was late to realize the ongoing food fraud. Once he knew what was actually occurring at his company, he went to Tanaka (the company's president) in an attempt to fix the situation. However, Tanaka did not heed Akahane's warnings. Moreover, since the company was run by the Tanaka family, Akahane felt it was difficult to reform the company from within. In order to fix things, Akahane hoped to improve the company through administrative guidance. He anonymously filed complaints at various administrative bodies, such as Tomakomai's Health Center, the city's school lunch center, the Ministry of Agriculture, Forestry and Fisheries (MAFF), the Hokkaido District Agriculture Office, etc. Akahane claimed that he was suffering mentally because of Tanaka's management policies and handling of the food fraud complaints. Akahane stated that in 2000 (5 years after joining the company) he began taking sleeping pills and anti-depressants.

In 2002, a local newspaper reported on a complaint of food fraud made by a former factory manager. However, the name and location of the company was not reported. And there no investigations or inquires made by any government organizations.

In April 2006, Akahane resigned from Meat Hope. After revealing his identity, he brought a sample of the fraudulently labeled ground beef to the MAFF's Hokkaido District Agriculture Office and requested an investigation. However, the Hokkaido office refused to accept the sample and Meat Hope's leaders did nothing. The MAFF later stated, "While documents confirm Akahane's visit to the Hokkaido office, there is nothing that confirms that he brought any meat for testing." The MAFF then later stated, "Because we recognize that the company is from within Hokkaido, we are requesting that the Hokkaido government take action on March 24." However, the Hokkaido Government's Department of Environment and Living replied, "There are no such records." It was unclear as to who held responsibility, the MAFF or the Hokkaido Government. However, since Meat Hope opened a Tokyo office in 2006, jurisdiction was said to fall under the MAFF.

Later, several people from the leadership ranks of Meat Hope resigned. And like Akahane, they started complaining to the news media. However, they were ignored by the Hokkaido Shimbun and the NHK.

In the spring of 2007, the Asahi Shimbun started an investigation after receiving a complaint. The results of a DNA test of a frozen beef korokke detected pork, chicken and other types of meat, proving meat fraud. Based on this investigation, the Asahi Shimbun reported on the detection of pork found in "CO-OP beef korokkes" produced by Hokkaido KaTOkichi (a consolidated subsidiary of KaTOkichi, now known as TableMark Co., Ltd.) on June 20 of the same year. KaTOkichi's own investigation reported that it was not a mistake of handling the ingredients by Hokkaido KaTOkichi, but that a person in charge at Meat Hope stated that Meat Hope "mixed pork into the beef paid for" by Hokkaido KaTOkichi.

At a Meat Hope press conference, the company president emphasized meat fraud was an "accident" and not done "intentionally." However, at the urging the eldest son of the company director, he appeared on TV in which he admitted to personally participating in the meat fraud. At this time, Meat Hope's president had a paper that calculated the costs of mixing the meat.

Later, outside of mixing substances like pork, chicken, pork innards and bread scraps into the ground meat that was labeled as "100% Beef" in order to dilute the amount of beef, Meat Hope was shown to have blood mixed in to adjust the ground meat's color and flavor enhancements mixed in to adjust the flavor.

Furthermore, Meat Hope was found to have used meat beyond its expiration date and meat that had been returned by customers because of some complaint or another; changed the label of damaged or contaminated meat and ship it out to customers; mixed already stinking rotting meat into other offal and making things such as restructured steak; imported poultry meat from Brazil, labeled it as "domestic poultry" and supplied it to organizations such as the Japan Self-Defense Forces; falsified the data showing salmonella was found in sausages and then supplied said sausages to school lunch firms that provide lunch for elementary and junior high schools; used rain water to thaw out frozen meats; and many other dishonest acts of Meat Hope came to light.

On June 24, 2007, the Hokkaido police carried out a search of Meat Hope's main office as well as 10 other locations under the suspicion of violating Japan's Unfair Competition Prevention Law (false labeling).

Meat Hope's president continued to pass the blame to others in statements given to the media and at the public trial. He said things such as "Even the customers who are happy with the half-off sale have complaints about the products" and "Because we cannot increase the price on our business customers, we chose to continue our business practices [of mixing in other substances to keep costs down]." On the other hand, he did apologize for making people worried about their food.

=== Impact on business clients ===
According to the MAFF investigation, from July 2006 to June 2007, Meat Hope distributed a total of 9,838 tons of ground beef to general customers (4,300 tons), business clients (5,504 tons) and specialty facilities (34 tons).

- KaTOkichi – A total of 20 kinds of korokke were recalled for using ingredients bought from Meat Hope.
  - An investigation showed that Hokkaido KaTOkichi's plant manager illegally sold to Meat Hope frozen korokkes that were intended to be thrown out. Which in turn brought in somewhere between 200,000 and 300,000 yen in illegal profits. It was said that these earnings were used for the purpose of strengthening ties within the company and were not recorded in the company's profits. Because of this scandal, the parent company KaTOkichi dismissed Hokkaido KaTOkichi's plant manager.
  - Furthermore, the founder of KaTOkichi, Katou Yoshikazu, stepped down from the board of the Japan Business Federation and other public offices outside of the company.
- Japanese Consumers' Co-operative Union – Pork was mixed into 23 products designated as beef.
- Japan Tobacco – Voluntary recall of a total of 6 kinds of frozen korokke that used ground beef.
- Mister Donut – Due to the buying of bacon from Meat Hope, they stopped selling soup.
- AEON – Sales of the ready-made beef korokke suspended.
- The city of Tomakomai's public elementary and junior high school lunches – Brazilian made poultry was fraudulently labeled as Japanese made. Also, bacteria such as salmonella detected in hams and sausages delivered to the lunch center.
- Additionally, Meat Hope sold 14 tons of ground meat for school lunches in 22 Japanese prefectures.

=== Impact on the whistleblower ===
All this information came from whistleblowing. Which in turn created a bit of a stir in the then current state of the whistleblower system. Furthermore, Japan passed the Whistleblower Protection Act on April 1, 2006. At about the same time, Akahane resigned from Meat Hope and began revealing what was going on at Meat Hope under his real name.

However, a deep scar remained in the whistleblower Akahane. In 2010, Akahane published "I Will Not Stop Pointing the Finger – The Truth of the Meat Hope Scandal" through the publishing company Nagasaki Shuppan KK. In the book he wrote of the pain he still felt in his heart, "I never thought I would still be feeling it today."

After the scandal was proven to be true, Akahane was put directly into the public eye by the mass media. He felt horrible that his family and relatives were being dragged along with him. During the time he was fervently trying to bring to light what had occurred at Meat Hope, the mass media ignored him. However, due to the reporting by Asahi Shimbun which shed light on the scandal, the new media came upon him uninvited. Moreover, without asking or confirming with Akahane, the media would write stories about Akahane's personal life. He said he felt they were "rude in how they caused [him] trouble."

Akahane, who was forced to struggle on alone, was criticized by a former client who said, "Did he [Akahane] push us meat products while knowing they were fraudulent?" Memories of the scandal and losing contact with his former Meat Hope co-workers is painful for Akahane. Being in the public eye caused him to suffer from sleeplessness and bipolar disorder. His wife divorced him and his relatives stated they wanted nothing to do with him. He left Tomakomai, where he lived, and lives by himself in his childhood home in Nagano Prefecture.

In 2017, ten years after the scandal, Akahane told Yahoo! News, "If I could go back to that time, I would not blow the whistle on Meat Hope." He said, "Whistleblowing ruins a person. You may be turning a blind-eye to what's going on, but if you don't like it, then just keep quiet and just quit. Even if blowing the whistle is to protect other people or to protect the world, if you cannot protect yourself, there is no point." and "Because I spoke up, I became bipolar and I no longer see my family or friends. And because my name was spread around by the mass media, it caused trouble for my siblings." He also expressed his resent when he said, "If the government or the media had just done something when I had reported on Meat Hope anonymously, I wouldn't have had to reveal my name. I wouldn't have gotten a mental disorder. I wouldn't have lost everything."

As to the failure to act sooner by the relevant authorities, Akahane has repeatedly spoken to many sources including Hoppo Journal since the scandal came to light in 2008. He has said, "If the authorities had done something sooner, the business could have been improved. Without sending the company president Tanaka to prison, without the company going into bankruptcy, and without my losing my job."

Akahane says that he no longer reads his own book. Yasuko Jikumaru, a journalist who helped Akahane write his book, concluded his book by saying, "While he is a whistleblower who brought about definite change in food safety, he feels that the day when everyone praises people like him will probably never come. The day when he finally feels at peace will probably never come."

Similarly to Akahane's situation, a whistleblower from warehouser Nishinomiya Reizo brought light to a scandal involving the warehouser's client company Snow Brand. During the 2001 mad cow disease outbreak, Snow Brand fraudulently labeled Australian beef as Japanese beef.

== Associated companies ==
- Eat-Up Inc. (Est. November 1995. Official Japanese Website)
  - Head Office: 1-5-14, Yanagi-cho, Tomakomai, Hokkaido (same address as their Tomakomai branch restaurant)
  - Eat-Up Inc. manages the yakiniku and shabu-shabu all-you-can-eat Eat-Up restaurant chain (Tomakomai branch, Chitose branch, and Iwamizawa branch)
  - Eat-Up Inc. was once a consolidated subsidiary of Meat Hope. It is managed by the eldest son of Meat Hope's former president Tanaka. As of 2020, it is still in operation.
- Barusu Meat Inc. (Est. July 1991)
  - Head office: 4-11-26, Tokai-cho, Tomakomai, Hokkaido
  - Barusu Meat Inc. was once a consolidated subsidiary of Meat Hope. It was managed by the second son of Meat Hope's former president Tanaka.

Also, 5 of the 70 former Meat Hope employees got together and started selling "Honest Korokke" in April 2008.

== See also ==
- Restructured steak
- Whistleblower
- Consumer Affairs Agency

== Bibliography ==
Books

- Akahane, Kiroku; Jikumaru, Yasuko (2010). 告発は終わらない [I Will Not Stop Pointing the Finger] (Japanese Book) (in Japanese). Nagasaki Shuppan KK. ISBN 978-4-86095-377-5.

Magazines

- "「ミートホープ事件」の真相を追う（3）告発者が実名で苦悩を激白!「私は偽装の片棒を担いだまま終われなかった」動かなかった行政に今も残る憤り" [Pursuing the Truth of the "Meat Hope Scandal" (3) The whistleblower reveals the suffering he has endured because of revealing his real name! "I couldn't end things with me being just an accomplice." Even now his resentment at the government that did nothing remains]. Hoppo Journal (in Japanese). Vol. 2008, no. January.
- "「ミートホープ事件」の真相を追う（4）元常務が保健所・農政事務所を直撃!「あなた方は監督責任を果たしたと言えるのか？」内部告発者の闘い、第二幕へ" [Pursuing the Truth of the "Meat Hope Scandal" (4) The former managing director of Meat Hope attacks the Health and Agriculture Office! "Can you say you really did your job as a watchdog?" The Fight of the Whistleblower, Act 2]. Hoppo Journal (in Japanese). Vol. 2008, no. February.
- "「ミートホープ事件」の真相を追う（5）開始された公判と元常務の終わりなき告発「田中元社長を裁くなら北海道も国も裁け!」" [Pursuing the Truth of the "Meat Hope Scandal" (5) The start of the trial and the former managing directors never ending accusations. "If you are going to judge former president Mr. Tanaka, then you must judge Hokkaido and the whole country as well!"]. Hoppo Journal (in Japanese). Vol. 2008, no. March.
- "「ミートホープ事件」の真相を追う（6）判決直前レポート「求刑懲役6年」の重みと不毛／緊急再録―"食肉偽装"の軌跡／ミートホープ事件の深い闇 元常務が問い続ける所轄庁の監督責任" [Pursuing the Truth of the "Meat Hope Scandal" (6) A Pre-Sentencing Report On: The importance and fruitlessness of the "6 years prison sentence recommendation" / Urgent Recap – The "Meat Fraud" Case / The Dark Depths of the Meat Hope Scandal – Former managing director continues to question the responsibility to keep watch by the government]. Hoppo Journal (in Japanese). Vol. 2008, no. April.
- "「ミートホープ事件」の真相を追う（7）田中稔元社長実刑判決で何が変わり、終わったか／渦中の赤羽喜六氏が吐露する「むなしさ」" [Pursuing the Truth of the "Meat Hope Scandal" (7) With the sentencing of Meat Hope's former president Minoru Tanaka, what changes? Is it really over? / In the midst of his own turmoil, Mr. Kiroku Akahane speaks out. "It was pointless."]. Hoppo Journal (in Japanese). Vol. 2008, no. May.

Newspaper Articles

- "コロッケに偽ミンチ、生協が全国販売 北海道の業者出荷" [Fraudulent Ground Meat Shipped from Hokkaido Manufacturer Sold by Co-op Stores Nationwide]. Asahi Shimbun. 2007-06-20.
- "偽ミンチ、内部告発を１年余放置 農政事務所" [Office of Agriculture Ignored Fraudulent Ground Beef Whistleblower for Over One Year]. Asahi Shimbun. 2007-06-21.

Documentary Programs

- "The Man Who Blew the Whistle on 'Food Fraud'". A Singular Rebellion (in Japanese). 1 December 2009. Event occurs at 10:00pm-10:45pm. NHK General TV.
- "The Environment and Fraud – 3 Hour Special". The World's Astonishing News! (in Japanese). 1 June 2011. Event occurs at 7:00pm-9:54pm. Nippon Television Holdings. Archived from the original on 2011-06-26.

Government Reports

- Follow-up Survey of Ground Beef and Other Ground Meats in Regards to the Ground Beef Case as well as Future Measures (Report) (in Japanese). Ministry of Agriculture, Forestry and Fisheries. 2007-09-07. Archived from the original on 2013-01-21.（）
- All Facts Pertaining to "Ground Beef" Case as well as Investigative Report on Plans for Improvement in Future (PDF) (Report) (in Japanese). Ministry of Agriculture, Forestry and Fisheries. 2007-07-06. Archived from the original (PDF) on 2021-09-08.
- Shinzo Abe (2007-07-08). Report Filed by Lower House Member Seiji Osaka in Regards to Questions Related to the Case of Processed Meat Fraud by the Meat Processing Company "Meat Hope Inc." (Report) (in Japanese).
