= High Sheriff of Queen's County =

The High Sheriff of Queen's County was the British Crown's judicial representative in Queen's County, Ireland (now County Laois), Ireland from the 16th century until 1922, when the office was abolished in the new Free State and replaced by the office of Offaly County Sheriff. The sheriff had judicial, electoral, ceremonial and administrative functions and executed High Court Writs. In 1908, an Order in Council made the Lord-Lieutenant the Sovereign's prime representative in a county and reduced the High Sheriff's precedence. However, the sheriff retained his responsibilities for the preservation of law and order in the county. The usual procedure for appointing the sheriff from 1660 onwards was that three persons were nominated at the beginning of each year from the county and the Lord Lieutenant then appointed his choice as High Sheriff for the remainder of the year. Often the other nominees were appointed as under-sheriffs. Sometimes a sheriff did not fulfil his entire term through death or other event and another sheriff was then appointed for the remainder of the year. The dates given hereunder are the dates of appointment. All addresses are in Queen's County (County Laois) unless stated otherwise.

== High Sheriffs of Queen's County ==
- 1579: Robert Bowen of Ballyadams
- 1593: Terence O'Dempsey, 1st Viscount Clanmalier
- 1623: Barnaby or Brian Oge Dunn of Brittas
- 1627: Sir Walter Crosbie, 1st Baronet
- 1637: Gerald Fitzgerald of Tymogue and Moret and Loughcurran
- 1639: Edward Brereton
- 1663: Thomas Pigott of Capard
- 1676: Samuel Preston of Emo
- 1677: Edward Brereton
- 1689: Sir Gregory Byrne, 1st Baronet
- 1704: Gerald Fitzgerald of Coolanowle
- 1712: Robert Pigott of Capard
- 1719: Edmond Butler
- 1732: Lewis Moore I
- 1736: Lewis Moore of Cremorgan
- 1753: Sir John Parnell

== George III, 1760–1820 ==
- 1760: Lewis Moore II of Durrow
- 1763: Stephen Cassan of Sheffield House
- 1764:
- 1772: Richard Croasdaile of Rynn
- 1773:
- 1779: Stewart Weldon
- 1780: John Brereton
- 1782: Jonathan Chetwode of Woodbrook
- 1782: John Adair of Rath
- 1783: Matthew Cassan of Sheffield House
- 1784: Henry Moore of Cremorgan
- 1785: Thomas Fitz-Gerald of Corbolly
- 1786:
- 1787:
- 1790: Edward Dunne of Brittas
- 1791: Charles Henry Coote of Forest Lodge
- 1792: Sir John Allen Johnson, 1st Baronet, later Sir John Allen Johnson-Walsh, 1st Baronet
- 1794: John or George Hartpole
- 1795: Joshua Kemmis of Knightstown
- 1799: Thomas Murray Prior (1773–1854)
- 1800: Sir Erasmus Dixon Borrowes, 6th Baronet
- 1801: Richard Warburton of Garryhinch
- 1802:
- 1804: Coghran Palmer
- 1805: John Bland
- 1806: Robert Laurenson
- 1807: Gilbert fitz Gerald
- 1808: Sir George Pigott
- 1809: Thomas Cosby of Stradbally Hall
- 1810: Frederick Thompson
- 1811: Lancelot Croasdaile of Rynn
- 1812: John Alien Johnston-Walsh
- 1813: Hon Lord Sidney Osborne
- 1814: Lord Henry Seymour Moore
- 1815: Charles White of Charleville
- 1816: James White of Aghavoe
- 1817: Sir Walter Dixon Borrowes, 7th Baronet
- 1818: Robert White of Old Park (Grantston Manor)
- 1819: Sir Robert Staples
- 1820: Hugh Aldborough-Bowen

== George IV, 1820–1830 ==
- 1821: Pierce Moore
- 1822: George Adair of Rath
- 1823: Hon. Lionel Dawson
- 1824: Henry Smith, of Mount Henry
- 1825: Edward John Johnson-Walsh, later Sir Edward Johnson-Walsh, 2nd Baronet of Ballykilcavan.
- 1827: Hon. John Vesey, of Abbeyleix
- 1828: Lewis Moore III
- 1829: John Warburton of Garryhinch

== William IV, 1830–1837 ==
- 1831: William Cope Cooper of Cooper's Hill
- 1832: Thomas Kemmis of Shaen Castle and Straboe
- 1834: Thomas Phillips Cosby of Stradbally Hall
- 1835: John Pigott of Cappard, Mountmellick
- 1836: John Fitzpatrick, 1st Baron Castletown of Upper Ossory

== Victoria, 1837–1901 ==
- 1839: Sir Anthony Weldon, 4th Baronet of Rahan, Ballylinan
- 1842: Edmund Staples of Dunmore
- 1843: Matthew Sheffield Cassan of Sheffield House
- 1845: Horace William Noel Rochfort, of Clogrenan
- 1846: Chidley Coote of Huntingdon, Portarlington
- 1848: J.H. Leckie of Coolbrook, Creetyard
- 1849: Richard Warburton of Garryhinch, Portarlington
- 1850: Henry D. Carden of Rathmanna, Maryborough
- 1852: William Gilbert Kemmis of Ballinacor
- 1852: Michael James Sweetman of Lamberton Park
- 1854: John Allen Johnson-Walsh, later Sir (John) Allen Johnson-Walsh, 4th Baronet
- 1855: John Croasdaile of Rynn
- 1856: Henry Jeffrey Flower, 6th Viscount Ashbrook
- 1857: James Butler of Lamberton Park
- 1858: John Grace of Gracefield, Athy
- 1859: Edmund Gerald Dease of Rath House
- 1860: Thomas Kemmis of Shaen
- 1861: Sir Anthony Crossdill Weldon, 5th Baronet
- 1862: M.J.Sweetman of Lamberton Park, Maryborough
- 1863: Robert Ashworth Godolphin Cosby of Stradbally Hall
- 1865: Edward Skeffington Randal Smyth of Mount Henry
- 1869: Richard Warburton of Garryhinch
- 1870: James W. Butler Scott of Annegrove Abbey, Mountrath
- 1871: Mathew Villiers Sankey Morton of Little Island, County Tipperary
- 1873: Robert Hamilton Hamilton-Stubber of Moyne and Castle Fleming
- 1875: William Young
- 1876: Bernard Edward Barnaby Fitzpatrick, 2nd Baron Castletown of Upper Ossory
- 1877:
- 1878: Francis Plunkett Dunne of Brittas
- 1880: Sir Erasmus Dixon Borrowes, 9th Baronet
- 1881: William Duckett of Duckett's Grove
- 1882: Robert Edward Reeves of Morenane, County Limerick, and Skeard, County Kilkenny
- 1883: Henry Moore of Cremorgan
- 1884: John Michael Sweetman-Powell of Lamberton Park
- 1886: Eyre Coote
- 1886: William Gilbert of Killeen, Portarlington
- 1888: Sir Robert Edward Pigott of Capard
- 1889:
- 1891: Sir Hutcheson Poë, 1st Baronet of Heywood, Ballinakill
- 1892: Sir Percy Raymond Grace, 4th Baronet of Boley
- 1893: Standish Grady John Parker-Hutchinson of Timoney Park and Castle Lough, County Tipperary
- 1895: Charles Joseph Blake
- 1897: Sir Algernon Coote, 11th Baronet.
- 1900: Sir Hunt Henry Allen Johnson-Walsh, 5th Baronet

== Edward VII, 1901–1910 ==
- 1902: Matthew Henry Franks of Westfield
- 1904: Joseph Henry Lachlan White of Gracefield
- 1905: Henry Charles White of Charleville
- 1906: Sir Anthony Arthur Weldon, 6th Baronet
- 1907: Sir Valentine Raymond Grace, 5th Baronet
- 1908: Robert F.H. White
- 1909: William Hovenden Ffolliott of Tierernane Lodge

== George V, 1910–1936 ==
- 1910:
- 1911: Leigh Sadleir Stoney of Forrest
- 1912: Humphrey Loftus Bland of Blandsfort
- 1913:
- 1920: Llowarch Robert Flower, 9th Viscount Ashbrook of Castle Durrow
- 1921: Isidore Blake
