= William Coleman (judge) =

American judge

- Born: 1704; Philadelphia, Pennsylvania
- Died: January 11, 1769 (aged 64–65); Philadelphia, Pennsylvania
- Occupations: Merchant, lawyer and judge in colonial Pennsylvania
- Notable work: Helped to found the College of Philadelphia (now the University of Pennsylvania)
- Office: Founding Member, American Philosophical Society, First Treasurer of the American Philosophical Society (1743-1744)

William Coleman (1704 – January 11, 1769) was a merchant, lawyer, municipal official, and judge in colonial Philadelphia.

Coleman was born in Philadelphia, where he was educated and studied law. His parents were Quakers; his mother, Rebecca Bradford, had arrived in the new colony of Pennsylvania as a child in 1683, and his father, also William Coleman, was a carpenter and one of the earliest members of the Carpenter's Company of Philadelphia.

After he was admitted to the bar, Coleman held a variety of municipal offices, beginning as Town Clerk and Clerk of the City Court. He became a Judge of various local courts including the Orphan's Court, Court of Common Pleas, and Quarter Sessions. In 1758 he was appointed an associate justice of the Supreme Court of Pennsylvania. He was also a merchant, in partnership with Thomas Hopkinson. He was also active in Philadelphia's emerging cultural institutions. By 1727 Coleman was a friend of Benjamin Franklin and member of Franklin's Junto. He was a founder and first treasurer of the American Philosophical Society, one of the first directors of the Philadelphia Contributionship, and an early supporter of Pennsylvania Hospital.

Benjamin Franklin was a close friend of Colman, and said of him, "He has the coolest, clearest head, the best heart, and the best morals of almost any man I ever met."

Coleman was also a founder of the College of Philadelphia (now the University of Pennsylvania, serving as the original clerk of the Board of Trustees, 1749–1755, and as its first treasurer, 1749–1764.

In 1738, William Coleman married Hannah Fitzwater, daughter of George Fitzwater, a successful merchant and landowner. The couple was childless, but Coleman adopted his nephew, George Clymer, son of Hannah's sister Deborah and Captain Christopher Clymer, a sea captain and privateer.

In 1747, Coleman joined with other Philadelphia merchants to fit out a privateer, The Warren, to defend the Delaware River and Bay from Spanish and French pirates, who had been carrying off slaves and other property in the bay and river. The Philadelphia Friends Meeting considered this incompatible with the Meeting's pacifist beliefs and read Coleman out of the Meeting. Subsequently, Coleman joined with Franklin to help manage a public lottery held in 1748 to raise funds to cover the costs of building Philadelphia's first military defense, the Association Battery.

In 1756, William Coleman purchased 12 acres of land along the Schuylkill River, where he built an elegant country home which he named Woodford.

In 1761, Coleman was appointed to serve as one of the Pennsylvania Members of the Commission formed to adjust the disputed boundary between Pennsylvania and Maryland. English surveyors Charles Mason and Jeremiah Dixon were engaged to record the boundary, now known as the Mason-Dixon line, and the Commission certified their map of the boundary line in 1768.

He died in Philadelphia on January 11, 1769.
