= Johnson-Walsh baronets =

Extinct baronetcy in the Baronetage of Ireland

The Johnson-Walsh Baronetcy, of Ballykilcavan, Queen's County, was a title in the Baronetage of Ireland. It was created on 24 February 1775 for John Allen Johnson, who changed his name by royal licence in 1809 to John Allen Johnson-Walsh. He was the elder brother of Sir Henry Johnson, 1st Baronet, of Bath He was Member of the Irish Parliament for Baltinglass from 1784 to 1790, and High Sheriff of Queen's County for 1792.

The title became extinct on the death of the 5th Baronet in 1953.

== Johnson-Walsh baronets, of Ballykilcavan (1775) ==
- Sir John Allen Johnson-Walsh, 1st Baronet (c. 1745–1831)
- Sir Edward John Johnson-Walsh, 2nd Baronet (c. 1785–1848)
- Sir Hunt Henry Johnson-Walsh, 3rd Baronet (1787–1865)
- Sir John Allen Johnson-Walsh, 4th Baronet (1829–1893)
- Sir Hunt Henry Allen Johnson-Walsh, 5th Baronet (1864–1953)

Coat of arms of Johnson-Walsh of Ballykilcavan
Crest 1st, A griffin’s head erased Argent, langued gules (Walsh); 2nd, A tower Argent, thereon a cock Gules, langued Azure (Johnson). Escutcheon Quarterly : 1st and 4th: Argent, a fesse azure between six martles Sable ; 2nd and 3rd: Sable, on a saltire Argent, between three towers or in flames Proper, one in chief and one on each side, and in base two tilting spears in saltire Proper, five cocks Gules.

== See also ==
- Johnson baronets
