= Japanese Consumers' Co-operative Union =

National federation of consumer cooperatives

The Japanese Consumers' Cooperative Union (日本生活協同組合連合会, Nihon Seikatsu Kyōdō Kumiai Rengōkai; or JCCU) is a national federation of consumer cooperatives that represents and serves consumer cooperative societies all throughout Japan. Its main operation is to supply food and other daily necessities to its members through store operations and home delivery services. Currently, its mission statement, “Ideals of the 21st Century,” is to create a more humane and sustainable society through the efforts of the cooperative members in the form of business operations and through their involvement with the community

== History of Consumer Cooperatives in Japan ==
Cooperative societies in Japan were initiated during the era of Taishō democracy. In 1900, the Industrial Association Law was enacted and under its provisions consumer cooperatives like Nada Consumer Cooperative and Kobe Consumer Cooperative were formed. During the Shōwa period, cooperative movements came to a halt due to the increase economic control of the government and the compulsory military drafts for war. At the end of WWII in 1945, severe food shortages and inflation stimulated the growth and expansion of cooperatives once again. In 1948, the Consumer Cooperative Law replaced the Industrial Association Law of 1900 which provided limitations on the operation of consumer cooperative societies within prefectures and prevented the merger of cooperatives across prefecture borders. In 1951, Toyohiko Kagawa founded the Japanese Consumers' Cooperative Union, or JCCU, which was established to represent and serve all the consumers' cooperative societies of Japan.

== Membership ==
Following the 1948 Consumer Cooperative Law, individuals are only allowed to join consumer cooperative societies in the prefecture in which they resided. In addition, membership comes through the payment of a subscription, which is used for business operations. Whenever a member decides to leave the total amount of their investments are returned.

== Businesses ==
=== Retailing ===
These consumer cooperative societies consist of store operation, home delivery, catalog, and internet businesses. All which are involved with the sale of food and other necessities to its members.

=== Insurance Cooperatives ===
These cooperatives offer life and other insurance products that suit the members' needs. The two insurance cooperatives under the JCCU include Japan CO-OP Insurance Consumers' Cooperative Federation (JCIF) and National Federation of Workers and Consumers Insurance Cooperative (ZENROSAI).

=== Coop Sanchoku ===
This cooperative society follows the community-supported agriculture philosophy developed by the Japanese Consumer Cooperative in the early 1970s. They promote safe food production and address agricultural problems from urbanization by creating good quality and safe products. They continue to adapt their products based on the responses of society and the lifestyle of the consumers.

== Involvement with the Community ==
Cooperative members are involved in the community through their social activities. These include social care, pursuing food safety, providing dietary education, child-rearing support, and peace actions.
