= Sir William Johnson, 4th Baronet =

Sir William Johnson Bt
- Born: William George Johnson; 19 December 1830; Montreal, Canada
- Died: 26 January 1908 (aged 77); Nice, France
- Education: Royal Military Academy, Woolwich
- Spouse: Elizabeth Hancock Brown (m. 1889)
- Parent(s): John Johnson; Mary Diana Dillon
- Relatives: Sir John Johnson, 2nd Baronet (grandfather)

Sir William George Johnson, 4th Baronet (19 December 1830 – 26 January 1908) was a British Army officer.

== Early life ==
Johnson was born on 19 December 1830 at Point Olivier in Montreal, Canada. He was the son of John Johnson (1782–1841) and Mary Diana Dillon (1809–1861).

His father was the sixth son of his grandparents Sir John Johnson, 2nd Baronet, a Loyalist leader during the American Revolution, and his wife, Mary Nicoll "Polly" Watts, daughter of John Watts, President of the King's Council, of New York and descendant of the Schuyler, Van Cortlandt and Delancey families. Among his prominent extended family was uncle Major-General Barnard Foord Bowes, the husband of his aunt Catherine Maria Johnson.

Upon the death of his uncle, Adam Gordon Johnson, who died on May 21, 1843, without male issue, young William became the 4th Baronet Johnson and heir to the Johnson estate.

== Career ==
After graduating from the Royal Military Academy, Woolwich, he spent the greater part of his life engaged in the British Army, serving various duties, including as the aide-de-camp to the Governor on the Island of Saint Helena, after it became a crown colony in 1834. From 1848, until his resignation in 1854, he was a lieutenant of Royal Artillery. Thereafter, he was a lieutenant in the Falmouth Division of Royal Engineers.

== Personal life ==
On 30 March 1889, Sir William was married to Elizabeth Hancock Brown (d. 1932), the only daughter of Richard Hancock Brown of Bowdon, county of Chester in England.

He died, without issue, on 26 January 1908. His nephew Edward Gordon Johnson (1867–1957), son of his younger brother Archibald Kennedy Johnson (1839–1873) (named after his grandfather's brother-in-law, Archibald Kennedy, 11th Earl of Cassilis), and Catherine Sophia (née MacDonnell) Johnson, succeeded him in the baronetcy.

== Bibliography ==
=== References ===
- Browning, Charles Henry (1883). Americans of Royal Descent. Philadelphia: Porter & Costes. p. 16.
- Dod, Charles Roger Phipps (1793–1855); Dod, Robert Phipps (c.1822–1865) (1841–1960). The Peerage, Baronetage, Knightage, of Great Britain and Ireland, Including All the Titled Classes. Retrieved August 7, 2019. LCCN sv87-62818; OCLC 6308211 (all editions), OCLC 124051820 (all editions).
1. ↓ Title → Dod's Peerage, Baronetage, Knightage, etc. of Great Britain and Ireland; Including Bishops, Members of the Privy Councils, Companions of All Orders, etc.
2. ↓ Publisher → London: Proprietors Dod's Peerage, Limited 12, Mitre Court Chambers, Temple, E.C. By Simpkin, Marshall, Hamilton, Kent & Co., Ltd.
3. Vol. 68 (in 2 parts). 1908.
  1. Part 1. p. 564 – via Internet Archive (Allen County Public Library).
  2. Part 1. p. 564 – via Internet Archive (Allen County Public Library).
  3. Part 1. p. 564 – via Google Books (Harvard).
  4. Part 2 – via Internet Archive (Allen County Public Library).
- Debrett, John (1753–1822). Courthope, William (1808–1866) (ed.). Debrett's Baronetage of England; With Alphabetical Lists of Such Baronetcies as Have Merged in the Peerage, or Have Become Extinct, and Also of the Existing Baronets of Nova Scotia and Ireland. Including The New Baronets Created at Her Majesty's Coronation in 1839, With The Arms Complete, From Drawings by Harvey (7th ed.). London: J. G. & F. Rivington. p. 176. Retrieved August 7, 2019.
1. Via Google Books (Oxford) (7th ed.). 1839. p. 139.
- Johnson, William; Sullivan, James; Flick, Alexander Clarence; Lauber, Almon W.; Hamilton, Milton Wheaton; Corey, Albert Bickmore (1965). The Papers of Sir William Johnson. Albany: University of the State of New York at Albany. pp. xlii–xliii – via Internet Archive (Robarts Library).

Baronetage of Great Britain
Preceded by Adam Gordon Johnson	Baronet (of New York); 1843–1908	Succeeded by Edward Gordon Johnson
