= Mischianza =

1778 festival

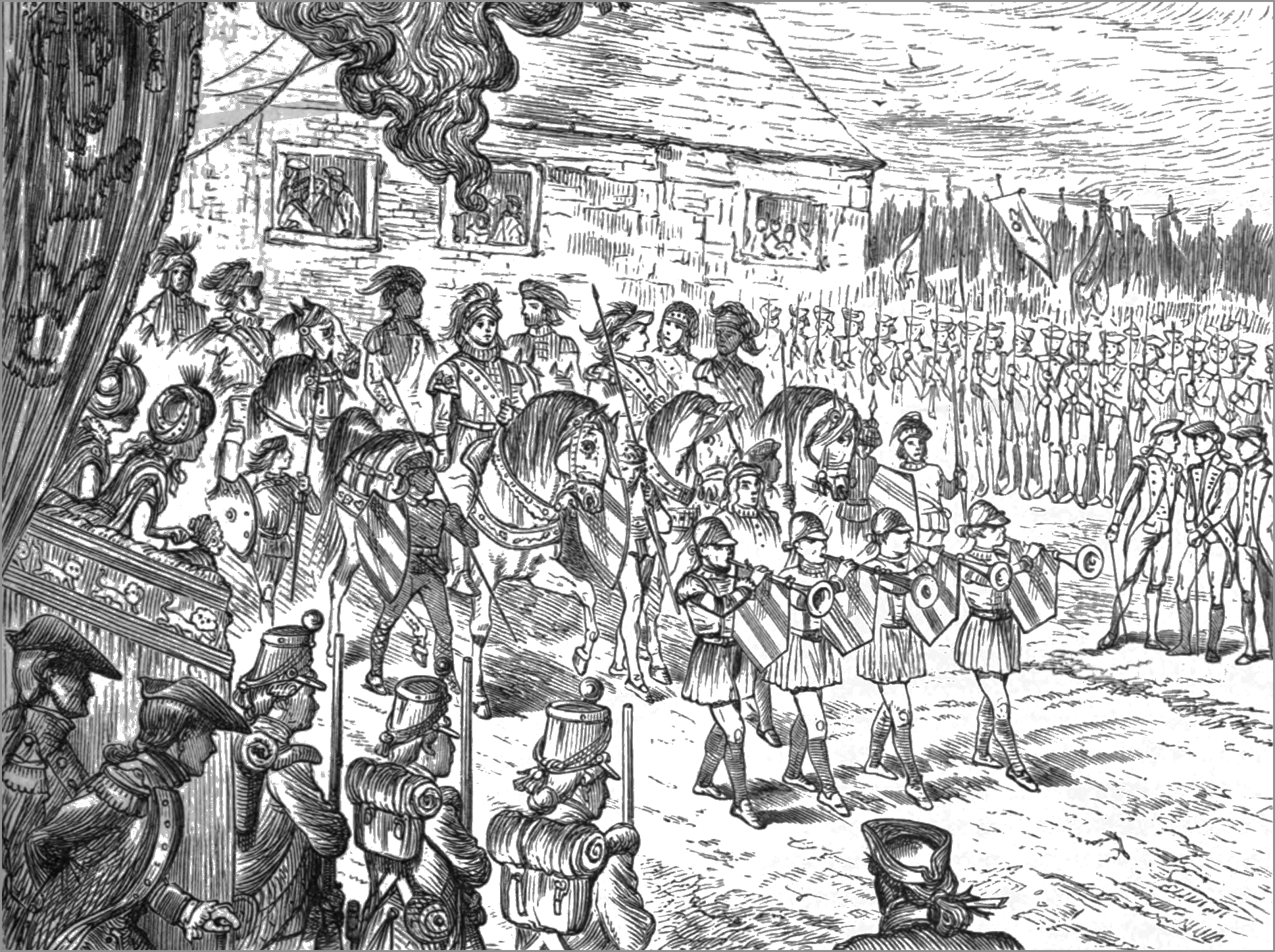
The Meschianza procession, 1876, Century illustrated, volume 12

The Mischianza (pronounced [miˈskjantsa]; Italian for "medley" or "mixture"), or Meschianza, was an elaborate fête given in honor of British General Sir William Howe in Philadelphia on May 18, 1778.

Howe, the commander-in-chief of the British forces in America during the early years of the Revolution, had resigned his post and was about to return to England. The ball was thrown by his corps of officers, who put up a sum of 3,312 guineas to pay for it. The events, which were planned by Captains John André and John Montresor and others, included a regatta along the Delaware River, accompanied by three musical bands and a 17-gun salute by British warships, a procession, a tournament of jousting knights, and a ball and banquet with fireworks display.

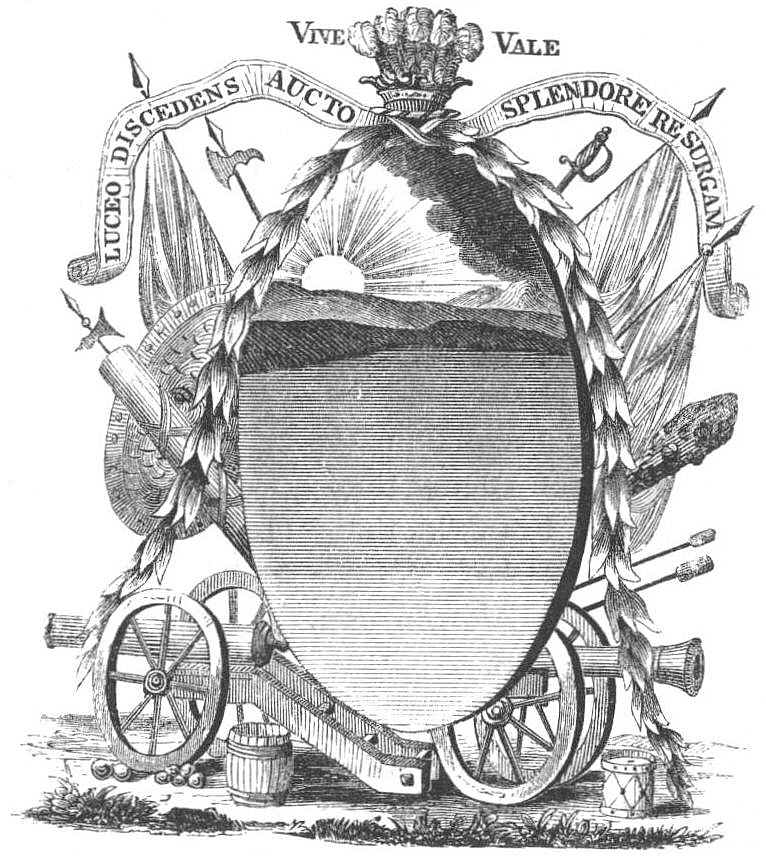
Mischianza ticket designed by Captain John André

The site was Walnut Grove, the mansion of Joseph Wharton. The crowd of over 400 guests included Admiral of the Fleet Richard Lord Howe, the general's brother; General Henry Clinton, commandant at New York and Howe's replacement; Peggy Shippen, future wife of Benedict Arnold; Peggy Chew, daughter of Benjamin Chew; Rebecca Franks, daughter of loyalist David Franks; Lord Cathcart; Banastre Tarleton; and Wilhelm von Knyphausen, a General of the Hessians, a mercenary unit of the German Military.

André, who was "social director" to the army in winter, was known as a poet, actor, etc. He was also well known as a competent violinist. As stage director, he painted background scenes for plays staged by British troops.

== Bibliography ==
- Ellet, E. F. (Elizabeth Fries) (1849). Women of the American Revolution. New York, Baker & Scribner.
- Stern, Mark Abbott (2010). David Franks : colonial merchant. Pennsylvania State University Press. ISBN 978-0-271-03669-4.
