= David Franks (loyalist) =

- Born: September 23, 1720; New York City, United States
- Died: October 1794 (aged 74); Isleworth, England
- Occupation: Merchant
- Known for: Loyalist
- Parent(s): Jacob Franks; Abigail Levy Franks

David Franks (September 23, 1720 – October 1794) was a loyalist in the war of the American Revolution.

== Life ==
David Franks was born in New York City, 23 September 1720, the youngest son of Jacob Franks (1687–1769) and Abigail Levy Franks, of a large and prominent Jewish family from England. As a young man, he moved to Philadelphia, where he became a successful merchant, engaging in land speculation, shipping, and fur trading in partnership with Nathan Levy under the firm name of Levy & Franks. This was the first Jewish business-house in Philadelphia.

Franks was a member of the Congregation Mikveh Israel and was elected a member of the provincial assembly in 1748. He and his wife Margaret Evans (1720–1780) of one of Philadelphia's Christian families were socially prominent in the city.

During the French and Indian War, he was engaged by the government to supply the army with provisions. In 1755, upon the defeat of General Braddock, he helped to raise a fund of £5,000 for the further defense of the colony. In the 1760s, He signed the Non-Importation Resolution of 1765, but eventually his loyalist tendencies won over. During the revolution, he was the king's agent for Pennsylvania. Perceived as a threat to the security of the United States, he was jailed briefly in 1778 by order of Congress, and then imprisoned again in 1780.

Franks participated in the importation and sale of African slaves.

From 1771 to 1781, he owned and occupied Woodford, a mansion in Germantown, now a National Historic Landmark, to which he added a second story and a rear two-story addition. After living in England for a time, Franks returned to Philadelphia in 1783, where he worked as a merchant.

== Death ==
By various accounts, Franks died in the Yellow Fever Epidemic of 1793 in Philadelphia, where he was buried in Christ Church Burial Ground. Others claim he returned again to England and died at Isleworth in October 1794.

== Family ==
Franks's wife died on September 20, 1780, and is interred at Christ Church Burial Ground.

His nephew, Col. David Salisbury Franks, a revolutionary who served as aide to Benedict Arnold, came under further suspicion because of his relationship with his loyalist uncle.

In 1768, his eldest daughter Abigail married Andrew Hamilton (1745–1813), elder brother of William Hamilton, well-known proprietor of "The Woodlands." His youngest daughter, Rebecca, became the wife of then British colonel (later General) Henry Johnson, and was one of the prominent young Philadelphians who attended the Mischianza Ball.
