= Philadelphia Contributionship =

- U.S. National Register of Historic Places
- U.S. National Historic Landmark
- Pennsylvania state historical marker
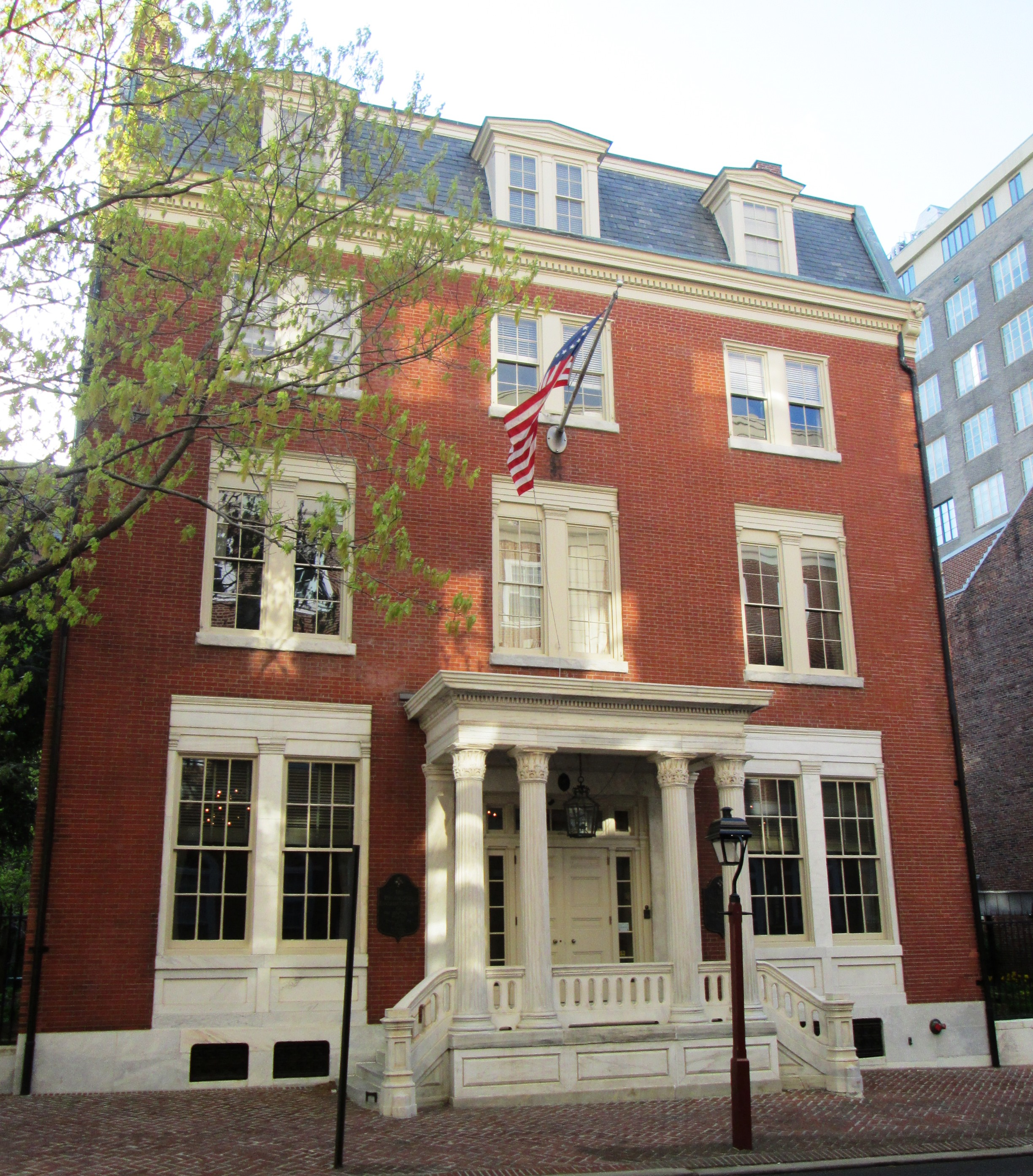
- The Philadelphia Contributionship in 2013

- Location within Philadelphia Location within Pennsylvania Location within the United States
- Location: 212 S. 4th Street; Philadelphia, Pennsylvania, U.S.
- Coordinates: 39°56′49″N 75°08′54″W
- Built: 1835-36
- Architect: Thomas U. Walter; Collins and Autenreith
- Architectural style: Greek Revival
- NRHP reference No.: 71000732

Significant dates
- Added to NRHP: May 27, 1971
- Designated NHL: December 22, 1977
- Designated PHMC: December 17, 1954

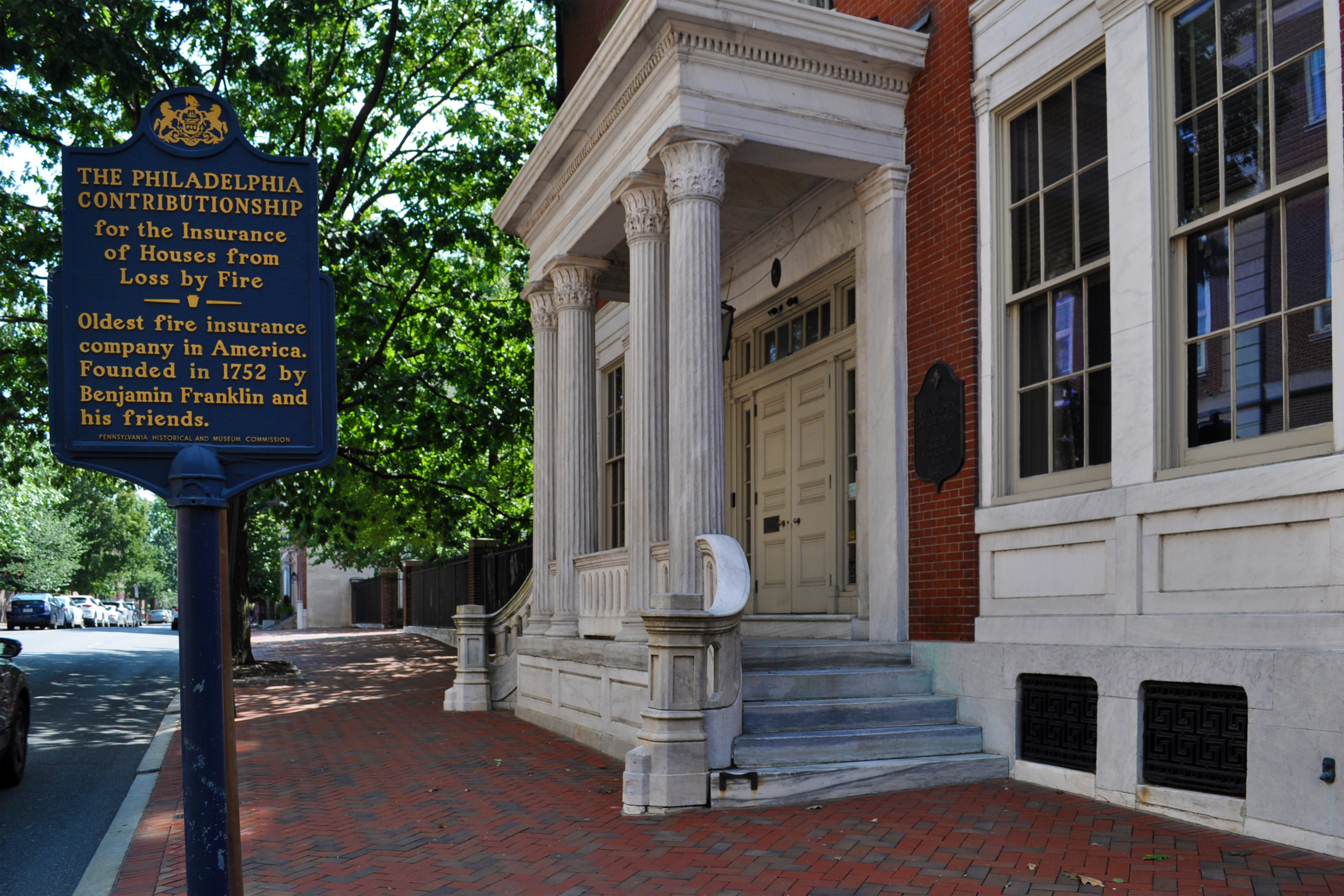
Philadelphia Contributionship Historical Marker at 212 S 4th St. in Philadelphia

The Philadelphia Contributionship for the Insurance of Houses from Loss by Fire is the oldest property insurance company in the United States. It was organized by Benjamin Franklin in 1752 and incorporated in 1768.

The Contributionship's building, at 212 S. 4th Street between Walnut and Locust Streets in the Society Hill neighborhood of Philadelphia, was built in 1835-36 and was designed by Thomas U. Walter in the Greek Revival style, with Corinthian columns. The portico was replaced in 1866 by Collins and Autenreith, who also expanded the living quarters on the top two floors by adding a mansard roof. A marble cornice between the third and fourth floors was also added. The building was listed on the National Register of Historic Places in 1971 and was designated a National Historic Landmark in 1977.

== History ==
=== 18th century ===
The Philadelphia Contributionship (TPC) was founded in 1752, largely through the efforts of Benjamin Franklin. It was structured as a mutual insurance organization, providing fire insurance to a limited area in and around Philadelphia. It introduced several key principles that underpin modern insurance techniques, including inspecting properties to be insured and setting rates based on a risk assessment. Buildings not constructed to specified standards were rejected for coverage, and rates could be raised for unsafe living practices, such as storing combustible materials in wooden buildings. The company was also the first to establish a financial reserve to pay claims.

Franklin's newspaper, The Pennsylvania Gazette, first began to advertise the April 13, 1752 organizational meeting in its issue of February 18, with a notice that "All persons inclined to subscribe to the articles of insurance of houses from fire, in or near this city, are desired to appear at the Court-house, where attendance will be given, to take in their subscriptions, every seventh day of the week, in the afternoon, until the 13th of April next, being the day appointed by the said articles for electing twelve directors and a treasurer."

The company directors first met in taverns and other public meeting spaces, with larger organizational meetings at the courthouse. Its directors finally purchased land for a permanent headquarters in 1835. The company placed its "four hands" fire insurance mark on buildings it insured.

As part of its effort to encourage minimization of risks in its insureds, in 1781 the Contributionship required its customers to cut down trees growing in front of their houses, which could impede fire-fighting activities and catch fire themselves. This proved an unpopular policy, particularly as it went against William Penn's "Green Country Town" idea for Philadelphia. In response, a rival insurance company was formed. The Mutual Assurance Company for Insuring Houses from Loss by Fire allowed its customers to keep trees in their yards, and it became known as "The Green Tree" company. Its fire insurance mark featured a green tree.

=== Present-day ===
The Philadelphia Contributionship is still up and running today, offering Homeowners Condo & Renters, Landlord Property, and Umbrella Liability Insurance Policies among other unique coverages. The network of agents has since expanded to serve in Pennsylvania, New Jersey, Delaware, Maryland, and Virginia.

TPC staffs over 120 employees and has been named a Top Workplace in Philadelphia by The Philadelphia Inquirer for five years.

== Early directors ==
Notable early directors of the company included:
Name	Occupation
William Coleman	judge
Benjamin Franklin	printer
Samuel Rhoads	architect / master carpenter
Philip Syng	silversmith

== See also ==
- History of insurance
- History of cooperatives in the United States
- List of National Historic Landmarks in Philadelphia
- National Register of Historic Places listings in Center City, Philadelphia
