= Woodford (mansion) =

Historic house in Pennsylvania, United States

- U.S. National Register of Historic Places
- U.S. National Historic Landmark
- U.S. Historic district – Contributing property
- Philadelphia Register of Historic Places
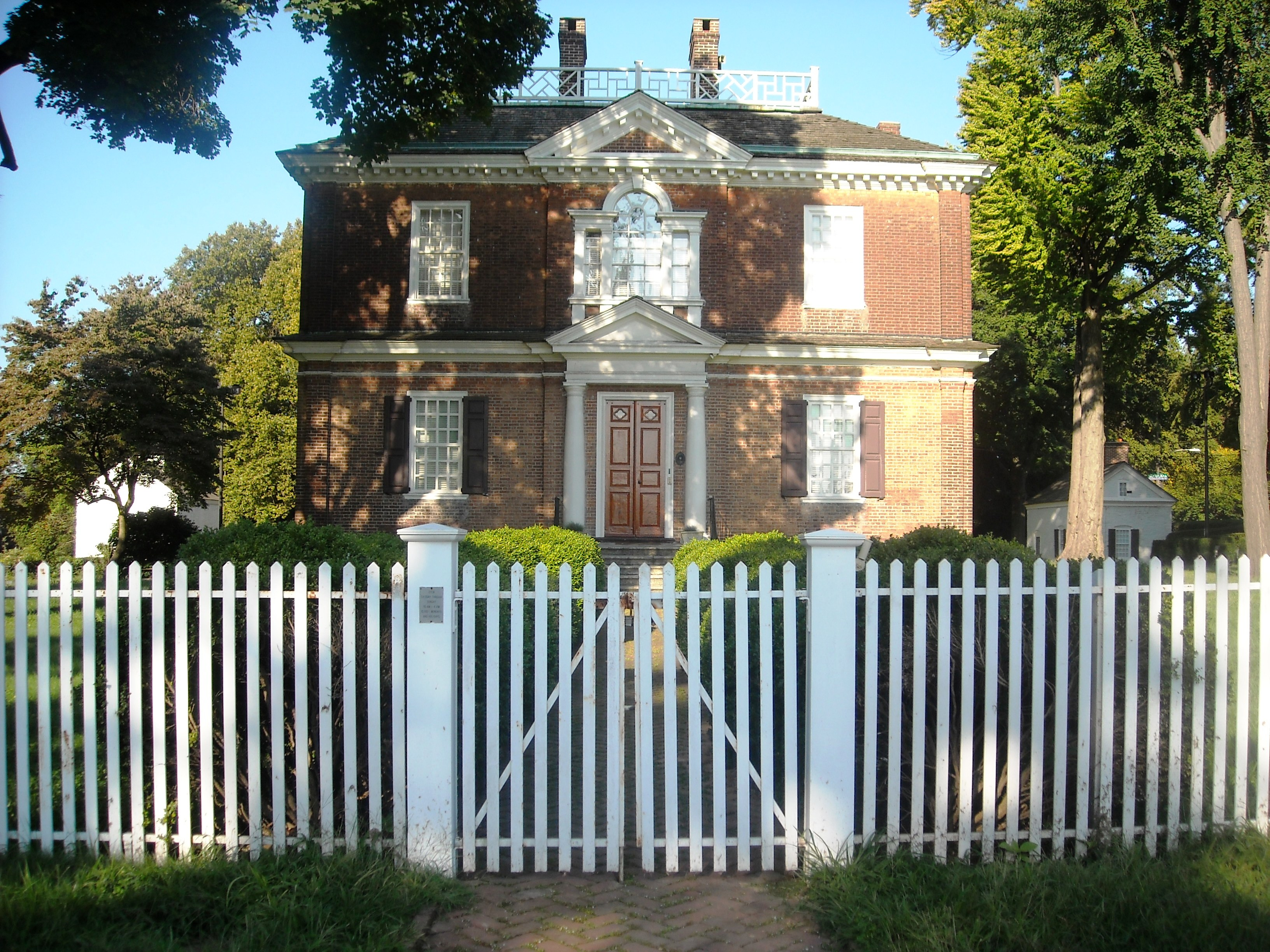

- Location within Philadelphia Location within Pennsylvania Location within the United States
- Location: Ford Road & Greenland Drive; East Fairmount Park; Philadelphia, Pennsylvania, United States
- Coordinates: 39°59′35″N 75°11′16″W
- Area: Less than 1-acre (4,000 m^{2})
- Built: c. 1756
- Architectural style: Georgian
- Part of: Fairmount Park Historic District (ID72001151)
- NRHP reference No.: 67000021

Significant dates
- Added to NRHP: December 24, 1967
- Designated NHL: December 24, 1967
- Designated CP: February 7, 1972

Woodford is a historic mansion at Ford Road and Greenland Drive in Fairmount Park, Philadelphia, Pennsylvania. Built c. 1756, it is the first of Philadelphia's great colonial Georgian mansion houses to be built, and exemplifies the opulence of such houses. A National Historic Landmark, it now a historic house museum open to the public.

== History ==
Woodford is the first of the great, opulent, late-Georgian mansions to be erected in the Philadelphia area. Woodford was built on 12 acres (49,000 m^{2}) of land as a 1½-story summer residence by William Coleman, a wealthy merchant and justice of the Pennsylvania Supreme Court.

Upon Coleman's death in 1769, the house was sold to Alexander Barclay, a Quaker who served as His Majesty's Customs Comptroller for the port of Philadelphia.

Upon Barclay's death in 1771, the house was bought by his brother-in-law, David Franks, who in 1772 added a second story and a kitchen wing, enlarging the house to almost its present size.

In 1778, Franks, a staunch loyalist, was arrested and ordered to leave. He took his family to New York City, and transferred the property to Thomas Paschall in settlement of a debt. Paschall is believed never to have lived at the house, but rented it out. He sold it to Isaac Wharton in 1793.

In 1869, the city bought Woodford from Wharton's heirs to add to Fairmount Park. The house served as the home of the Park's Chief Engineer and Supervisor, and later, in 1912, as the Park Guard headquarters and traffic court.

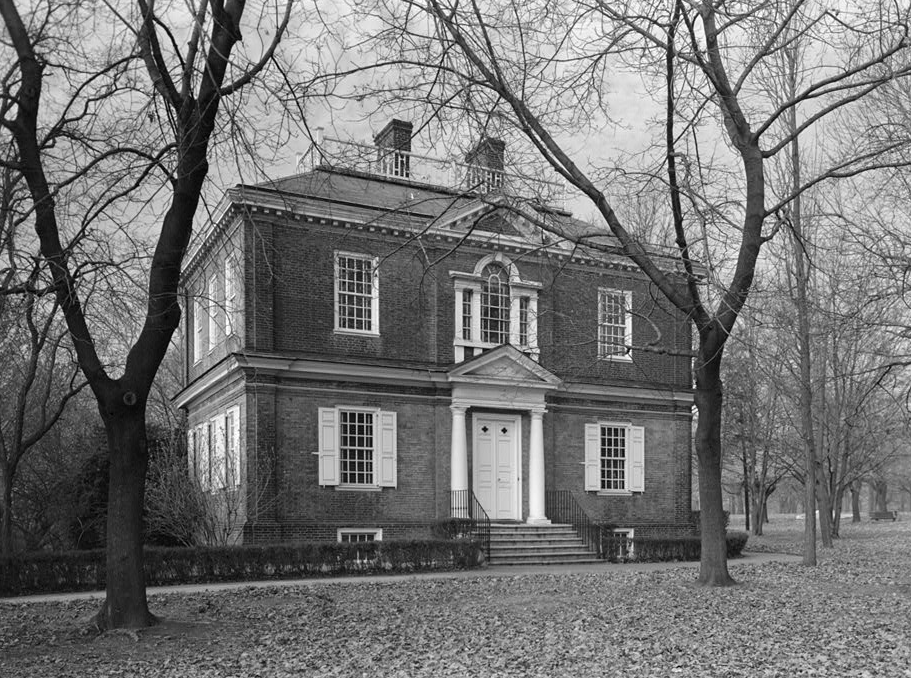
Woodford, after 1933, Historic American Buildings Survey

The building was restored, commencing in 1927, and in 1930, it was opened to the public as a house museum, which it remains today. It houses, under the direction of the Naomi Wood Trust, the Naomi Wood collection of antique household goods, including Colonial furniture, unusual clocks, and English delftware.

Woodford was designated a National Historic Landmark in 1967. It is a contributing property of the Fairmount Park Historic District.

== See also ==
- List of houses in Fairmount Park
- List of National Historic Landmarks in Philadelphia
- National Register of Historic Places listings in North Philadelphia
