= Abigail Franks =

English-American Ashkenazi Jewish woman (c. 1696 – 1756)

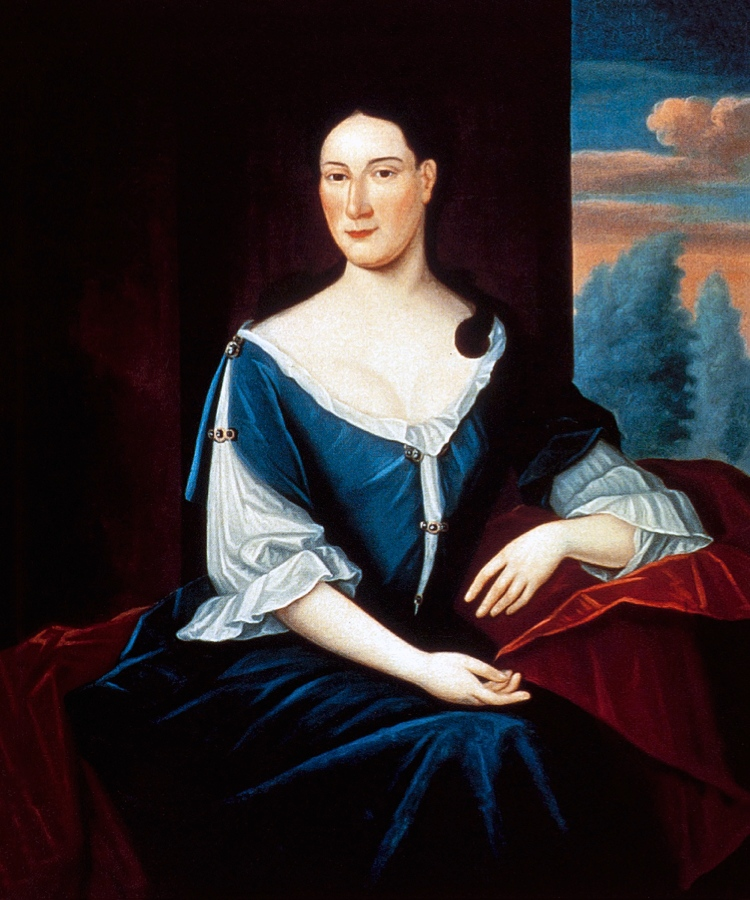
- Portrait of Abigail Franks, c. 1735
- Born: Bilhah Abigail Levy c. 1696; London, England
- Died: 1756 (aged 59–60); New York City, Province of New York, British America
- Burial place: First Cemetery of Congregation Shearith Israel, New York
- Known for: Letters describing political, social, and religious life in colonial New York
- Spouse: Jacob Franks
- Children: 9
- Parents: Moses Levy (father); Richea Asher (mother)

Bilhah Abigail Levy Franks (c. 1696 – 1756) was an English–born Ashkenazi Jewish woman who lived most of her life in the Province of New York, British America. Born in London and raised in New York City, she married a London-born merchant and reared a family of nine children. While committed to Jewish observance, she and her family also socialized freely in the wider Christian society. Theirs was considered one of the prominent families of colonial New York.

She is known for the letters she wrote to her eldest son, Naphtali, after he moved to England. Spanning the years 1733 to 1748, these letters describe the political and social milieu of 18th-century New York, together with the assimilation and interfaith marriage that affected Jewish families. Two of Abigail's children married outside of the religion and all of her grandchildren assimilated.

== Early life ==
Bilhah Abigail Levy was born in London to Moses (Raphael) Levy, a German–Jewish merchant, and his wife Richea (Rycha) Asher. She had four brothers. Her father relocated the family to New York City in the early 1700s and became a wealthy, respected merchant in the trans-Atlantic slave trade. Abigail received a "formal, classical education". Her mother died when she was 11 and her father remarried to Grace Mears, with whom he had eight more children.

== Marriage and family ==
In 1712 at the age of 16, Abigail married Jacob Franks (1688–1769), a London-born businessman. The couple had nine children between the years 1715 and 1742; two died in childhood. They were married for 44 years until Abigail's death.

The Jewish population of Colonial New York at that time was minuscule, comprising only about 50 families. Nevertheless, Abigail ran a traditional Jewish home, including strict Sabbath observance, Jewish holiday observance, and a kosher kitchen. All her children received "Hebrew instruction" and were familiar with the prayers. The family were members of Congregation Shearith Israel; Jacob served as president of the synagogue in 1730.

At the same time, the Franks were active members of the wider Christian society. Jacob established himself in a variety of trades, including "the slave trade, privateering, general commerce, and shipping", and became quite wealthy. The Franks were considered one of the leading families of New York in the Colonial era. Residing on the East River, they lived in proximity to Adolphus Philipse, Frederick and Jacobus Van Cortlandt, Robert Livingston, Abraham de Peyster, and Stephen Bayard, all prominent Protestants and civic leaders. Jacob and his father-in-law, Moses Levy, were among the 11 Jews who helped pay for a steeple for the First Trinity Church in Manhattan, which served as a beacon for incoming ships. Abigail had many close friends who were Christian and spent summer holidays with them.

Beginning around 1732, Abigail and Jacob began sending their children to England to learn the family business. Sons Naphtali and Moses both established themselves in England and helped develop their father's business interests; David did the same after moving to Philadelphia.

With the limited number of Jewish marriage prospects in colonial America, the Franks family's comfort level with Christian society, and the willingness of Protestant families to wed their children to their Jewish neighbors, two of Abigail's children intermarried. Abigail broke off all contact with her eldest daughter, Phila, after the latter secretly married Oliver De Lancey, the scion of a Christian Huguenot merchant family in New York; Phila later converted to Christianity. (Jacob, however, accepted the marriage, as it "allied the Franks clan with the well-connected DeLanceys".) David married the daughter of one of Abigail's Christian friends. Naphtali and Moses both married Jewish first-cousins in England, but all of their offspring assimilated. It is unknown if any of Abigail's other children married. By the end of the 18th century, she had no Jewish descendants.

== Letters ==
Abigail kept up a lively correspondence with her eldest son, Naphtali, in England. Thirty-four of her letters survive, as well as one letter from Jacob and two letters from David. The collection of letters dates from 7 May 1733 to 30 October 1748.

The letters cover a range of topics, including family and community gossip, local politics, and Abigail's observations on the current state and future of Judaism in colonial New York. While Abigail embraced Jewish observance and thought it important that her children marry within the fold, she was critical of contemporary Jewish practice. In her letters she expressed a desire to inject more modernity into the religion to counter its "Many Supersti[ti]ons", and denigrated the Jewish women of New York as "a Stupid Set of people". She describes the lives of other Jewish American women of the era, including her stepmother, Grace Mears Levy, and Grace's eldest daughter, Rachel Levy, who married Isaac Mendes Seixas, a Sephardi Jew. Abigail, of Ashkenazi Jewish descent, did not socialize with Sephardi Jews, although some were members of her synagogue. She wrote to her son about Rachel's marriage proposal: "The Portugeuze here are in a great ferment abouth it. And think Very Ill of him."

Like her contemporaries, Abigail's spelling skills were wanting, but she enjoyed reading classical literature and contemporary magazines. She often quoted lines from the English poets John Dryden, Alexander Pope, and Joseph Addison, as well as contemporary writers, in her correspondence.

== Franks-Levy portraits ==
Abigail mentions several portrait commissions in her letters to Naphtali, and the Franks and Levy families are known to have commissioned portraits of themselves and engaged in exchanges of portraits with family members in London. A series of seven portraits is traditionally held to depict three generations of family members, although some scholars have questioned the sitters' identities. Donated to the American Jewish Historical Society in 1951 and currently housed at the Crystal Bridges Museum of American Art in Bentonville, Arkansas, these portraits are contained in original frames and touted as "the oldest surviving portraits of colonial American Jews, and the oldest family-series portraits to survive in all of American painting". The portraits – held to represent Moses Levy, Grace Mears Levy, Jacob Franks, Abigail Franks, Naphtali Franks, and two other children of Abigail and Jacob – are believed to have been painted in the 1720s and 1730s by Gerardus Duyckinck. They reflect the "costume, background, and pose" of English aristocrats and give no outward indication that the subjects are Jewish.

== Sources ==
- American Jewish Historical Society (1998). American Jewish History: The Colonial and Early National Periods, 1654–1840. Vol. I. Taylor & Francis. ISBN 0415919207.
- Faber, Eli (1995). A Time for Planting: The First Migration, 1654–1820. JHU Press. ISBN 0801851203.
- Marcus, Jacob Rader (1981). The American Jewish Woman: A Documentary History. KTAV Publishing House, Inc. ISBN 0870687522.
- Smith, Ellen (2003), "Portraits of a Community", in Nadell, Pamela S. (ed.), American Jewish Women's History: A Reader, NYC Press, ISBN 0814758088
- Taitz, Emily; Henry, Sondra; Tallan, Cheryl (2003). The JPS Guide to Jewish Women: 600 B.C.E.to 1900 C.E. Jewish Publication Society. ISBN 0827607520.
