= Co-op Kobe =

Japanese consumers' cooperative

Co-op Kobe (Japanese: コープこうべ), officially known as Consumer Co-operative Kobe, is a consumers' cooperative based in Kobe, Japan. It was founded in 1921 by Toyohiko Kagawa, and was later merged with Nada Consumer Co-operative. Now, with over 1.2 million members, it is the largest consumers' cooperative in the world.
