= Toyohiko Kagawa =

Japanese Christian social reformer

- 賀川 豊彦
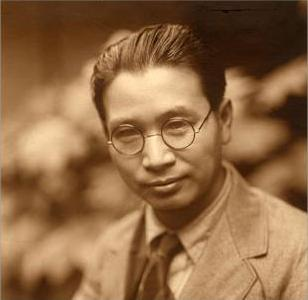
- c. 1920

Member of the House of Peers
- In office March 1946 – May 1947 Nominated by the Emperor

Personal details
- Born: 10 July 1888 Kobe, Hyōgo, Japan
- Died: 23 April 1960 (aged 71) Tokyo, Japan
- Spouse: Haru Shiba (m. 1913)
- Occupation: Social reformer, peace activist, labor activist, evangelist, author

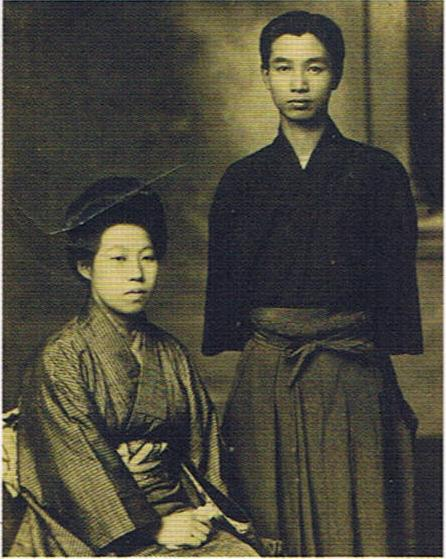
Kagawa and Haru

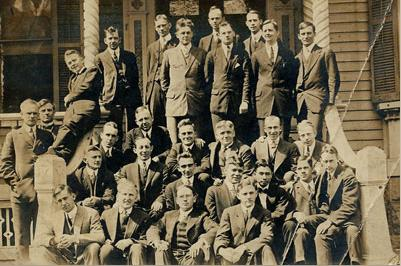
Kagawa at Princeton Theological Seminary

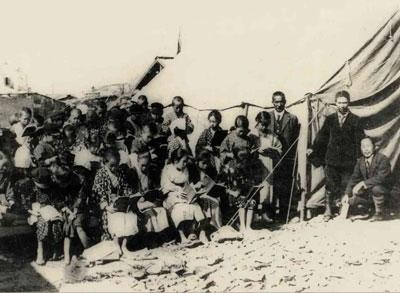
Great Kantō earthquake, 1923

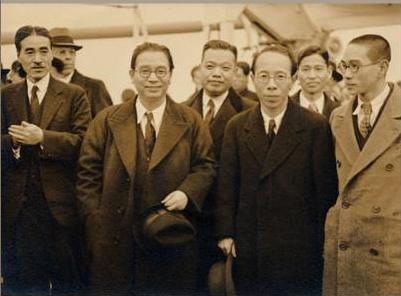
Kagawa in 1935

Toyohiko Kagawa (賀川 豊彦, Kagawa Toyohiko; 10 July 1888 – 23 April 1960) was a Japanese Evangelical Christian pacifist, Christian reformer, and labour activist. Kagawa wrote, spoke, and worked at length on ways to employ Christian principles in the ordering of society and in cooperatives. His vocation to help the poor led him to live among them. He advocated for women's suffrage and promoted a peaceful foreign policy.

== Early life ==
Kagawa was born in Kobe, Japan to a philandering businessman and a concubine. Both parents died while he was young. He was sent away to school, where he learned from two American missionary teachers, Drs. Harry W. Myers and Charles A. Logan, who took him into their homes.

Kagawa learned English from these missionaries and converted to evangelical Protestant Christianity after taking a Bible class in his youth, which led to his being disowned by his remaining extended family. Kagawa studied at Tokyo Presbyterian College, and later enrolled in Kobe Theological Seminary. While studying there, Kagawa was troubled by the seminarians' concern for technicalities of doctrine. He believed that Christianity in action was the truth behind Christian doctrines. Impatiently, he would point to the parable of the Good Samaritan. From 1914 to 1916 he studied at Princeton Theological Seminary. In addition to theology, through the university's curricular exchange program he also studied embryology, genetics, comparative anatomy, and paleontology while at Princeton.

== Activism ==
In 1909 Kagawa moved into a Kobe slum with the intention of acting as a missionary, social worker, and sociologist. In 1914 he went to the United States to study ways of combating the sources of poverty. In 1916 he published Researches in the Psychology of the Poor based on this experience in which he recorded many aspects of slum society that were previously unknown to middle-class Japanese. Among these were the practices of illicit prostitution (i.e., outside of Japan's legal prostitution regime), informal marriages (which often overlapped with the previous category), and the practice of accepting money to care for children and then killing them.

Kagawa was arrested in Japan in 1921 and again in 1922 for his part in labour activism during strikes. While in prison he wrote the novels Crossing the Deathline and Shooting at the Sun. The former was a semi-autobiographical depiction of his time among Kobe's destitute. After his release, Kagawa helped organize relief work in Tokyo following the 1923 Great Kantō earthquake and assisted in bringing about universal adult male suffrage in 1925.

He organized the Japanese Federation of Labour as well as the National Anti-War League in 1928. Throughout this period, he continued to evangelize to Japan's poor, advocate women's suffrage and call for a peaceful foreign policy. Between 1926 and 1934 he focused his evangelical work through the Kingdom of God Movement.

Arthur Miller writes about hearing Kagawa give an evangelical lecture in Hill Auditorium at the University of Michigan in Ann Arbor, in 1935, and describes him as "a merchant of the sublime."

Like most Japanese at the time, Kagawa fervently opposed the Italian invasion of Ethiopia. In May 1936, during a visit to the United States, Kagawa participated in an assembly held in St. Louis where he addressed 100,000 people, mostly black, with a speech against Italian imperialism.

In 1940, Kagawa made an apology to the Republic of China for Japan's occupation of China, and was arrested again for this act. After his release, he went back to the United States in a futile attempt to prevent war between that nation and Japan. He then returned to Japan to continue his attempts to win women's suffrage. After Japan's surrender, Kagawa was an adviser to the transitional Japanese government.

Kagawa supported retaining the Japanese imperial institution and advocated a form of democracy under a constitutional monarchy. In his 1946 publication The Emperor System and Democracy (天皇制と民主主義), he argued that a monarchical form of democracy was appropriate for Japan and regarded the Emperor as a figure of national unity who transcended political divisions. He also described the imperial household as a moral institution. At the founding convention of the Japan Socialist Party on 2 November 1945, he joined Inejirō Asanuma and others in leading three cheers of "Tennō Heika Banzai!" (Long live the Emperor!).

Along with Albert Einstein, Kagawa was one of the sponsors of the Peoples' World Convention (PWC), also known as Peoples' World Constituent Assembly (PWCA), which took place in 1950-51 at Palais Electoral, Geneva, Switzerland. He was also one of the signatories of the agreement to convene a convention for drafting a world constitution. As a result, for the first time in human history, a World Constituent Assembly convened to draft and adopt the Constitution for the Federation of Earth.

During his life, Kagawa wrote over 150 books. He was nominated for the Nobel Prize in Literature in 1947 and 1948, and for the Nobel Peace Prize in 1954 and 1955.

== Health and death ==
In Osaka, March 1955, Kagawa suffered collapse from his deteriorating heart, and remained bedridden for two weeks. He continued writing, preaching, overseeing projects, and hosting guests, despite concerns from his family and associates. Kagawa's condition worsened throughout the years, and he was hospitalized again, for three months in 1959, at Saint Luke's Hospital in Takamatsu.

Kagawa remained bedridden at home for most of his time in Matsuzawa. His health gradually improved in mid-April, then worsened again. On 23 April, Kagawa was unconscious for three hours, then woke and smiled to his wife and others around him, his last words being "Please do your best for world peace and the church in Japan."

== Brotherhood economics ==
Kagawa's economic theory, as expressed in the book Brotherhood Economics, advocated that the Christian Church, the cooperative movement, and the peace movement unite in a 'powerful working synthesis' to provide a workable alternative to capitalism, state socialism, and fascism.

Kagawa's work in the co-operative movement consisted of founding several consumer co-operatives in 1921, including the Co-op Kobe, Nada Consumer Co-operative (later merged with Co-op Kobe), the Kyoto Consumer Co-operative, Tokyo Student's Consumer Co-operative and Tokyo Iryou (Medical) Consumer Co-operative.

== Three-dimensional forestry ==
While studying at Princeton University, Kagawa read Tree Crops: A Permanent Agriculture by Joseph Russell Smith. Inspired by this book, he managed to persuade many of Japan's upland farmers during the 1930s that the solution to their soil erosion problem lay in widespread tree-planting. Kagawa also advised that they could receive further benefit if they planted crop trees, such as quick-maturing walnuts, to provide feed for their pigs.

The planting of fruit and nut trees on farmland aims to conserve the soil, supply food for humans and provide fodder for animals, the three "dimensions" of his system. Kagawa was a forerunner of modern forest farming and an inspiration to Robert Hart who pioneered forest gardening in temperate climates.

== Legacy ==
After his death, Kagawa was awarded the second-highest honor of Japan, induction in the Order of the Sacred Treasure. The Evangelical Lutheran Church in America commemorates him as a renewer of society on 23 April; Kagawa is also honored with a feast day on the liturgical calendar of the Episcopal Church (USA) and on the Calendar of the Presbyterian Church (USA) on that day. The Washington National Cathedral erected a statue in his honor in the early 1970s, in the same aisle that features a statue of Martin Luther King Jr. and other notable figures.

== Famous quotes ==
- On the morning of 1946, at the Imperial Palace in Tokyo, before emperor Hirohito, "Whosoever will be great among you... shall be the servant of all. A ruler's sovereignty, Your Majesty, is in the hearts of the people. Only by service to others can a man, or nation, be godlike."
- "Communism's only power is to diagnose some of the ills of disordered society. It has no cure. It creates only an infantile paralysis of the social order."
- "I read in a book that a man called Christ went about doing good. It is very disconcerting to me that I am so easily satisfied with just going about."
- "It seemed that everyone was attacking me – the Soviet Communists, the anarchists, the capitalists, the foul-mouthed literary critics, the sensationalist newspaper men, the Buddhist who could not compete with Christ, and those many Christians who profess Christ but believe in a Christianity which is sterile."

== Works ==
- Kagawa Toyohiko (1930). Love - The Law of Life. London: Student Christian Movement Press.
- ——— (1931). The Religion of Jesus. Translated by Speer, Robert E. The John C. Winston Company.
- ——— (1935). Meditations on the Cross. Translated by Topping, Helen; Draper, Marion. Chicago, New York: Willet, Clark & Company.
- ——— (1935). Songs from the Slums. Translated by Erickson, Lois J. Nashville, TN: Cokesbury Press.
- ——— (1936). Brotherhood Economics. New York, NY: Harper & Brothers.
- ——— (2014). Cosmic Purpose. Veritas. Translated by Hastings, Thomas John. Cascade. ISBN 978-1-62564-509-8.

== See also ==
- List of civil rights leaders
- Japanese dissidence during the Shōwa period
