= Johnson baronets =

Four baronetcies have been created for persons with the surname Johnson. As of 2024, two are extinct.

- Johnson baronets of New York (1755)
- Johnson baronetcy of Ballikicavan (1775): see Johnson-Walsh baronets
- Johnson baronets of Bath (1818)
- Johnson baronets of Dublin (1909): see Sir William Moore Johnson, 1st Baronet

== See also ==
- Johnson-Ferguson baronets
