= Outline of the American Revolutionary War =

The following outline is provided as an overview of and topical guide to the American Revolutionary War.

American Revolutionary War – war of independence between the Kingdom of Great Britain and the United States that was fought from April 19, 1775 to September 3, 1783. The war was fought as part of the broader American Revolution, in which the Thirteen Colonies made a declaration of independence in response to disputes regarding political representation. The conflict took place in the present-day Eastern United States, which the Thirteen Colonies successfully defended with the assistance of French, Dutch, and Spanish support. American victory led to the creation of the United States.

== Background ==
- Colonial history of the United States
- French and Indian War
- American Enlightenment
- American Revolution
- No taxation without representation
- Boston Tea Party

=== Acts of Great Britain ===
- Royal Proclamation of 1763
- Sugar Act 1764
- Currency Act
- Quartering Acts
  - Quartering Act 1765
  - Quartering Act 1774
- Stamp Act 1765
- Declaratory Act
- Revenue Act of 1766
- Townshend Acts
  - New York Restraining Act 1767
  - Revenue Act 1767
  - Indemnity Act 1767
  - Commissioners of Customs Act 1767
  - Vice Admiralty Court Act 1768
- Tea Act 1773
- Intolerable Acts
  - Boston Port Act
  - Massachusetts Government Act
  - Administration of Justice Act 1774
  - Quartering Act 1774
  - Quebec Act
- Conciliatory Resolution
- Restraining Acts 1775
  - New England Trade and Fisheries Act
  - Trade Act 1775
- Proclamation of Rebellion
- Prohibitory Act

== Participants ==
=== Great Britain ===
- Kingdom of Great Britain
- Cherokee
- Hessians
- Iroquois Confederacy
  - Cayuga
  - Mohawk
  - Onondaga
  - Seneca
- Mi'kmaq
- Muscogee
- Odawa
- Shawnee
- Susquehannock
- Loyalists fighting in the American Revolution

=== United States ===
- United States of America
  - Connecticut
  - Delaware
  - Georgia
  - Maryland
  - Massachusetts
  - New Hampshire
  - New Jersey
  - New York
  - North Carolina
  - Pennsylvania
  - Rhode Island
  - South Carolina
  - Virginia
- Abenaki
- Catawba
- Chickasaw
- Choctaw
- Kingdom of France
- Lenape
- Mi'kmaq
- Mohicans
- Oneida
- Pedee
- Seminole
- Tuscarora
- Vermont Republic

==== Support from ====
- Dutch Republic
- Kingdom of Spain

=== Neutral parties ===
- Nantucket during the American Revolutionary War era
- Russia and the American Revolution

== Campaigns and theaters ==
Conflicts between forces of at least 1,000 soldiers are denoted in bold.

=== Northern theater ===
==== Boston campaign ====
- Powder Alarm (September 1, 1774)
- **Battles of Lexington and Concord** (April 19, 1775)
- Battle of Menotomy (April 19, 1775)
- **Siege of Boston** (April 19, 1775 – March 17, 1776)
  - Battle of Chelsea Creek (May 27, 1775 – May 28, 1775)
  - **Battle of Bunker Hill** (June 17, 1775)
  - Battle of Machias (June 11, 1775 – June 12, 1775)
  - **Fortification of Dorchester Heights** (March 4, 1776 – March 5, 1776)
- Battle off Fairhaven (May 14, 1775)
- Battle of Gloucester (August 8, 1775)
- Burning of Falmouth (October 18, 1775)
- Knox Expedition (November 17, 1775 – January 25, 1776)

==== Invasion of Quebec ====
- Capture of Fort Ticonderoga (May 10, 1775)
- Siege of Fort St. Jean (September 17, 1775 – November 3, 1775)
- Battle of Longue-Pointe (September 25, 1775)
- Benedict Arnold's expedition to Quebec (September 11, 1775 – November 9, 1775)
- **Battle of Quebec (1775)** (December 31, 1775)
- Battle of Saint-Pierre (March 25, 1776)
- Battle of the Cedars (May 18, 1776 – May 27, 1776)
- **Battle of Trois-Rivières** (June 8, 1776)
- Battle of Valcour Island (October 11, 1776)

==== Nova Scotia campaign ====
- Raid on St. John (August 27, 1775)
- Raid on Charlottetown (November 17, 1775 – November 18, 1775)
- Raid on Yarmouth (December 5, 1775)
- Raid on Canso (September 22, 1776 – November 22, 1776)
- Battle of Fort Cumberland (November 10, 1776 – November 29, 1776)
- Battle off Yarmouth (March 28, 1777)
- St. John River expedition (June 2, 1777 – June 30, 1777)
- Capture of USS Hancock (July 8, 1777 – July 9, 1777)
- Battle off Liverpool (April 24, 1778).
- Battle off Halifax (July 10, 1780)
- Battle of Blomindon (May 21, 1781)
- Action of 21 July 1781 (July 21, 1781)
- Raid on Annapolis Royal (August 29, 1781)
- Battle off Halifax (May 28, 1782 – May 29, 1782)
- Raid on Chester (June 30, 1782)
- Raid on Lunenburg (July 1, 1782)

==== New York and New Jersey campaign ====
- **Battle of Long Island** (August 26, 1776)
- Landing at Kip's Bay (September 15, 1776)
- **Battle of Harlem Heights** (September 16, 1776)
- Battle of Pell's Point (October 18, 1776)
- Battle of Mamaroneck (October 22, 1776)
- **Battle of White Plains** (October 28, 1776)
- **Battle of Fort Washington** (November 16, 1776)
- **Battle of Fort Lee** (November 20, 1776)
- Ambush of Geary (December 14, 1776)
- Battle of Iron Works Hill (December 22, 1776 – December 23, 1776)
- **Battle of Trenton** (December 26, 1776)
  - George Washington's crossing of the Delaware River (December 25, 1776)
- **Battle of the Assunpink Creek** (January 2, 1777)
- **Battle of Princeton** (January 3, 1777)
- Battle of Millstone (January 20, 1777)

==== Saratoga campaign ====
- **Siege of Fort Ticonderoga (1777)** (July 2, 1777 – July 6, 1777)
- **Battle of Hubbardton** (July 7, 1777)
- Battle of Fort Anne (July 8, 1777)
- **Siege of Fort Stanwix** (August 2, 1777 – August 22, 1777)
- Battle of Oriskany (August 6, 1777)
- Battle of Bennington (August 16, 1777)
- Battles of Saratoga
  - **Battle of Freeman's Farm** (September 19, 1777)
  - **Battle of Bemis Heights** (October 7, 1777)
- Battle of Forts Clinton and Montgomery (October 6, 1777)
- Burning of Kingston (October 16, 1777)

==== Philadelphia campaign ====
- Battle of Bound Brook (April 13, 1777)
- **Battle of Short Hills** (June 26, 1777)
- **Battle of Staten Island** (August 22, 1777)
- **Battle of Cooch's Bridge** (September 3, 1777)
- **Battle of Brandywine** (September 11, 1777)
- Battle of the Clouds (September 16, 1777)
- **Battle of Paoli** (September 20, 1777)
- Siege of Fort Mifflin (September 26, 1777 – November 16, 1777)
- **Battle of Germantown** (October 4, 1777)
- Battle of Red Bank (October 22, 1777)
- Battle of Gloucester (November 25, 1777)
- **Battle of White Marsh** (December 5, 1777 – December 8, 1777)
- Battle of Matson's Ford (December 11, 1777)
- Battle of Quinton's Bridge (March 18, 1778)
- Clow Rebellion (April 14, 1778 – April 17, 1778)
- Battle of Crooked Billet (May 1, 1778)
- **Battle of Barren Hill** (May 20, 1778)
- **Battle of Monmouth** (June 28, 1778)

==== Northern theater after Saratoga ====
- Battle of Cobleskill (May 30, 1778)
- Battle of Wyoming (July 3, 1778)
- Attack on German Flatts (September 17, 1778)
- Baylor massacre (September 27, 1778)
- Battle of Edgar's Lane (September 30, 1778)
- Raid on Unadilla and Onaquaga (October 2, 1778 – October 16, 1778)
- Carleton's Raid (October 24, 1778 – November 14, 1778)
- Cherry Valley massacre (November 11, 1778)
- Battle of Stony Point (July 16, 1779)
- Battle of Minisink (July 19, 1779 – July 22, 1779)
- Sullivan Expedition (June 18, 1779 – October 3, 1779)
  - **Battle of Newtown** (August 29, 1779)
  - Boyd and Parker ambush (September 13, 1779)
- Battle of Paulus Hook (August 19, 1779)
- Battle of Young's House (February 3, 1780)
- **Battle of Connecticut Farms** (June 7, 1780)
- **Battle of Springfield** (June 23, 1780)
- Battle of Bull's Ferry (July 20, 1780 – July 21, 1780)
- Royalton raid (October 16, 1780)
- **Battle of Klock's Field** (October 19, 1780)
- Battle of Pine's Bridge (May 14, 1781)
- Battle of Johnstown (October 25, 1781)

=== Western theater ===
- Siege of Fort Henry (September 1777)
- Siege of Boonesborough (September 7, 1778 – September 18, 1778)
- Siege of Fort Vincennes (February 23, 1779 – February 25, 1779)
- Siege of Fort Laurens (February 22, 1779 – March 20, 1779)
- Battle of Chillicothe (May 1779)
- Battle of St. Louis (May 25, 1780)
- Bird's invasion of Kentucky (May 25, 1780 – August 4, 1780)
- Battle of Piqua (August 8, 1780)
- La Balme's Defeat (November 5, 1780)
- Brodhead's Coshocton expedition (April 1781)
- Lochry's Defeat (August 24, 1781)
- Long Run massacre (September 13, 1781 – September 14, 1781)
- Gnadenhutten massacre (March 8, 1782)
- Battle of Little Mountain (March 22, 1782)
- Crawford expedition (May 25, 1782 – June 12, 1782)
- Siege of Bryan Station (August 15, 1782 – August 17, 1782)
- Battle of Blue Licks (August 19, 1782)
- Siege of Fort Henry (September 11, 1782 – September 13, 1782)
- Colbert raid (April 17, 1783)

==== Illinois campaign ====
- Clark's journey down the Ohio (May 12, 1778 – May 27, 1778)
- Occupation of the Illinois Country (June 1778)
- Hamilton retakes Vincennes (December 17, 1778)
- Clark's trek to Vincennes (February 1779)
- Siege of Fort Sackville (February 23, 1779 – February 25, 1779)

== People ==
=== Leaders ===
- Great Britain
  - Head of state: George III
  - Head of government:
    - Frederick North, Lord North
    - Charles Watson-Wentworth, 2nd Marquess of Rockingham
    - William Petty, 2nd Earl of Shelburne
  - Commander-in-Chief of the Forces:
    - Jeffery Amherst, 1st Baron Amherst
    - Henry Seymour Conway
- United States
  - Commander-in-chief: George Washington
- France
  - Absolute monarch: Louis XVI

=== Military forces ===
- Continental Army
- United States militia units
- Continental Navy
- British Army
- Royal Navy

=== Demographics ===
- African Americans in the Revolutionary War
  - Black Loyalist
  - Dunmore's Proclamation
  - Philipsburg Proclamation
- Jewish Americans in the Revolutionary War
- Native Americans in the Revolutionary War
- Women in the American Revolutionary War

== Practices ==
- Financial costs of the American Revolutionary War
- Intelligence in the American Revolutionary War
- Prisoners of war in the American Revolutionary War

=== Diplomacy ===
- Letters to the inhabitants of Canada
- Conciliatory Resolution
- Olive Branch Petition
- Treaty of Watertown
- Staten Island Peace Conference
- Franco-American alliance
  - Treaty of Alliance
- Carlisle Peace Commission
- Treaty of Fort Pitt
- First League of Armed Neutrality
- Treaty of Paris
