= Jacob Klock =

Jacob Klock may refer to:

- Jacob Klock (colonel) (1701–1798), military leader in the American Revolutionary War
- Jacob George Klock (1738–1814), judge and state senator for New York
