= Battle of Cobleskill =

American Revolutionary War raid

- Part of the American Revolutionary War
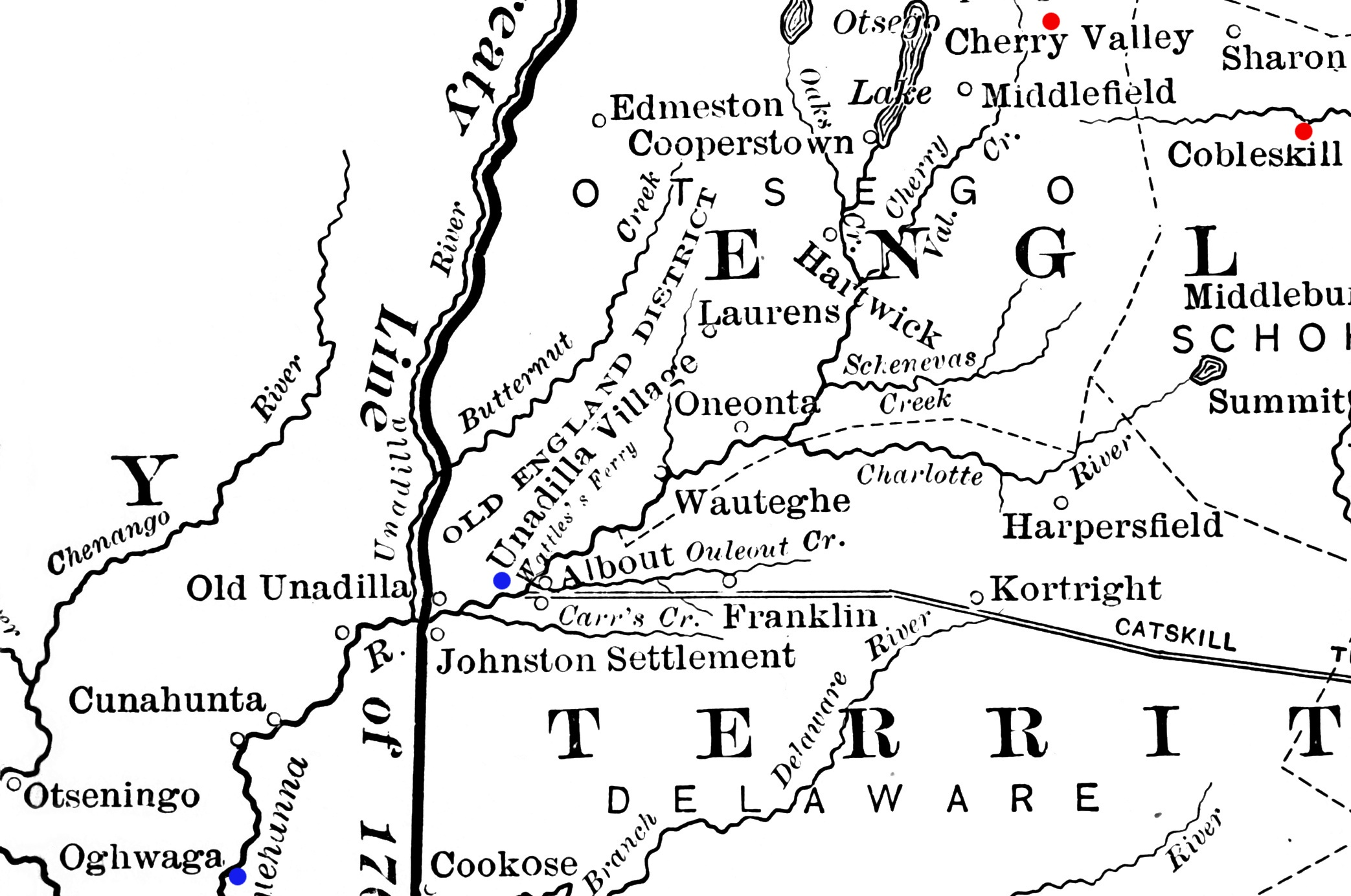
- Map detail showing the western frontier of New York. Cobleskill and Cherry Valley are marked in red, Unadilla and Onaquaga (spelled "Oghwaga" on the map) are marked in blue.
Date	May 30, 1778
Location	Cobleskill, New York 42°40′45″N 74°29′8″W
Result	British-Haudenosaunee victory

Belligerents
Great Britain; Haudenosaunee	United States

Commanders and leaders
Joseph Brant	William Patrick †; Christian Brown

Strength
200–300 Loyalists and Haudenosaunee	30–40 regulars 15–20 militia

Casualties and losses
Unknown	22 killed 8 wounded 5 captured

The Battle of Cobleskill was an American Revolutionary War raid on the frontier settlement of Cobleskill, New York on May 30, 1778. The battle took place in what is now the hamlet of Warnerville, New York, near the modern Cobleskill-Richmondville High School. The raid marked the beginning of a phase in which Loyalists and Haudenosaunee, encouraged and supplied by British authorities in the Province of Quebec, attacked and destroyed numerous villages on what was then the western frontier of New York and Pennsylvania.

A small party of Haudenosaunee entered Cobleskill and drew the local defenders into a trap set by a much larger party of Haudenosaunee and Loyalists under the command of Joseph Brant. After killing a number of the regulars and militia, and driving off the remainder, Brant's forces destroyed much of the settlement. Months later, regulars and militia commanded by Lieutenant Colonel William Butler retaliated against Brant's actions against Cobleskill and other communities by destroying two Haudenosaunee villages on the Susquehanna River. A year later, Continental Army forces razed 40 Haudenosaunee villages during the Sullivan Expedition.

== Background ==
Following the Battles of Saratoga and the failure of the campaign of British Lieutenant General John Burgoyne to gain control of the Hudson River valley, the Revolutionary War in upstate New York became a frontier war. British leaders in the Province of Quebec supported Loyalist and Native American partisan fighters with supplies and armaments. During the winter of 1777–78, Mohawk war leader Joseph Brant and Seneca war chief Sayenqueraghta developed plans to attack frontier settlements in New York and Pennsylvania. In February 1778, Brant established a base of operations at Onaquaga near present-day Windsor, New York. By the time he began his campaign in May 1778, he had recruited a mix of Haudenosaunee and Loyalist volunteers estimated to number between two and three hundred. One of his objectives was to acquire provisions for his forces and those of Major John Butler, who was planning an attack on the Wyoming Valley.

In 1778, the settlement of Cobleskill consisted of twenty families living on farms spread out along Cobleskill Creek. It was part of the Schoharie area which was a significant source of food for the Patriot war effort. Its principal defense was the small local militia under Captain Christian Brown. When attacks by the Haudenosaunee were rumored to be coming in the spring of 1778, the militia appealed for additional support. Continental Army Colonel Ichabod Alden sent a company of thirty to forty men from his 7th Massachusetts Regiment under Captain William Patrick to reinforce the militia.

== Battle ==
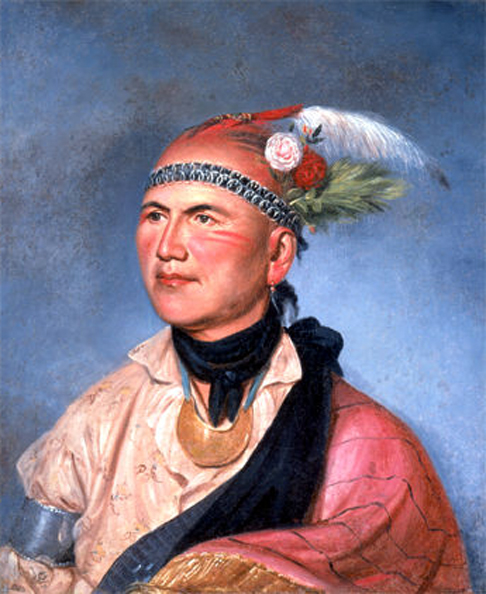
Joseph Brant, portrait by Charles Willson Peale

On the morning of May 30, Brant laid a trap for Cobleskill's defenders. He sent forward a small number of his warriors as a lure. Captain Patrick's regulars and the local militia spotted them near the southern edge of the settlement. Despite Captain Brown's warning that the enemy might be setting a trap, Patrick pressed forward as the warriors withdrew, engaging them in a running battle. Patrick continued the pursuit for roughly a mile. Brant sprung his trap and Patrick's company was engulfed by Brant's larger force. Both Patrick and his second-in-command were killed in the battle, as was about half of their men. Brown rallied the remaining forces and began a fighting withdrawal back to the settlement. Five men took refuge in the house of George Warner which the attackers set on fire, killing all five. A total of 22 regulars and militia were killed, eight were wounded, and five were captured. The bodies of Patrick and some of the others were later found horribly mutilated. The postwar claim that Brant's force suffered 25 killed has been called "highly dubious" by Canadian historian Gavin Watt.

== Aftermath ==
During the battle, the inhabitants of Cobleskill fled their homes and escaped. Brant and his men burned ten houses as well as their associated outbuildings before withdrawing. Any horses or cattle that they could not bring with them were killed.

One of the prisoners from the 7th Massachusetts, Lieutenant Jonathan Maynard, later claimed that Brant spared his life. According to Maynard, Brant's warriors were preparing to torture and burn their captives when Brant noticed the Masonic symbols marked in ink on Maynard's arms. Brant stayed the executions and Maynard and the others were taken as prisoners first to Fort Niagara, and later to Montreal. He was exchanged in December 1780. Maynard's account is related in William Denslow's 10,000 Famous Freemasons along with stories of five other masons who were likewise saved by Brant during the war.

Brant continued recruiting Loyalist and Indigenous volunteers, and raiding frontier communities in the Mohawk and Schoharie valleys. New York Governor George Clinton, who had been considering operations against Onaquaga, enlarged those plans after the raid on Cobleskill and Brant's attack on German Flatts in September. In October 1778 Continental and militia forces destroyed Onaquaga and Unadilla, another Indigenous village that supported Brant and Butler. In November, Cherry Valley was the scene of a massacre by forces led in part by Brant.

The settlers of Cobleskill who were rendered destitute by the action received £200 in compensation for their troubles. Settlers from many smaller communities in the area began withdrawing to larger, better fortified communities like Cherry Valley (which began construction of a fort after the raid) and Schenectady. This action and later ones by Brant and Butler contributed to the decision by the Continental Congress to authorize a major Continental Army expedition into Haudenosaunee territory. Commanded by Generals John Sullivan and James Clinton, the 1779 expedition systematically destroyed the villages of Haudenosaunee tribes fighting for the British, but did little to stop the frontier war.
