= Warnerville, New York =

Warnerville
- hamlet
- Location of Warnerville in New York
- Coordinates: 42°39′42″N 74°30′17.5″W
- Country: United States
- State: New York
- County: Schoharie
- ZIP code: 12187

Warnerville is a hamlet in Schoharie County, New York, United States. Located along State Route 7 between Cobleskill and Richmondville, it is the municipality containing the majority of the sites of the Battle of Cobleskill.

On June 10, 1778, after receiving reliable reports of May's Cobleskill Massacre, the Board of War of the Continental Congress concluded that a major Indian war was in the offing. This would result in the funding from the Continental Congress and orders of General George Washington that launched the punitive 1779 Sullivan Expedition, which burned at least 40 Amerindian towns and villages whilst capturing or destroying great stores of foods.

Warnerville is today the site of the Cobleskill/Richmondville High School and has a post office with the ZIP Code of 12187.

== Notable person ==
- Solomon Warner (1811–1899), Mississippi River boatman, California pioneer, first American merchant in Tucson, Arizona
