= Attack on German Flatts (1778) =

Part of the American Revolutionary War

Coordinates: 43°1′34″N 74°59′25″W

- Part of the American Revolutionary War
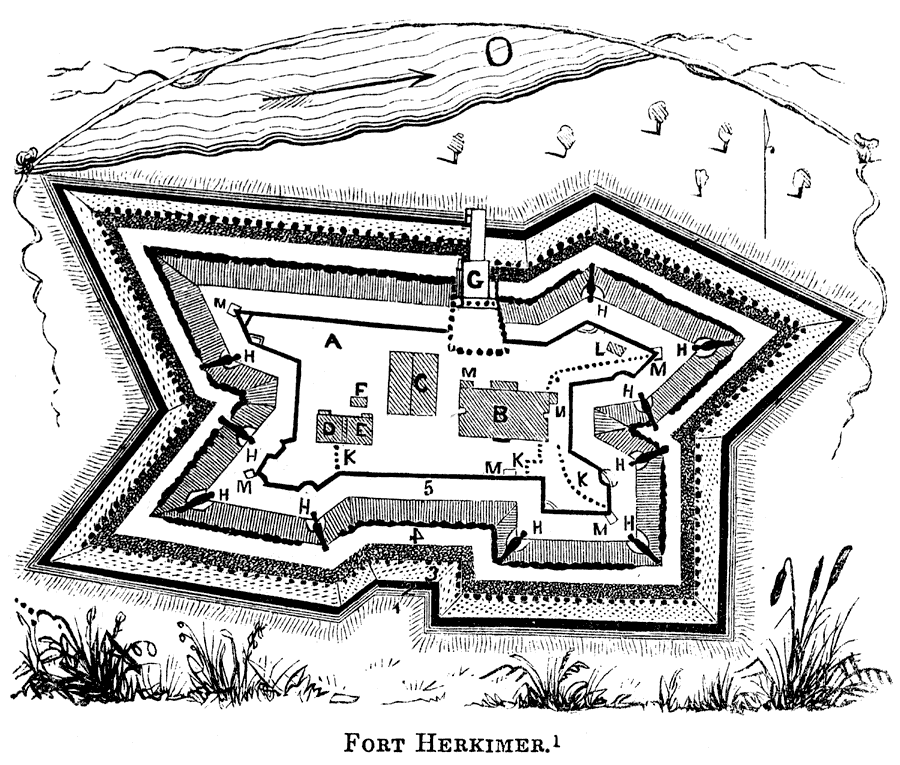
- Fort Herkimer, drawing probably by Benson Lossing
Date	September 17, 1778
Location	Herkimer, New York
Result	British-Haudenosaunee victory

Belligerents
United States	Great Britain; Haudenosaunee

Commanders and leaders
Peter Bellinger	Joseph Brant; William Caldwell

Strength
Tryon County militia	152 Haudenosaunee; 200–300 Loyalists

Casualties and losses
3 killed	Not reported

The attack on German Flatts (September 17, 1778) was a raid on the frontier settlement of German Flatts, New York (which then also encompassed what is now Herkimer) during the American Revolutionary War. The attack was made by a mixed force of Loyalists and Haudenosaunee (Iroquois) under the overall command of Mohawk leader Joseph Brant, and resulted in the destruction of houses, barns, and crops, and the taking of livestock for the raiders' use. The settlers, warned by the heroic run of Adam Helmer, took refuge in local forts but were too militarily weak to stop the raiders.

Brant's attack was one of a series executed under his command or that of Loyalist and Seneca leaders against communities on what was then the frontier of western New York and northern Pennsylvania. New York authorities responded by ordering an expedition that destroyed Brant's forward operating bases in Haudenosaunee territory.

== Background ==
With the failure of British General John Burgoyne's campaign to the Hudson after the Battles of Saratoga in October 1777, the American Revolutionary War in upstate New York became a frontier war. British leaders in the Province of Quebec supported Loyalist and Native American partisan fighters with supplies and armaments. During the winter of 1777–78 Brant and other British-allied Indians developed plans to attack frontier settlements in New York and Pennsylvania. In February 1778 Brant established a base of operations at Onaquaga (present-day Windsor, New York). He recruited a mix of Haudenosaunee and Loyalists estimated to number between two and three hundred by the time he began his campaign in late May. One of his objectives was to acquire provisions for his forces and those of John Butler, who was planning operations in the Susquehanna River valley. His first expedition was a raid on Cobleskill, and he raided other frontier communities throughout the summer.

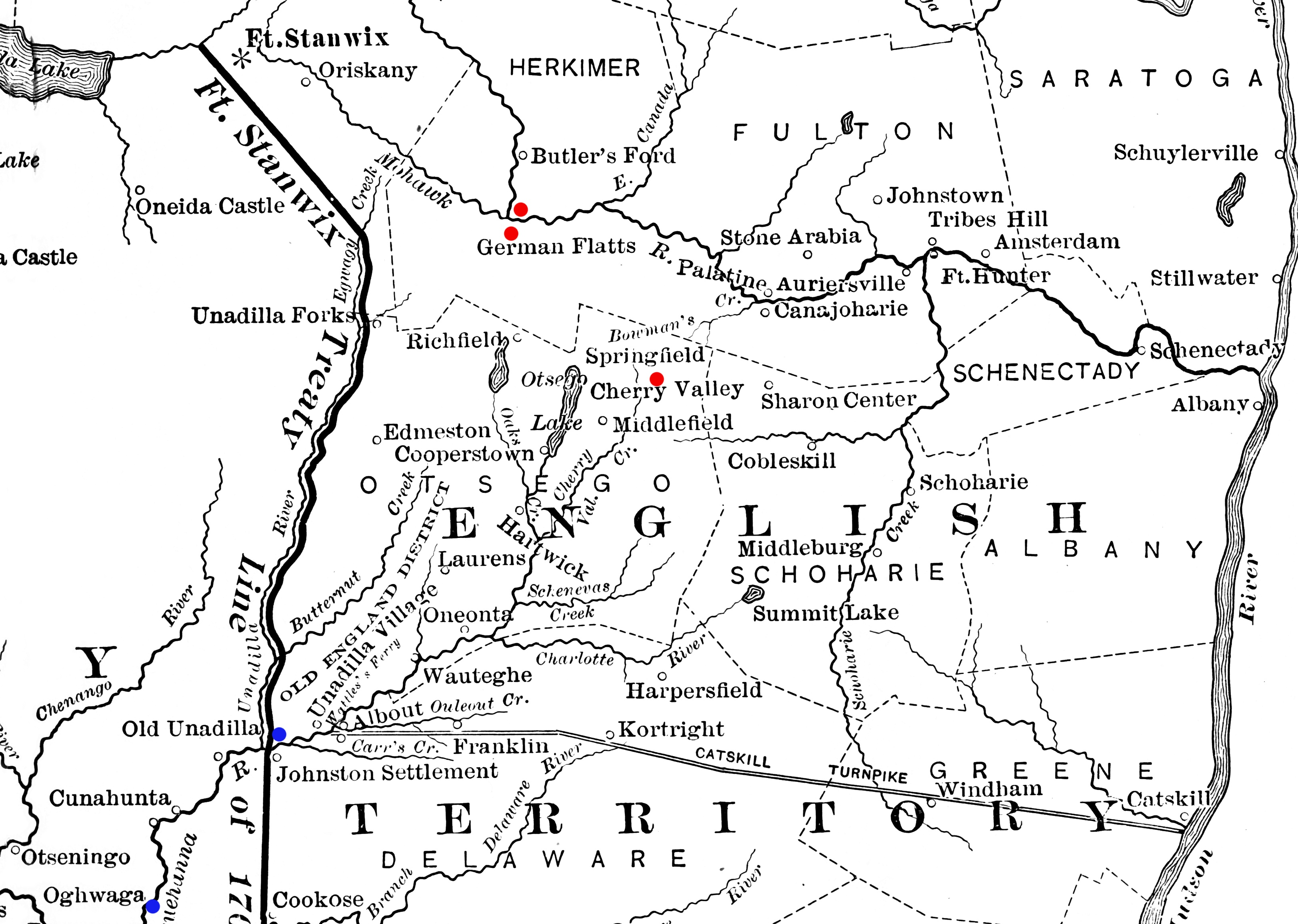
Map detail showing the New York frontier. The two forts are marked in red on either side of the Mohawk River, as is Cherry Valley. The Indian towns of Unadilla and Onaquaga (spelled "Oghwaga" on the map) are marked in blue.

When he raided settlements at Springfield and Andrustown (present-day Jordanville) in July, Brant left the survivors with warnings that German Flatts would soon also be attacked. The settlement of German Flatts (now known as Herkimer due to a survey error in 1788 that reversed the names of Herkimer and what is now German Flatts on the south bank of the Mohawk River) was founded in 1723 by Palatine German immigrants. The district was defended by a local militia regiment under the command of Colonel Peter Bellinger. There were two main forts, Fort Dayton and Fort Herkimer, on either side of the Mohawk.

== Prelude ==
Although Brant had planned on raiding German Flatts sooner than September, the absence of John Butler delayed his plans. Butler had returned to Fort Niagara after his attack on the Wyoming Valley communities in July, sending Captain William Caldwell to Unaquaga to recruit men for the unit known as Butler's Rangers. By early September it was clear that Butler was not returning to the area, so Brant and Caldwell launched the expedition with the men they had. The exact composition of the force that left Unadilla is unclear. Sources generally agree that 152 Haudenosaunee, principally Mohawk, were in the force, but that the Loyalists (in either Caldwell's Ranger company or in Brant's company of volunteers) numbered between 200 and 300.

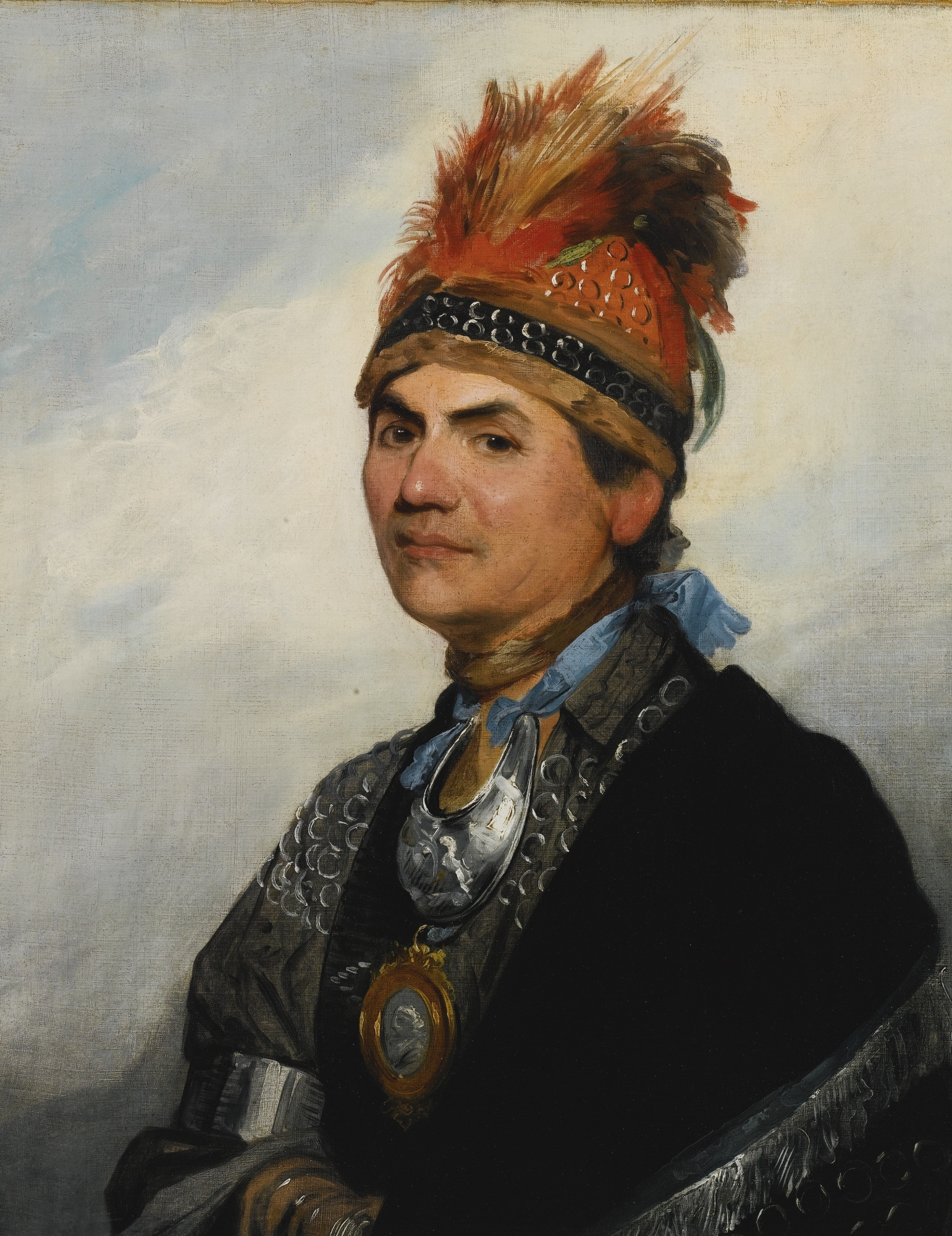
Joseph Brant, portrait by Gilbert Stuart

Because of warnings received earlier that Brant was planning an attack, Colonel Bellinger had been sending out scouts in the direction of Unadilla to gather intelligence. On September 16 Brant's company overwhelmed a scouting party of nine, killing a few and scattering the rest. One of the survivors was Adam Helmer, who ran 26 miles (42 km) ahead of the advancing force to warn German Flatts. Colonel Bellinger sounded the call to arms of his regiment and sent an urgent request to Colonel Jacob Klock for the assistance of his regiment, while the settlers took refuge in the forts.

== Raid ==
Caldwell, Brant, and their men arrived at German Flatts not long after Helmer's warning, on the evening of September 16, and began their attack the next morning. Because the settlers had taken refuge in the forts, there was no significant opportunity for the raiders to take prisoners or scalps. They demonstrated before the forts, but lacked heavy weapons with which to properly assault them. They instead rampaged through the communities on both sides of the Mohawk, destroying 63 homes, a similar number of barns, three grist mills, and one saw mill. They drove off a large number of horses, cattle, and sheep, killing those they could not take with them. The only buildings left standing were the forts, a barn, the church, and the homes of the minister and a few Loyalists. More than 700 people were made homeless by their destruction. Because of Helmer's warning only three Americans were killed. Captain Caldwell wrote that his men "would have in all probability killed most of the inhabitants of German Flatts had they not been apprised of our coming by one of the scouts getting in and warning of our approach, and perhaps got to their forts".

== Aftermath ==
Klock's regiment did not arrive until after the raiders had left. The militia pursued the raiders, but were unable to catch up with them. Some friendly Oneidas and Tuscaroras, however, capitalized on Brant's absence from Unadilla to raid that town, freeing prisoners that Brant had taken while en route to German Flatts.

The Americans launched retaliatory raids in early October that destroyed Unadilla and Onaquaga. Brant and John Butler's son Walter organized a retaliatory expedition against Cherry Valley, which was the scene of a massacre in November. This action and others by Brant and Butler contributed to the decision by the Continental Congress to authorize a major Continental Army expedition into Haudenosaunee territory. Commanded by Generals John Sullivan and James Clinton, the 1779 expedition systematically destroyed the villages of Haudenosaunee tribes fighting for the British, but did little to stop the frontier war. The German Flatts area in particular was the subject of repeated raids.

Walter D. Edmonds' 1936 novel Drums Along the Mohawk recounts the story of Adam Helmer's run and gives an overview of the German settlements along the river. It was adapted as a film by the same name, directed by John Ford and released in 1939.
