= Solomon Warner =

American businessman and pioneer (1811–1899)

Solomon Warner (February 8, 1811 – November 14, 1899) was an American businessman and pioneer who participated in the creation of the Arizona Territory.

== Biography ==
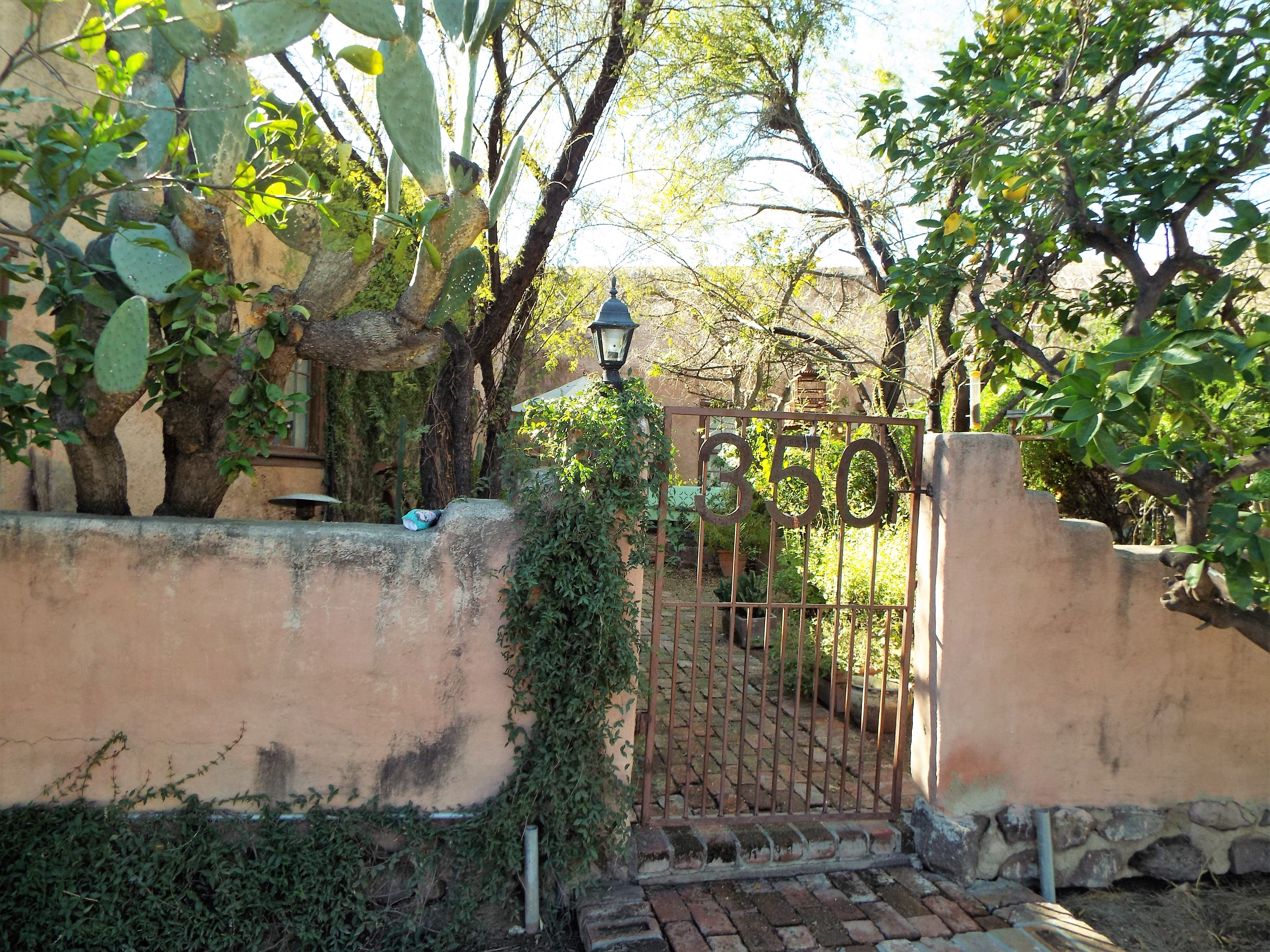
The Solomon Warner House in Tucson, Arizona

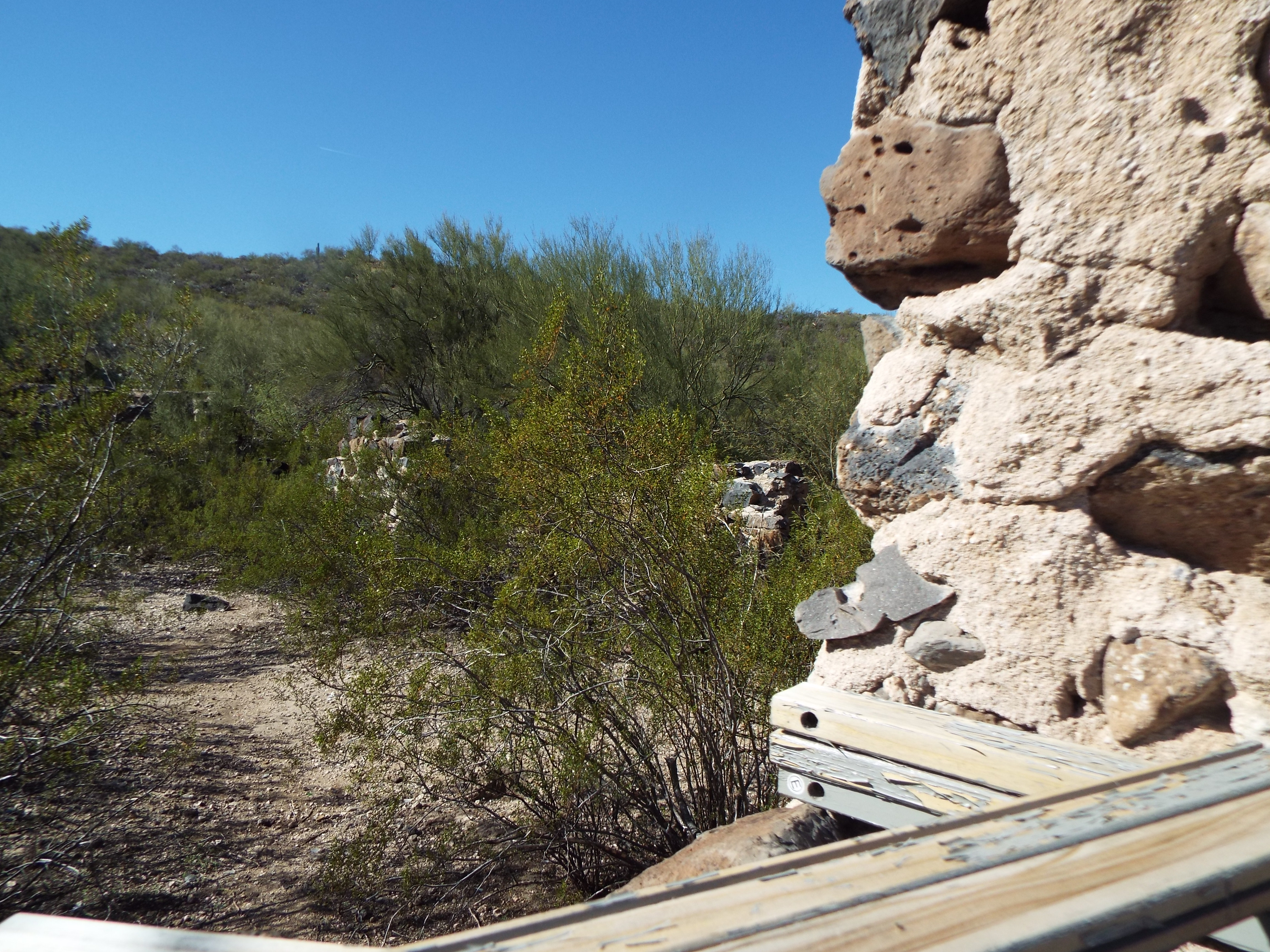
Ruins of the Solomon Warner Mill

Warner was born in Warnerville, New York, on February 8, 1811. When he was 26, he went to work on river boats plying the Mississippi River. In 1849 he joined the California Gold Rush, moving to Sonora, California. Two years later he journeyed to the Isthmus of Panama before taking work in Nicaragua. In 1853, Warner moved to San Francisco, California, and his work as a mason for the Quartermaster Corps took him to Fort Yuma on January 13, 1855.

While at Fort Yuma, Warner became involved with two merchants, William F. Hooper and Francis Hinton. This association led him to lead a 13-mule train loaded with merchandise for Tucson. He arrived in the settlement on February 29, 1856, eleven days before Mexican troops permanently withdrew from the area in accordance with the terms of the Gadsden Purchase. Upon his arrival he purchased plots of land within the town limits. Warner then partnered with Mark Aldrich in opening a store, becoming the town's first merchant to sell goods originating from the United States.

Warner, known as "Don Solomon" to the Mexican locals, initially prospered in his role as a shopkeeper. This changed after the beginning of the American Civil War. When Confederate troops arrived in Tucson, Warner refused to take a loyalty oath. This resulted in his property being seized and Warner being forced to flee town. He spent the war in Santa Cruz, Sonora, where he met and married a wealthy widow.

Following the war, Warner returned to Tucson where his wife's money allowed him to expand his business ventures. During a journey from Santa Cruz to Tucson on January 29, 1870, he was wounded by Apache and permanently crippled. Between 1874 and 1875 he built a flour mill and small dam along the Santa Cruz river. He was also involved in farming and cattle ranching. The flour mill proved to be unprofitable and he shut it down in 1881.

He spent his final years attempting to build a perpetual motion machine. His obsession with this effort was such that he neglected to eat and sleep properly to spend more time on the venture. Warner died from cancer in Tucson on November 14, 1899. He is buried in Tucson's Holy Hope Cemetery. Tucson's Warner Street, also known as Warner Alley, is named in his honor.

In May 2018 a pair of jeans owned by him sold for almost $100,000.
