= Brant's Volunteers =

Volunteer company of Loyalists auxiliaries

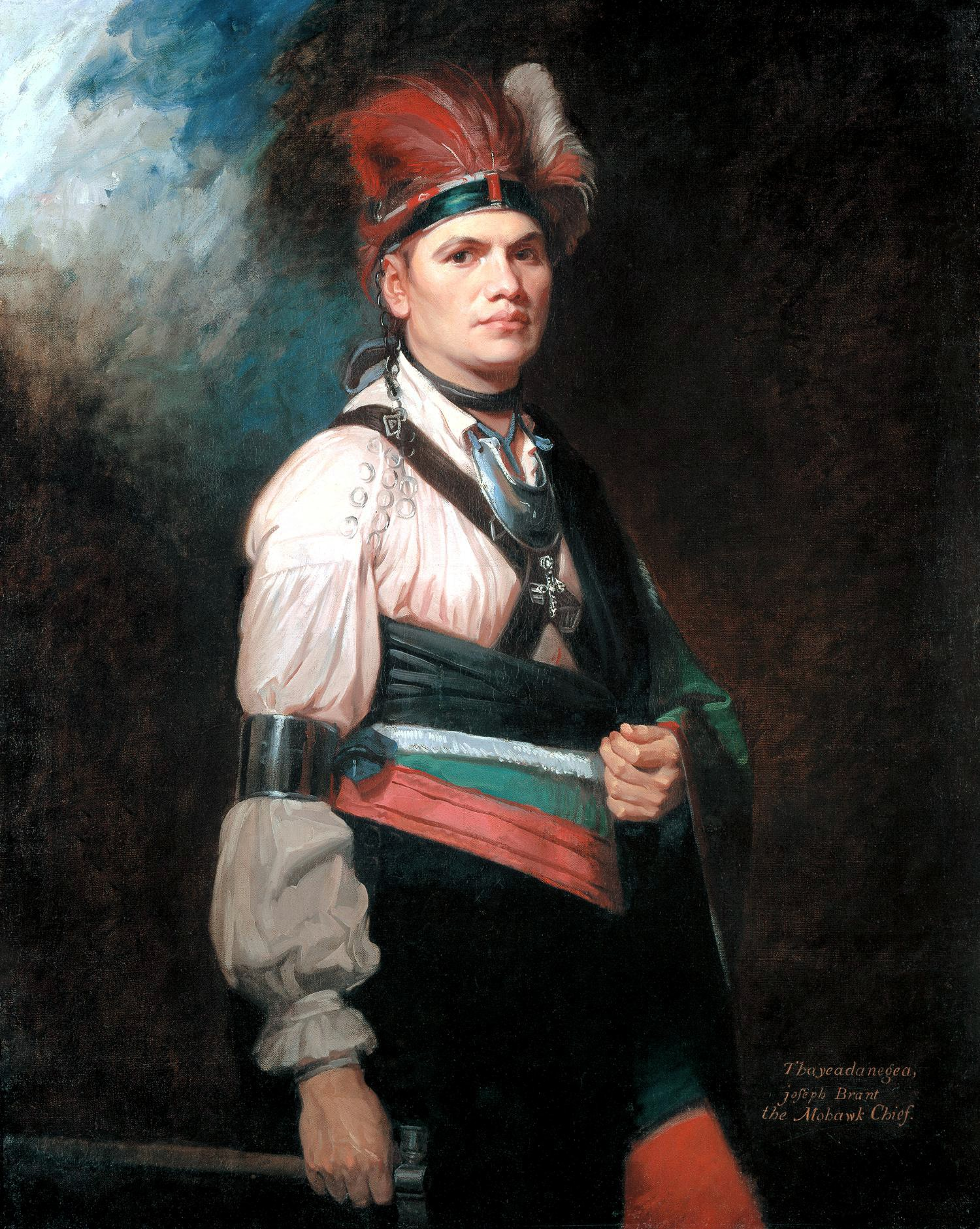
- Joseph Brant and his Loyalist and Indigenous volunteers raided settlements on the frontier of New York during the American Revolutionary War.
- Active: 1777-1783
- Country: Kingdom of Great Britain
- Allegiance: Kingdom of Great Britain
- Branch: Loyalist associators
- Type: Independent rangers (auxiliaries)
- Role: Special operations, guerrilla warfare, light infantry
- Size: 100-300
- Equipment: Mixed arms (Brown Bess muskets, hunting rifles, tomahawks, scalping knives)
- Engagements: American Revolutionary War: Siege of Fort Stanwix (1777); Battle of Oriskany (1777); Battle of Cobleskill (1778); Attack on German Flatts (1778); Cherry Valley Massacre (1778); Battle of Minisink (1779); Battle of Klock's Field (1780); Lochry's Defeat (1781)

Commanders
- Notable commanders: Captain Joseph Brant

Brant's Volunteers, also known as Joseph Brant's Volunteers, were an irregular unit of Loyalist and Indigenous volunteers raised during the American Revolutionary War by Mohawk war leader, Joseph Brant (Mohawk: Thayendanegea). Brant's Volunteers fought on the side of the British on the frontier of New York and in the Ohio Country. As associators they were not provided uniforms, weapons, provisions, or pay by the British government, and survived by foraging and plundering.

== Formation and history ==
Brant began recruiting Mohawk and Loyalist volunteers in 1777 from his base at Onaquaga. The initial size of his guerrilla company was about 100 men. About 20 were Mohawk allies of the British, and about 80 were Loyalists. Later in the war, Brant was able to attract a larger number of Indigenous warriors to his unit, which grew to over 300 members. The Loyalists were mostly of English, Scottish, and Irish descent recruited from the upper Susquehanna and Delaware river valleys.

Although Brant received a captain's commission in the Six Nations Indian Department in 1780, other members of the group were Loyalist and Indigenous associators (volunteers). They were not paid by the British, and relied upon plunder and foraging for their compensation. Brant often needed to purchase supplies for his volunteers on credit. In 1779, Governor Frederick Haldimand authorized clothing, rations, and medical care, but no monetary payments. Since the unit had no official recognition, many Loyalist members later transferred to Butler's Rangers or the King's Royal Regiment of New York.

Brant's Volunteers participated in the 1777 Siege of Fort Stanwix and the Battle of Oriskany. They fought in 1778 at the Battle of Cobleskill and the Attack on German Flatts. Following the destruction of Onaquaga by Lieutenant Colonel William Butler in October 1778, Brant moved his base of operations to Fort Niagara. Brant's Volunteers were part of the expedition to Cherry Valley, however, most of them refused to participate in the actual attack because of how they had been treated by the expedition's commander, Captain Walter Butler of Butler's Rangers.

In 1779, Brant's Volunteers defeated the American militia at the Battle of Minisink, but were brushed aside by the Continental Army at the Battle of Newtown. In 1780, Brant and his volunteers destroyed Kanonwalohale, the principal village of the pro-American Oneidas, and participated in a large-scale raid on the Schoharie Creek and Mohawk River valleys that culminated in the inconclusive Battle of Klock's Field. The following year Brant operated in the Ohio Country and in August participated in a successful ambush of a detachment of Brigadier General George Rogers Clark's army.

== Uniforms ==
Lacking uniforms, Brant's Loyalist volunteers frequently dressed and painted themselves as Indigenous warriors. When they wore civilian clothing in battle, Brant had them attach yellow lace to their hats so they could be easily identified as Loyalists.

== Post-war ==
By late 1783, just 15 Loyalists remained with Brant's Volunteers. Many of these later settled with Joseph Brant and the Mohawk on the reserve established in 1784 along the Grand River in what is now Ontario.
