= Windsor, New York =

- Town
- Seal

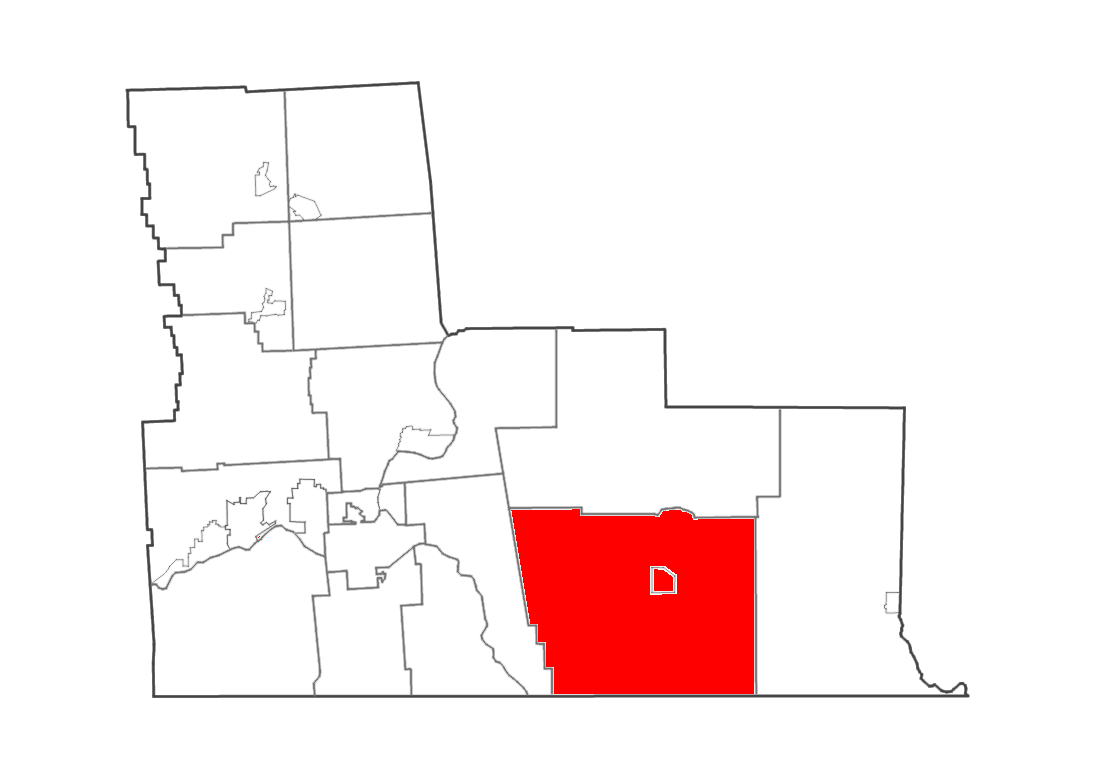
- Location in Broome County

- Location within New York Location within the United States
- Coordinates: 42°4′33″N 75°38′25″W
- Country: United States
- State: New York
- County: Broome

Government
  - Type: Town Council
  - Town Supervisor: Mark Odell
  - Town Council: Members' List: • William McIntyre; • Lesa Hawk-Shuler; • Gary Hupman; • Mark Odell

Area
  - Total: 93.01 sq mi (240.89 km^{2})
  - Land: 91.75 sq mi (237.64 km^{2})
  - Water: 1.25 sq mi (3.24 km^{2})
- Elevation: 973 ft (297 m)

Population (2020)
  - Total: 5,804
  - Density: 68/sq mi (26.4/km^{2})
- Time zone: UTC−5 (Eastern (EST))
  - Summer (DST): UTC−4
- ZIP Codes: 13865 (Windsor); 13795 (Kirkwood); 13826 (Ouaquaga)
- FIPS code: 36-82535
- GNIS feature ID: 979649
- Website: townofwindsorny.gov

Windsor is a town in Broome County, New York, United States. The population was 5,804 at the 2020 census.

The town is on the southern border of the county and is east of Binghamton. The town includes the village of Windsor, located on the Susquehanna River.

== History ==
This area along the Susquehanna had long been settled by varying cultures of indigenous peoples, including those of the historic Iroquois Confederacy, who used the river for transportation, water and fishing. Around 1712 remnants of the Tuscarora tribe settled in the northern part of the town. Also an Iroquoian-speaking people, they had migrated from North Carolina, which they left because of warfare with English colonists and other tribes. In 1722, the Tuscarora were accepted by the Iroquois as the Sixth Nation of their political confederacy.

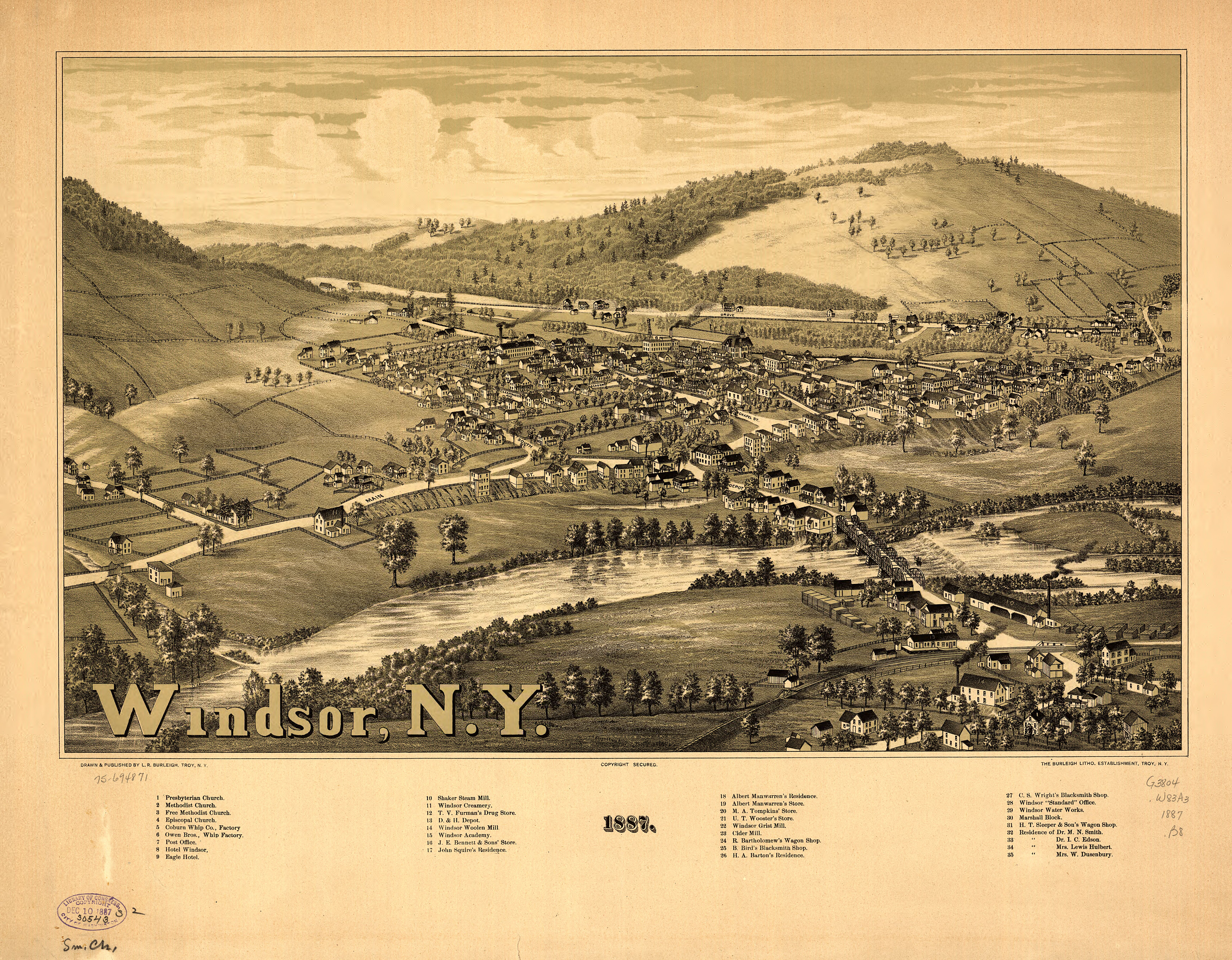
Lithograph of Windsor from 1887 by L.R. Burleigh including a list of landmarks

Their fortified village, Onaquaga, was an outpost of the British Colonies. A mission had been established there by the Indian Superintendent, Sir William Johnson. Mohawk and other allies of the British also became established there. Joseph Brant used it as a base for his Volunteers, which fought with the British during the American Revolutionary War. In retaliation for joint British and Iroquois raids on frontier communities, the Continental Army attacked and destroyed Onaquaga in October 1778.

It was 1785 before the region was settled again by new migrants, many of whom were Yankees from New England and veterans of the war. They formed the town of Windsor in 1807, the year following the formation of Broome County, from the town of Chenango. The town was reduced in size by the creation of two other new towns in 1821: Sanford and Colesville. In 1851, a small part of Windsor was used to help form the town of Conklin. For years the economy was based on agriculture.

== Geography ==
According to the United States Census Bureau, the town of Windsor has a total area of 93.0 square miles (240.9 km^{2}), of which 91.7 square miles (237.6 km^{2}) is land and 1.3 square miles (3.3 km^{2}), or 1.36%, is water.

The southern town line is the border of Pennsylvania. The Susquehanna River flows southward through the town.

New York State Route 17 and Interstate 86 is a major highway crossing the town from east to west. New York State Route 79, a north-south highway, intersects NY-17 at Windsor village.

== Demographics ==
Historical population
Census	Pop.	Note	%±
1820	3,354		—
1830	2,175		−35.2%
1840	2,368		8.9%
1850	2,645		11.7%
1860	2,672		1.0%
1870	2,958		10.7%
1880	3,286		11.1%
1890	3,035		−7.6%
1900	2,967		−2.2%
1910	2,495		−15.9%
1920	2,137		−14.3%
1930	2,183		2.2%
1940	2,625		20.2%
1950	2,974		13.3%
1960	4,373		47.0%
1970	5,646		29.1%
1980	5,911		4.7%
1990	6,440		8.9%
2000	6,421		−0.3%
2010	6,274		−2.3%
2020	5,804		−7.5%
U.S. Decennial Census

As of the census of 2000, there were 6,421 people, 2,339 households, and 1,744 families residing in the town. The population density was 70.2 inhabitants per square mile (27.1/km^{2}). There were 2,793 housing units at an average density of 30.5 per square mile (11.8/km^{2}). The racial makeup of the town was 97.93% White, 0.59% Black or African American, 0.28% Native American, 0.22% Asian, 0.05% Pacific Islander, 0.17% from other races, and 0.76% from two or more races. Hispanic or Latino of any race were 0.78% of the population.

There were 2,339 households, out of which 37.2% had children under the age of 18 living with them, 60.8% were married couples living together, 9.2% had a female householder with no husband present, and 25.4% were non-families. 20.1% of all households were made up of individuals, and 8.4% had someone living alone who was 65 years of age or older. The average household size was 2.74 and the average family size was 3.15.

In the town, the population was spread out, with 29.5% under the age of 18, 6.4% from 18 to 24, 29.0% from 25 to 44, 23.9% from 45 to 64, and 11.3% who were 65 years of age or older. The median age was 37 years. For every 100 females, there were 98.8 males. For every 100 females age 18 and over, there were 97.4 males.

The median income for a household in the town was $46,043, and the median income for a family was $61,028. Males had a median income of $41,224 versus $35,028 for females. The per capita income for the town was $28,182. About 4.2% of families and 5.9% of the population were below the poverty line, including 9.1% of those under age 18 and 5.8% of those age 65 or over.

== Communities and locations in the town of Windsor ==
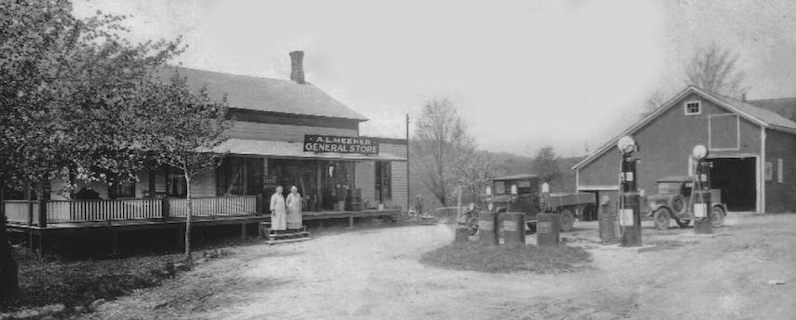
Meeker General Store in West Windsor (1916)

- Blatchley– A hamlet in the southwestern corner of the town.
- Cascade Valley – A hamlet near the southern town line.
- Damascus – A hamlet southeast of Windsor village on County Road 28, served by Exit 80 of NY-17.
- Dunbar – A hamlet in the northwestern part of the town.
- East Windsor – A hamlet northeast of Windsor village on County Road 233.
- Edson – A hamlet south of Windsor village.
- Flowers – A hamlet southwest of Windsor village.
- Hawkins Pond Park – A park at the southern town line.
- Lester – A location in the western part of the town.
- Occanum – A hamlet west of Windsor village, served by Exit 78 of NY-17.
- South Windsor – A hamlet south of Windsor village on NY Route 79.
- State Line – A hamlet near the Pennsylvania border on Route 79.
- Wake – A location near the eastern town line.
- West Windsor – A hamlet near the western town line on NY-17 at the junction of County Road 217; access from NY-17's Exit 77.
- Windsor – The village of Windsor is located by the Susquehanna River near the center of the town, with access from Exit 79 of NY-17. The village is the largest community in the town.

== Notable people ==
- Joel Bennett, former Major League Baseball pitcher
- Joseph Brant, Mohawk leader during the American Revolutionary War
- Joseph H. Brownell, member of the New York State Assembly
- Jedediah M. Grant, leader and Apostle of the Church of Jesus Christ of Latter-day Saints
- James Hard, the last verified living Union combat veteran of the American Civil War
- Giles W. Hotchkiss, former US congressman
- Ralph Hungerford, 33rd Governor of American Samoa
- Brian Weaver, retired professional racing driver
- Douglas H. Wheelock, US Army officer, NASA astronaut
