= Ichabod Alden =

American military officer (1739-1778)

- Born: August 11, 1739; Duxbury, Massachusetts, British America
- Died: November 11, 1778 (aged 39); Cherry Valley, New York, United States of America
- Military career
- Allegiance: United States of America
- Branch: Continental Army
- Service years: 1775–1778
- Rank: Colonel
- Units: Plymouth militia regiment 25th Continental Regiment
- Commands: 7th Massachusetts Regiment
- Conflicts: American Revolutionary War; Siege of Boston; Cherry Valley massacre †

Ichabod Alden (August 11, 1739 – November 11, 1778) was an American Revolutionary War officer and commanding officer during the Cherry Valley Massacre.

== Early life and family ==
The great-grandson of the Mayflower pilgrim John Alden, Ichabod Alden was born in Duxbury, Massachusetts.

== Career ==
Appointed lieutenant colonel of the Plymouth militia regiment in 1775, Alden first saw action serving with the 25th Continental Regiment during the Siege of Boston. Following his promotion to colonel in November 1776, Alden was assigned to the 7th Massachusetts Regiment. The regiment was stationed at Cherry Valley, New York in the summer of 1778. Although commanding 200–300 men, Alden's limited military experience and lack of knowledge regarding Indigenous tactics would prove to be a great disadvantage. He and several of his officers billeted well away from the fort in the homes of some of the inhabitants. Despite receiving a warning of an impeding attack from the American allied Oneida, Alden made few preparations.

On November 11, 1778, a combined force of 320 Seneca led by Cornplanter and Little Beard, 150 Butler's Rangers and a detachment of the 8th Regiment of Foot under Captain Walter Butler, and a small group of Mohawk led by Joseph Brant launched a surprise attack on Cherry Valley. While the Rangers and regulars blockaded Fort Alden, the Seneca rampaged through the village, killing and scalping 16 soldiers and 32 civilians, mostly women and children, and taking 70 captives. Alden was killed attempting to reach the fort from an outlying house. His second-in-command, Lieutenant Colonel William Stacy, was taken prisoner. The attack would later trigger an expedition led by Major General John Sullivan that destroyed 40 Seneca and Cayuga villages in the summer of 1779.
