= 7th Massachusetts Regiment =

American infantry regiment active 1776–1783

- Active: 1776–1783
- Allegiance: Continental Congress of the United States
- Type: Infantry
- Part of: Massachusetts Line
- Engagements: Saratoga; Cherry Valley massacre Sullivan Expedition

Commanders
- Notable commanders: Colonel Ichabod Alden; Colonel John Brooks; Lt. Col. William Stacy; Lt. Col. Daniel Whiting

The 7th Massachusetts Regiment was an infantry regiment of the Continental Army. It was constituted on 16 September 1776, and was originally known as Alden's Regiment after its first colonel, Ichabod Alden. It was organized as seven companies of volunteers from across Massachusetts, and Mayhew's company from the 25th Continental Regiment during the later months of 1776. The regiment was assigned to the Northern Department on 9 February 1777. It was reassigned to the Highland's Department on 13 March 1777. On 12 June 1777 it was assigned to 2nd Massachusetts Brigade and three days later, 15 June 1777, it was reassigned to the 1st Massachusetts Brigade. The brigade was reassigned to the Northern Department on 1 July 1777 and the regiment was relieved from the brigade on 31 March 1778. The regiment re-organized to nine companies on 25 September 1778 and reassigned to the Northern Department on 14 June 1779. The regiment was reassigned to the New Hampshire Brigade of the main army on 23 August 1779. On 14 November 1779, the regiment was reassigned to the 3d Massachusetts Brigade in the Highland Department. On 1 January 1781, the regiment was reassigned to the 1st Massachusetts Brigade. The regiment was furloughed on 12 June 1783 at West Point, New York and disbanded on 15 November 1783.

The regiment saw action at the Battles of Saratoga, the Cherry Valley massacre (in which Colonel Alden was killed and Lt. Col. William Stacy was captured), and the Sullivan Expedition.
