= Cobleskill–Richmondville Central School District =

School district in New York, United States

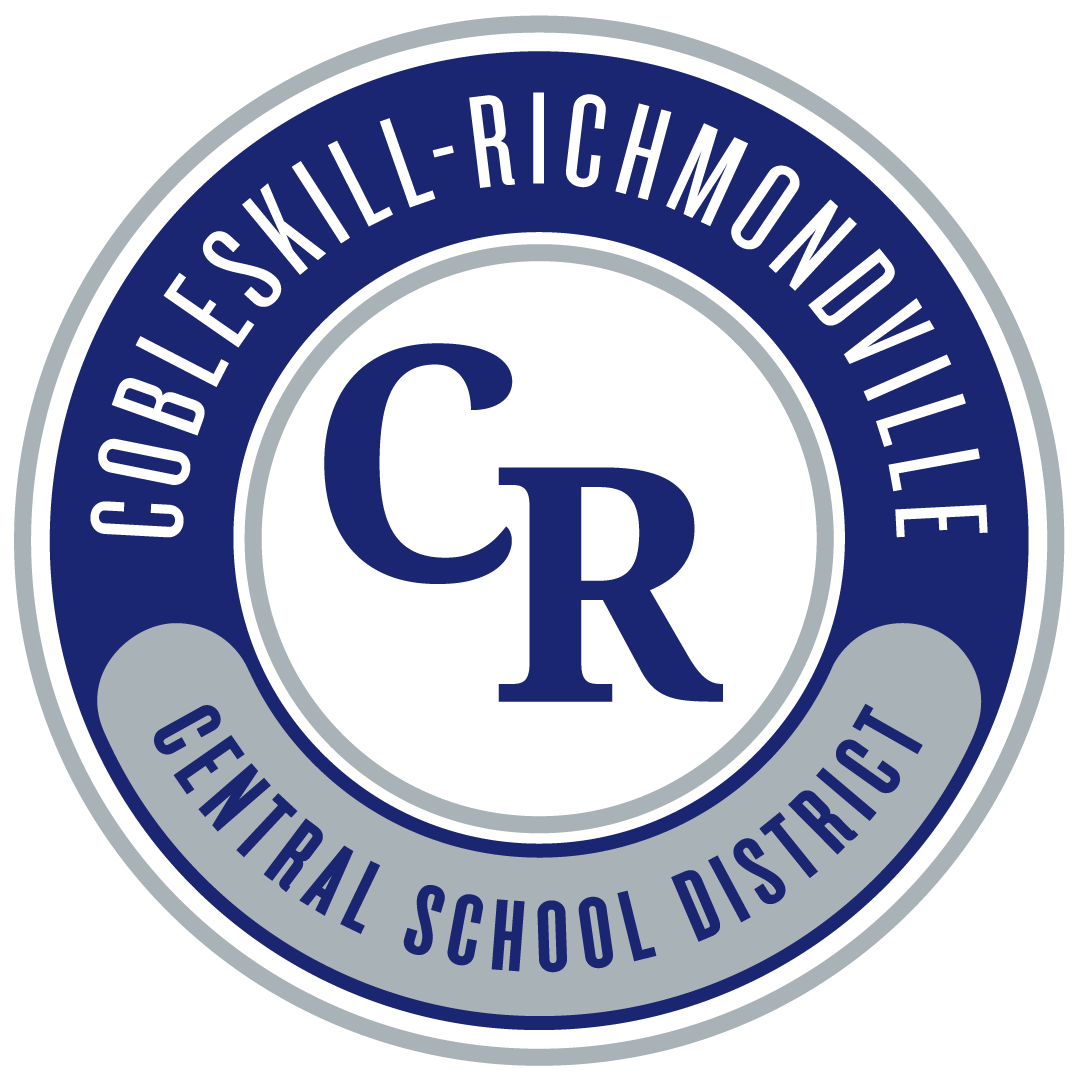

Location
- 155 Washington Ave. Cobleskill (Schoharie County), New York 12043 United States
- Coordinates: 42.679691°N 74.497669°W

District information
- Type: Public
- Grades: Prekindergarten to 12
- Established: 1993
- Superintendent: Matthew Sickles
- Schools: 4 (two primary, one middle and one secondary)
- Budget: $39,287,000 (2008–2009)
- NCES District ID: 3600010.

Students and staff
- Students: 2,064
- Teachers: 179.76 (on an FTE basis)
- Student–teacher ratio: 11.48
- District mascot: Bulldog
- Colors: Blue and Silver

Other information
- Website: www.crcsd.org

C-RCS or Cobleskill–Richmondville Central School District is a Public (government funded) school district in Schoharie County, New York. The district was formed in 1993 by the combination of the Richmondville Central School District and the Cobleskill Central School District. It consists of four schools: the Cobleskill Richmondville High School, the William H. Golding Middle School, the George D. Ryder Elementary School, and the Joseph B. Radez Elementary School. The current superintendent is Matthew Sickles.

== Schools ==
=== High school ===
The Cobleskill Richmondville High School was built in 1998 and has two floors. Both floors are mixes of core and encore classes. The school houses grades 9–12. The principal of this school is Brett Barr.

=== Middle school ===
The William H. Golding Middle School is the oldest school in the district, being dedicated in 1933 and houses grades 6–8. It has three floors, each having core and encore classes. The principal of this school is Jeremiah Haslun.

=== Ryder Elementary ===
The George D. Ryder Elementary School was dedicated in 1959 and used to house grades K–3. In 2004, the Golding Elementary School was built right next to the school and the two schools split, Ryder Elementary holding K–2 and Golding Elementary handling 3–5. In 2008, the two schools merged and now the school holds K–5. In 2011, all K–2 students will be going to Ryder. The principal of this school is Jessie Westfall.

=== Radez Elementary ===
The Joseph B. Radez Elementary School was constructed in 1933 and used to be the school for grades K–12 until Richmondville Central Schools joined with Cobleskill Central Schools in 1993. Then it held grades K–5. In 2011 it became a 3–5 school. The principal of this school is Carey Raymond.

== The Budget Cuts of 2011 ==
Towards the end of the 2010– 2011, a significant cut in state aid to all school districts hit C-RCS very hard. Many cuts had to be made, eliminating many sports teams, extracurricular activities, and teachers. In the middle school, the system of having two teams per grade level was ended. In the elementary schools, a significant shift caused all Kindergarten through second grade students to attend Ryder, and all third through fifth graders to attend Radez. This should make it easier for teachers to share resources, and therefore save money. The district has not commented on how long it plans to keep this system in place. Declining enrollment is also a serious problem facing the district, and the school board had talked about closing either Ryder or Radez in the event that state aid is not restored within a few years, as fewer students would require only one elementary school.

Many groups have fundraised to try to restore some of the programs that had been cut. The orchestra program, which had seen some of the most extensive cuts in the district, was restored, and its only teacher at the time, Kevin Oates, was restored as a full-time teacher, instead of being laid off as was the original plan. (It is worth noting that Kevin Oates was later dismissed from his position after the 2012–2013 fiscal year.) The CRCS Booster Club, as well as an independent group known as Save Our Sports, worked collaboratively to restore all the sports that had been cut. The Booster Club announced that enough funds had been raised to restore all fall sports. More than twice the amount already raised is needed to restore all winter and spring sports.

== Sports ==
The district offers a variety of interscholastic sports, starting at the modified level in seventh grade, and continuing through Varsity in twelfth grade. They compete against other teams in the Colonial Council of Section 2.

This chart includes sports that were cut as part of the 2011 Budget Cuts, as the several outside groups are working to restore funding and maintain all sports through the 2011–2012 school year. Those sports that would have been eliminated are shown in italics.

Sport	Boys Teams	Girls Teams	Season
Baseball	Modified, Junior Varsity, Varsity	None	Spring
Basketball	7th Grade, 8th Grade, 9th Grade, Junior Varsity, Varsity	7th Grade, 8th Grade, 9th Grade, Junior Varsity, Varsity	Winter
Bowling	Varsity	Varsity	Winter
Cheerleading	Mixed Junior Varsity, Mixed Varsity	Mixed Junior Varsity, Mixed Varsity	Multiple
Cross Country	Mixed Modified, Mixed Varsity	Mixed Modified, Mixed Varsity	Fall
Football	7th Grade, 8th Grade, Junior Varsity, Varsity	Option to join boy's teams after fitness test.	Fall
Golf	Varsity	Junior Varsity	Fall
Track & Field	Mixed Modified Outdoor, Mixed Varsity Outdoor, Mixed Varsity Indoor	Mixed Modified Outdoor, Mixed Varsity Outdoor, Mixed Varsity Indoor	Outdoor- Spring; Indoor- Winter
Soccer	Modified, Junior Varsity, Varsity	Modified, Junior Varsity, Varsity	Fall
Softball	None	Modified, 9th Grade, Junior Varsity, Varsity	Spring
Tennis	Varsity	Junior Varsity, Varsity	Girls- Fall; Boys- Spring
Volleyball	Varsity	Modified, Junior Varsity, Varsity	Girls- Fall; Boys- Winter
Wrestling	Modified, 9th Grade, Junior Varsity, Varsity	Option to join boy's teams after fitness test.	Winter

There are a total of 50 sports teams across 13 sports (mixed teams count only once for both boys and girls, as they practice as one team).
