= Jacob George Klock =

American politician

Judge Jacob George Klock (1738–1814) was a judge, member of the assembly, and state senator for New York State.

He was born March 9, 1738, in Albany County, New York, the son of George Klock.

In 1777, he was a judge for Tryon County. He represented Tryon County in the New York State Assembly from September 1777 to 1778, and was a member of the New York State Senate from the western district from 1778 to 1785. He was on the New York State committee of forfeiture from 1779 to 1788. He was a judge of Montgomery County from 1778 to 1787.

He died September 8, 1814.
