= Raid on Unadilla and Onaquaga =

Series of military operations by Continental Army forces and New York militia

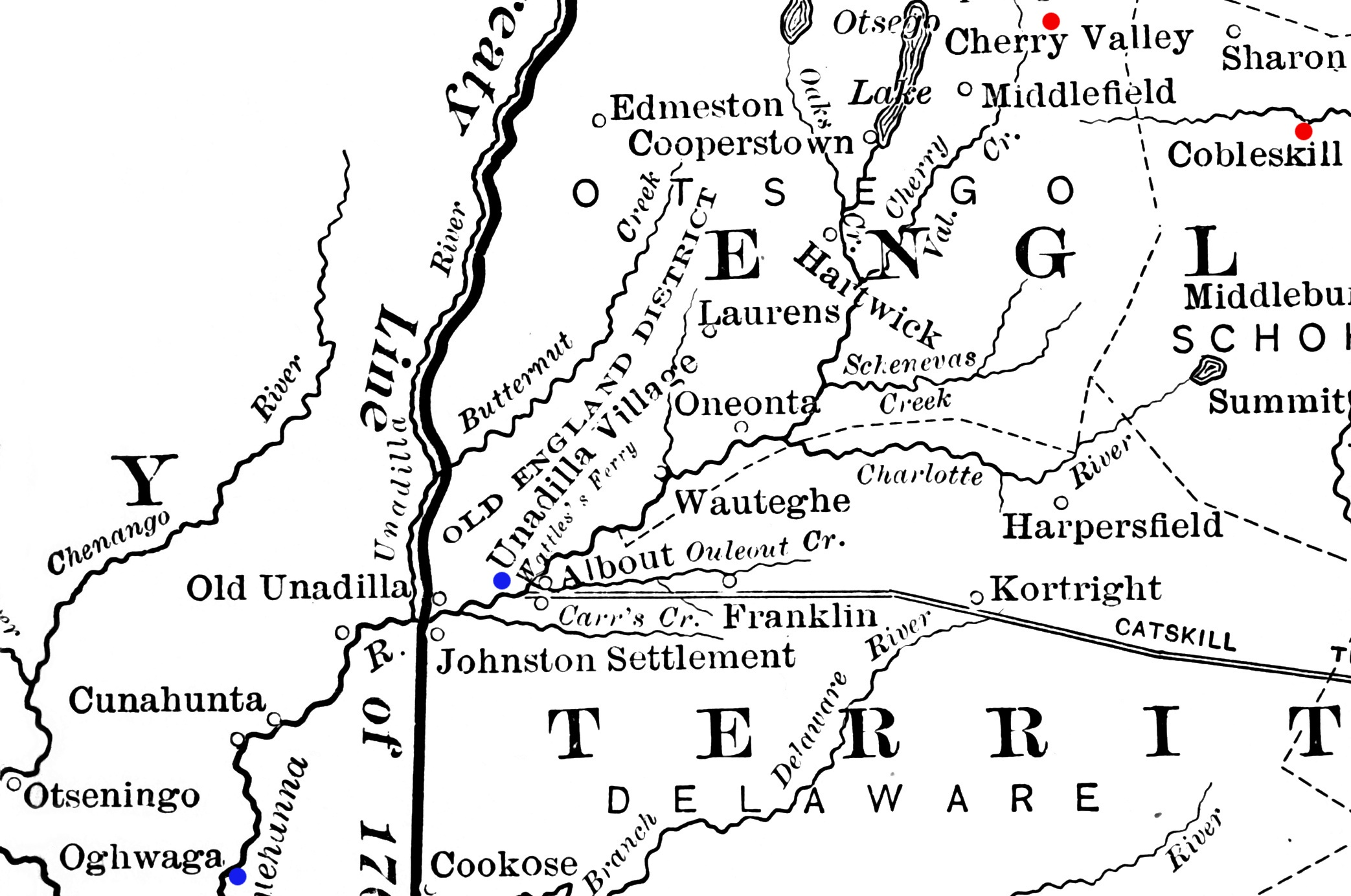
Map detail showing the western frontier of New York. Unadilla and Onaquaga (spelled "Oghwaga" on the map) are marked in blue.

The Raid on Unadilla and Onaquaga was a military operation by Continental Army forces and New York militia against the Haudenosaunee towns of Unadilla and Onaquaga in what is now upstate New York. In early October 1778, more than 250 men under the command of Lieutenant Colonel William Butler of the 4th Pennsylvania Regiment descended on the two hastily abandoned towns and destroyed them, razing most of the buildings and taking or destroying provisions, including the inhabitants' winter stores.

The raid was conducted in retaliation for a series of raids on frontier communities by Brant's Volunteers, led by Joseph Brant, and Butler's Rangers, under the command of Major John Butler, during the spring and summer of 1778. Unadilla was located in what is now the Village of Unadilla, Town of Unadilla, Otsego County, and Onaquaga was located in what is now the Town of Windsor, Broome County.

== Background ==
With the failure of British General John Burgoyne's campaign to control the Hudson Valley at the Battles of Saratoga in October 1777, the American Revolutionary War in upstate New York became a frontier war. During the winter of 1777–78, Major John Butler, Mohawk war leader Joseph Brant, and the leaders of the other British-allied Haudenosaunee developed plans to attack frontier settlements in New York and Pennsylvania.

In February 1778, Brant established a base of operations at Onaquaga (present-day Windsor, New York). He recruited a mix of Haudenosaunee and Loyalists estimated to number between two and three hundred by the time he began his campaign in May. One of his objectives was to acquire provisions for his forces and those of Major Butler, who was planning operations in the Susquehanna River valley. Brant began his campaign in late May with a raid on Cobleskill, and raided other frontier communities throughout the summer.

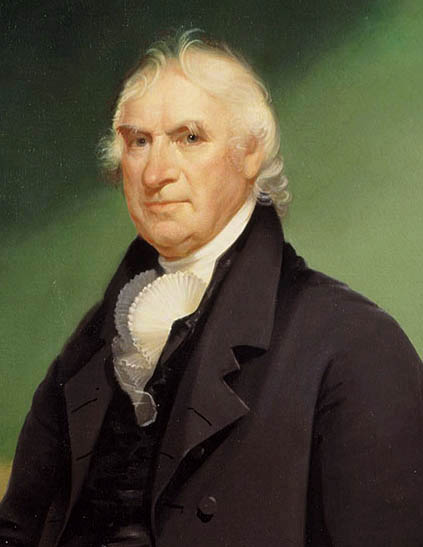
New York Governor George Clinton, portrait by Ezra Ames

The frontier settlers had difficulty responding to raids. The local militia were supported by some Continental Army regiments stationed in the area, but these forces generally could not mobilize in time to catch the raiders before they disappeared. Members of the militia frequently had to return to their farms to tend to their farms and livestock. New York Governor George Clinton and militia commander Brigadier General Abraham Ten Broeck considered mounting operations against the principal Haudenosaunee bases used by the raiders, Onaquaga and Unadilla, earlier in 1778, but it was not until an attack by Brant on the settlement of German Flatts in September that an expedition was organized.

In response to calls from Governor Clinton, General George Washington authorized the use of Continental Army forces, assigning the operation to Lieutenant Colonel William Butler of the 4th Pennsylvania Regiment. On September 20, Butler sent scouts to investigate conditions at the two towns. They returned with reports that Unadilla had a population of 300 and Onaquaga 400.

== Expedition ==
On October 2, Butler led a force of 267 men (214 Continentals and 53 militia) from the Schoharie Valley towards the two villages. Late in the day on October 6 the force reached the Unadilla area. Butler sent scouting parties out to take prisoners from outlying farms. As the force cautiously advanced toward the town, one of the scouts returned with a prisoner who reported that the community had been abandoned, with most of the inhabitants fleeing to Onaquaga. Butler detached some of his men to destroy the town while he marched with the rest toward Onaquaga. They reached the town late on October 8, and found it abandoned as well, apparently in great haste. Butler and his men spent the next two days destroying the towns. Butler described Onaquaga as "the finest Indian town I ever saw; on the both sides of the River there was about 40 good houses, Square logs, Shingles & stone Chimneys, good Floors, glass windows &c." All the homes were burned, as was the town's saw and grist mill, which was the only one in the area. Butler reported taking 49 horses and 52 head of cattle, and destroyed 4,000 bushels of grain. Operations were complicated by heavy rains that raised the water levels of the Susquehanna River. Butler's men had to build rafts to cross some of the river's tributaries to reach parts of the town. The expedition returned to Schoharie on October 16.

== Aftermath ==
While the raid was taking place, Brant and his volunteers had been raiding frontier settlements in the upper Delaware River valley. Brant's men were especially upset at the destruction of the two towns, as were the Seneca warriors who joined Brant at the ruins of Unadilla a few days later. This anger contributed to reprisals when a joint British and Haudenosaunee force attacked Cherry Valley, leading to the massacre of 30 noncombatants by the Seneca.

The severity of the frontier war in 1778 led to calls by the Continental Congress for a response. In 1779 General Washington organized a major Continental Army expedition into the Haudenosaunee lands. Led by Major General John Sullivan and Brigadier General James Clinton, the Sullivan Expedition destroyed villages, crops, and winter stores, driving most of the British-supporting Haudenosaunee out of their lands. Despite the apparent success of the expedition, the frontier war continued with renewed vigor in the following years.
