= Jacob Klock (colonel) =

Colonel Jacob Klock (1701–1798) was the colonel of the 2nd regiment of the Tryon County militia during the American Revolutionary War.

George Klock was a farmer and trader who kept a disreputable store and tavern next to the Mohawk village of Canajoharie. The Mohawk Canajoharie chief complained to William Johnson "I am under the necessity of complaining again, against that old rogue, the old disturber of our village, George Klock". Joseph Brant and others broke into his house and forced him to relinquish his claim to the Mohawk village of Canajoharie. Jacob Klock married Anna Nelles in Albany County on April 7, 1763.

He was at the Battle of Oriskany and other battles. In 1777, he was chairman of the Tryon County Committee of Safety.

He died in Montgomery County, New York in 1798.
