= Onaquaga =

Former Haudenosaunee settlement

- Former Haudenosaunee Village
- Interactive map of Onaquaga
- Country: United States
- State: New York
- County: Broome

Onaquaga (also spelled many other ways) was a large Haudenosaunee village, located on both sides of the Susquehanna River near present-day Windsor, New York. During the American Revolutionary War, the Continental Army destroyed it and nearby Unadilla in October 1778 in retaliation for British and Haudenosaunee attacks on frontier communities. The hamlet of Ouaquaga is now located along the Susquehanna close to the southern border of Windsor.

== Population ==
Onaquaga was originally home to members of the Oneida tribe, one of the Five Nations of the Haudenosaunee Confederacy. The Iroquoian-speaking Tuscarora people joined in outlying settlements when they migrated north from South Carolina and became the Sixth Nation of the confederacy in 1722. In 1753, Nanticoke refugees from Virginia also moved into the village. That same year, Reverend Gideon Hawley established an Indian mission in the village. The establishment of the mission led to an increase in population of Christianized Indians living in and about the village, both those from the area and those who migrated from elsewhere.

Following the 1768 Treaty of Fort Stanwix, Mohawks were forced north and west and a number settled in Onaquaga, just west of the treaty line. They were prosperous, had some cattle and poultry, gardens, and fruit trees. Many of the inhabitants were Christians. By the time of the American Revolution, representatives from all of the Six Nations, a group of Algonquian-speaking Lenape people, and also a number of Loyalists lived in Onaquaga, a total population of about 400.

In October 1778 during the Revolutionary War, Joseph Brant used Onaquaga as a base for raids on New York and Pennsylvania frontier communities. In retaliation the Americans organized a raid commanded by Lieutenant Colonel William Butler. Faced with superior forces the inhabitants abandoned the town, which was then burned by the Americans. The following year, Captain Jacob (Scott) of the Saponi (Catawba), who had resided at Onaguaga, helped Brant try to restrain the Seneca during the Cherry Valley massacre.

== Alternate spellings ==
Historian Francis Whiting Halsey, who spelled the name of the village Oghwaga, included this footnote in his 1901 work The Old New York Frontier:

Spelled in almost every conceivable manner. Among the forms are Oneaquaga, Oughquagy, Onoaughquagey, Ononghquage, Auquauga, Anaquaga, Oughquogey, Anaquegha, Onaquaga, Aughquagee, Ochquaga, Aughquagey, Oquaca, Oguaga, Anaquaqua, Oquage, and Okwaha. The form Okwaho is used in the Marcoux Dictionary, which gives the meaning wolf. This was a term applied to one of the Mohawk tribes. Gideon Hawley wrote Onohoghquage. Dr. O’Callaghan employed the form Oghquaga. For the present village in the town of Colesville, the spelling is Ouaquaga. A little further east in the Southern Tier of New York State, in Delaware County, the form Oquaga is used for a small lake, a waterway, the eponymous Oquaga Creek State Park, and a hotel in the town of Deposit. The northerly branch of the Delaware has been called the Coquago branch. Wilkinson wrote Oquago, and Washington Anaquaga. Stone adopted the form Oghkwaga. Sir William Johnson wrote Oghquago – though not always. Joseph Brant, after the Battle of Minisink, used the form Oghwage. Brant was a Mohawk Indian who knew how to spell. The word is pronounced in three syllables. In order to secure such pronunciation the author has taken the liberty of converting Brant’s final "e" into an "a," making it Oghwaga. A. Cusick told Dr. Beauchamp he thought the word meant place of hulled-corn soup.

== See also ==
- Ouaquaga Lenticular Truss Bridge
