= John Ross (British Army officer, born 1744) =

British Army officer

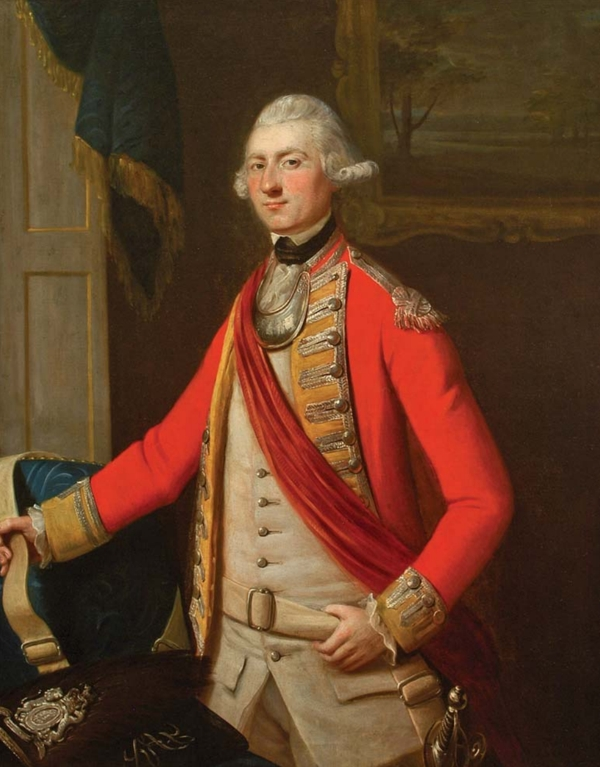
- Portrait attributed to David Martin, c. 1769
- Born: c. 1744; Scotland
- Military career
- Allegiance: Great Britain
- Branch: British Army
- Service years: 1762–1789
- Rank: Major
- Commands: Grenadier Company, 34th Regiment of Foot; 2nd Battalion, King's Royal Regiment of New York
- Conflicts: Seven Years' War; Siege of Havana; American War of Independence; Battle of Hubbardton; Battle of Johnstown

Major John Ross (c. 1744–?) was a British Army officer who served in the Seven Years' War and American War of Independence. He is best known for commanding a mixed force of Loyalists, British regulars, and Native Americans in a large-scale raid on New York's Mohawk Valley in October 1781 that culminated in the Battle of Johnstown, one of the last battles in the northern theater of the American War of Independence. After the war, Ross was instrumental in settling Loyalist refugees in what is now the Kingston area of eastern Ontario.

== Early career ==
Ross was born in Scotland in 1744. He joined the 34th Regiment of Foot as a Lieutenant in July 1762, and was present at the capture of Havana that year. The regiment garrisoned West Florida from 1764 to 1768. In 1764, following the conclusion of the Seven Years' War, Ross was sent to the Illinois Country to take possession of Fort de Chartres from the French. During this expedition, he mapped the course of the Mississippi River from New Orleans to de Chartres. The 34th Foot returned to the British Isles in 1769 and was posted to Ireland as part of the Irish Establishment. Ross was promoted to captain in March, 1772. In 1776, the regiment was sent to Quebec.

== American War of Independence ==
In 1777, two companies of the 34th Foot, including Ross's grenadier company, were assigned to the Saratoga campaign, an attempt by British forces under Lieutenant General John Burgoyne to gain control of the Hudson River valley. Ross was wounded at the Battle of Hubbardton on 7 July 1777 and invalided back to Quebec. As a result, he escaped becoming a prisoner of war when Burgoyne surrendered following the Battles of Saratoga.

In July 1780, Ross, a “veteran officer of high reputation,” was brevetted major by the Governor of Quebec, Lieutenant General Frederick Haldimand, and tasked with organizing the 2nd Battalion of the King's Royal Regiment of New York. The King's Royal Regiment of New York was a provincial regiment composed of Loyalist volunteers. Initially, the 2nd Battalion was sent to Coteau-du-Lac west of Montreal, but in November 1780, were assigned to garrison Fort Haldimand, located on Carleton Island at the head of the St. Lawrence River. Ross strengthened Carleton Island's defences until "the fort was too strong to be stormed" and dispatched reconnaissance patrols to the Mohawk Valley.

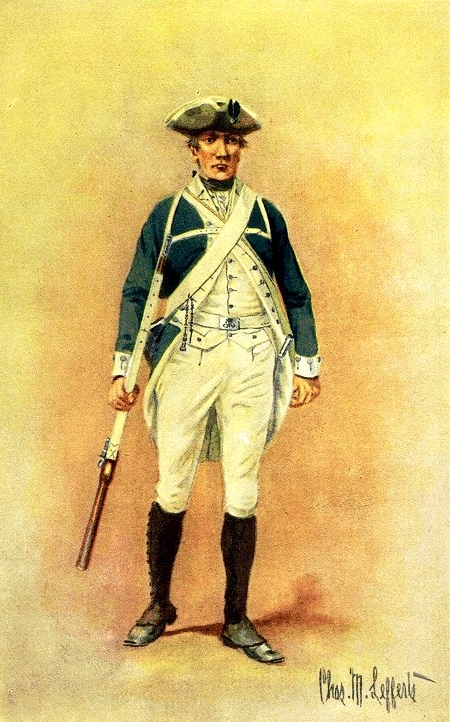
A Private in the King's Royal Regiment of New York by Charles M. Lefferts

In October 1781, Ross led a large-scale raid that destroyed Warrensborough on the Mohawk River east of Fort Hunter. Ross arrived at Oswego on Lake Ontario on 3 October with 155 members of the 2nd Battalion, Leake's Independent Company, a company of the 34th Foot, a detachment of the Royal Highland Emigrants, and a small number of Hanau Jägers. A week later, Captain Walter Butler arrived from Fort Niagara with 150 Butler's Rangers and a detachment of the 8th Regiment of Foot. Also with the expedition were 100 Native Americans under the direction of Captain Gilbert Tice of the British Indian Department and Mohawk war chief David Hill.

Ross's expedition ascended the Oswego and Oneida rivers to Oneida Lake. They then proceeded overland, paralleling the south side of the Mohawk River until they reached Warrensborough on 25 October. Ross later reported that "before 12 O’clock the whole Settlement for seven miles was in flames, near 100 farms, three Mills and a large Granary for Public Service were reduced to Ashes, the Cattle and Stock of all kinds were likewise destroyed. The Inhabitants fled precipitately in the Night.”

At Warrensborough, Ross learned that "the Rebels were on their march from every Quarter." He decided that the expedition would ford the Mohawk River then head directly through the wilderness to Carleton Island rather than return to Oswego.

Late in the afternoon of 25 October, Ross was overtaken near Johnstown by American militia under the command of Colonel Marinus Willett. The Battle of Johnstown saw Willett's initial attack repulsed. An surprise attack by Major Aaron Rowley on the British right flank followed and allowed Willett to again advance on Ross's position. Fighting continued sporadically, but as darkness fell, Ross ordered his men to withdraw.

Ross subsequently allowed a number of prisoners to escape. The prisoners had been falsely told that the British intended to head west. Based on this false intelligence, Willett proceeded to Stone Arabia but after several hours waiting for Ross to appear realized he had been deceived. On 28 October, his scouts discovered Ross's trail. Willett set out in pursuit with 400 troops and 60 Oneida warriors. On 30 October, his vanguard encountered Ross's rearguard at West Canada Creek. Butler was killed during the ensuing skirmish, most likely by an Oneida Indian.

Willett decided to discontinue the pursuit. Ross continued north and returned to Carleton Island on 6 November.

In the spring of 1782, Ross reestablished the British outpost at Oswego and rebuilt Fort Ontario which had been abandoned years earlier. Ross was commended by Haldimand for the "rapid establishment of the post."

== Cataraqui settlement ==
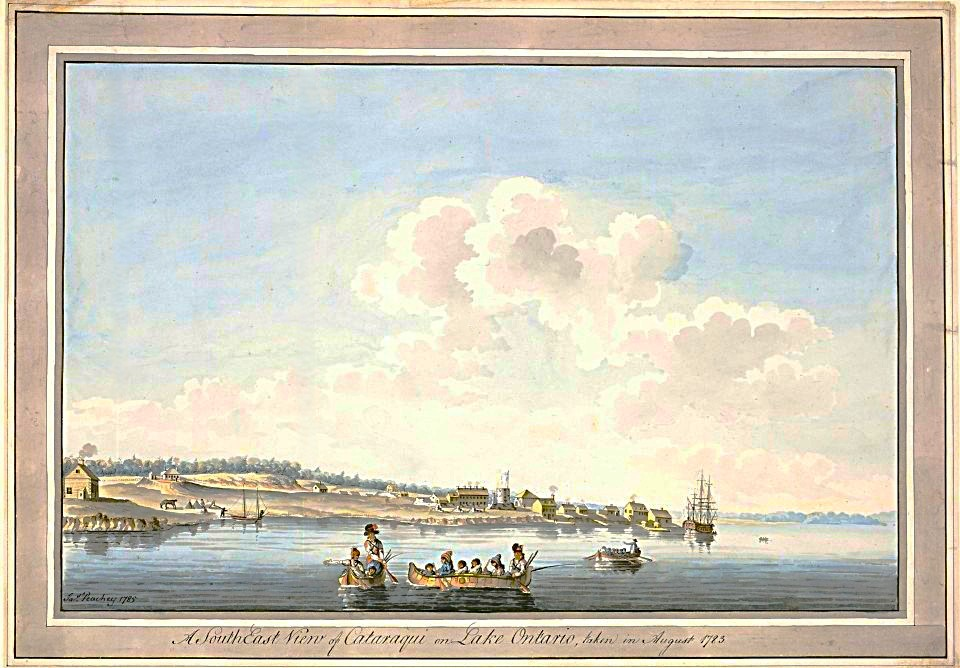
Southeast View of Cataraqui, 1785 by James Peachey

In June 1783, Ross was ordered to move most of the Oswego garrison to Cataraqui (now Kingston) at the eastern end of Lake Ontario in preparation for the resettlement of Loyalist refugees. Ross brought with him 25 officers and 422 men, many of whom belonged to the 2nd Battalion. He constructed barracks on the side of the old French fort (Fort Frontenac), erected a gristmill and saw mill, established a naval yard, and assisted with the allocation of land and supplies. Ross recommended that the land on which the Loyalists were to be settled should be formally acquired from the Mississaugas. In October 1783, Captain William Crawford of the 2nd Battalion negotiated the Crawford Purchase of Mississauga territory along the north shore of Lake Ontario and the St. Lawrence River from the Trent River to Jones Creek (west of present-day Brockville).

Ross was appointed a Justice of the Peace in 1784 to enable him to deal with civilian matters. Because of Ross's significance in establishing the settlement, historian Robert Preston has suggested that Ross, rather than Michael Grass, leader of the first contingent of Loyalists, should be considered the founder of Kingston.

== Later years ==
It is believed that Ross married a sister of Captain John McDonell of Butler’s Rangers.

The 2nd Battalion of the King's Royal Regiment of New York was disbanded at Cataraqui on 24 Jun 1784. In 1785, Ross took extended leave in Great Britain to care for his aged father. He was confirmed as a major in the 34th Foot on 20 May 1785, and returned to Canada in 1786. In August 1786, Ross was placed under arrest due to vague accusations made by a subordinate, Lieutenant William Tinling of the 29th Foot. The charges were quickly dismissed. Ross returned to the British Isles with the 24th Foot in 1787. He sold his commission and retired from the army on 17 Feb 1789. Details of his later life, descendants, and death are not known.
