= 2nd Albany County Militia Regiment =

- Active: 1775–1783
- Allegiance: State of New York
- Type: militia
- Part of: New York Militia
- Engagements: Saratoga

Commanders
- Notable commanders: Abraham Wemple

The 2nd Albany County Militia Regiment was the local militia unit for Schenectady, New York, during the American Revolutionary War under the command of Colonel Abraham Wemple. The regiment saw action with the Continental Army in 1777 at the Battle of Saratoga in General John Glover's brigade. It was called out to fight against the loyalist and their Indian allies at the Battle of Klock's Field on October 19, 1780, and Battle of Johnstown on October 25, 1781. A member from the 2nd Albany may have been the person who killed the Loyalist officer Walter Butler of Butler's Rangers on October 30, 1781, during a skirmish.

== See also ==
- Albany County militia
