= Peter Hare (army officer) =

- Born: 11 May 1748; Mohawk River, Province of New York
- Died: 6 April 1834 (aged 85); Lincoln Co., Upper Canada
- Burial place: Snure Cemetery, Lincoln Co.
- Military career
- Allegiance: Great Britain (Loyalist)
- Service years: Bef. 1776 — June 1784
- Rank: Captain
- Units: 2nd Albany County Militia Regiment; Butler's Rangers
- Conflicts: American Revolutionary War: Wyoming Valley massacre; Cherry Valley massacre
- Other work: Farmer

Captain Peter Hare (11 May 1748 — 6 April 1834) was a company officer in Butler's Rangers, a militia unit during the American Revolutionary War, and British Loyalist. After the war ended Hare emigrated and settled with his family in Lincoln County, Ontario where he farmed until his death in 1834.

== Early life ==
Hare was born on 11 May 1748 in Mohawk River, Tryon County, New York, United States. He was the third son and youngest of four children born to John Hare. Hare was likely to have first enlisted for duty in the 2nd Albany County Militia Regiment. However, on the onset of the American Revolutionary War he resigned from the Rebel regiment and instead joined the Loyalist Butler's Rangers led by John Butler.

== Revolutionary War ==
Hare was a regimental company captain in Butler's Rangers, a British provincial regiment composed of Loyalists, during the American Revolutionary war. Hare participated in the Wyoming Valley massacre of July 1778 and the Cherry Valley massacre in November of the same year. Due to actions by their allies, Iroquois under the command of Joseph Brant, the unit as a whole was seen as savage.

When the war ended Hare moved to Lincoln County in Ontario where he, like several other veterans who had served with Butler's Rangers, was granted land to farm.

== Family and descendants ==
Hare married three times. He first married Elizabeth Petree, a French lady, in October 1777. Their wedding took place in the Mohawk Valley of Tryon County. When Elizabeth died in 1785 he remarried Catherine Greenwalt in 1787. Hare thirdly married Margaret (Bowman) Secord, widow of Solomon Secord, after his second wife Catherine died.

Throughout his three marriages Hare had a total of ten children:

- Family of Capt. Peter and Elizabeth (Petree) Hare:
  - Mary Hare (18 Jan 1779 — Mar 1849) married Robert Brown.
  - Catherine Hare (24 Feb 1781 — Abt. 1812) married Isaac Walker.
- Family of Capt. Peter and Catherine (Greenwalt) Hare:
  - Elizabeth Hare (1788 — 1817) married Thomas Bradt.
  - Annie Hare (1790 — ?) married John Bradt.
  - John Hare (9 Jan 1792 — 1817)
  - Peter Hare, Jr. (13 Feb 1794 — 1856) married firstly Magdalena Secord and secondly widow Jane McGaw.
  - William Hare (12 Apr 1796 — 1856)
  - Deborah Hare (12 Sep 1797 — 1884)
  - James H. Hare (26 Jun 1801 — 1880) married Rachel Patterson.
- Family of Capt. Peter and Margaret (Bowman) Hare:
  - Margaret Hare (20 Jun 1812 — 1870) married Robert Henry.
