= Crawford Purchase =

1783 agreement that surrendered lands in what is now Canada to the British Crown

The Crawford Purchase was an agreement that surrendered lands that extended west along the north shore of the St. Lawrence River and Lake Ontario from the Mississaugas to the British crown to enable Loyalist settlement in what is now a part of eastern Ontario, Canada. The agreement was made in 1783 in exchange for various items. It was the first of a sequence of agreements between the British and the Mississaugas ultimately covering most of southeastern Ontario.

== Background ==
Land in the eastern region of what is now Ontario was being settled by Loyalists and their Native allies in 1783. This area was historically territory of the Anishinaabe, more specifically the Algonquin and Mississauga nations. It had come under the control of the Iroquois during the Beaver Wars in the second half of the 17th century. The Mississaugas had recovered the territory by 1700. Since land to the west of the Province of Quebec had been reserved as "Indian reserve" land via the Royal Proclamation of 1763, the British required an arrangement to be worked out with the Mississaugas before the land became organized for settlement.

== Agreement ==
Frederick Haldimand, governor of the Province of Quebec instructed Sir John Johnson, Inspector General of Indian Affairs, to begin land purchase negotiations. Negotiations were led by Captain William Radford Crawford of the King's Royal Regiment of New York. The agreement was signed on 9 October 1783 on Carleton Island and gave the British title to "all the lands from the Toniata or Ongara River (now Jones Creek near Brockville) to a river in the Bay of Quinte within eight leagues to the bottom of the said Bay including all the islands extending from the lake as far back as a man can travail (sic) in a day". The actual extent comprised an area of land from near Gananoque to the Trent River and about 30 miles inland.

The Mississaugas received gifts which consisted of blankets, clothing, guns, ammunition, and "as much red cloth as would make a dozen coats and as many laced hats".

The Crawford Purchase was designated an Event of National Historic Significance on 17 May 1929.

== See also ==
- Toronto Purchase and Rideau Purchase, other agreements with the Mississaugas covering adjacent land to the west and north.
- John Ross (1744–1809)
