= Walter Butler (Loyalist) =

British Loyalist officer

- Born: 26 August 1753; Butlersbury, Province of New York
- Died: 30 October 1781 (aged 28)
- Military career
- Allegiance: Great Britain
- Service years: 1775-1781
- Rank: Captain
- Units: 8th Regiment of Foot; Butler's Rangers
- Conflicts: American Revolutionary War: Battle of Longue-Pointe; Battle of the Cedars; Siege of Fort Stanwix; Cherry Valley massacre; Battle of Newtown; Battle of Klock's Field; Battle of Johnstown †

Walter Butler (26 August 1753 – 30 October 1781) was an American-born Loyalist military officer during the American Revolutionary War. He left his home in Tryon County, New York for Montreal in 1775 and obtained a commission as an ensign in the British Army. Butler was present at the Battle of the Cedars in May 1776 and the Siege of Fort Stanwix in August 1777. He was captured by the Americans shortly afterwards and sentenced to be hanged as a spy. His sentence was commuted and he was imprisoned in Albany. Butler escaped from custody in April 1778, and was commissioned a captain in Butler's Rangers. In November 1778, Butler led British, Loyalist and Seneca forces at the Cherry Valley massacre. Butler was unable to restrain the Seneca who killed 32 non-combatants. He was present at the Battle of Newtown in August 1779. Butler was killed in October 1781 at West Canada Creek fighting a rear-guard action following the Battle of Johnstown.

== Early life ==
Butler was born on 26 August 1753 at Butlersbury, near Johnstown in the Province of New York. He was the eldest son of Catalyntje Bradt and John Butler, a British Indian Department officer who worked for Sir William Johnson. He studied law at Albany and was admitted to the bar prior to the American Revolutionary War. Due to persecution by Patriots, Walter and his father left Butlersbury in August 1775, and accompanied Guy Johnson, Daniel Claus and other Loyalists to Montreal. Walter's mother and siblings were subsequently interned by the Patriots and held until April 1780 when they were exchanged.

== Military career ==
On 25 September 1775, Butler helped capture Ethan Allen at the Battle of Longue-Pointe. In November, he accompanied Johnson and Mohawk leader Joseph Brant to England where he secured a commission as an ensign in the 8th Regiment of Foot. Butler returned to Quebec in the spring of 1776 and joined a detachment of the 8th Foot at Osawegatchie on the St. Lawrence River west of Montreal. He was with the detachment at the Battle of the Cedars in May 1776.

The 8th Foot were part of the expedition commanded by Brigadier General Barry St. Leger that besieged Fort Stanwix from 2 Aug to 22 Aug 1777. On 6 Aug 1777, an American column of Tryon County militia and Oneida marching to relieve the siege of was ambushed by roughly 400 of Britain's Indigenous allies supported by Indian Department rangers and a company of the King's Royal Regiment of New York. The Battle of Oriskany cost the Americans 465 casualties including their commanding officer, Brigadier General Nicholas Herkimer, who died of his wounds. John Butler, then a Deputy Superintendent in the Indian Department, helped plan the ambush and led the Indian Department rangers during the battle. It is unlikely that Walter Butler, still an ensign in the 8th Foot, participated in the attack.

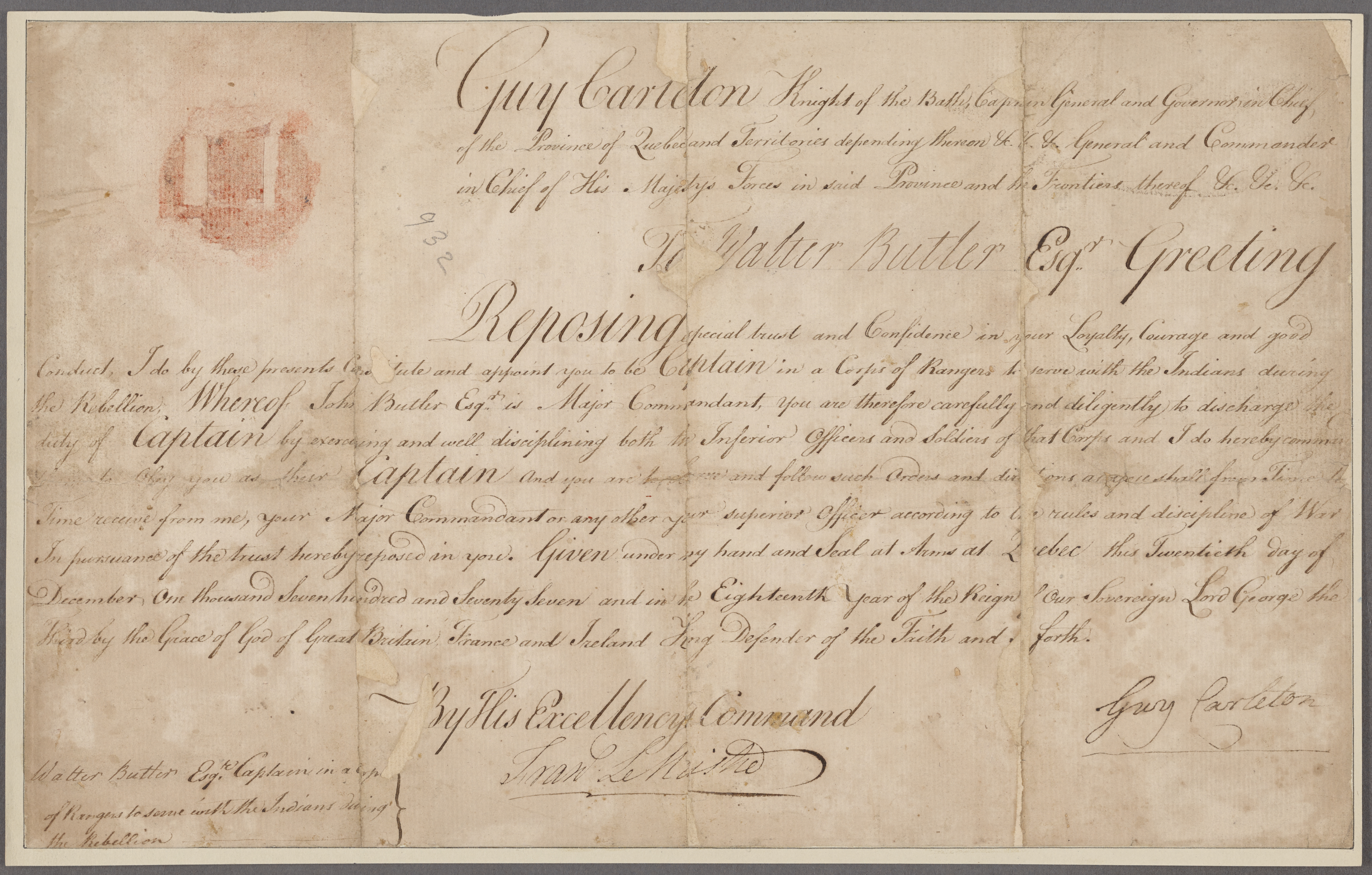
Walter Butler's commission as a captain in Butler's Rangers

Johnson, Claus, and John Butler convinced St. Leger that a delegation should be sent under a flag of truce to convince the inhabitants of the Mohawk valley to abandon their support for the rebellion. Walter Butler was chosen to lead the 18-man delegation. On 15 August, the delegation was taken prisoner by Continental Army soldiers at Shoemaker's Tavern in German Flatts. Butler was court-martialed and sentenced to be hanged as a spy. The sentence was approved by Brigadier General Benedict Arnold but was later commuted by Major General Philip Schuyler who had asked for the prisoners to be sent to Albany.

Butler protested the deplorable conditions of the Albany jail to Schuyler and to his successor, Major General Horatio Gates. In January 1778, he was moved to the home of Richard Cartwright. In April 1778, he escaped with the aid of his host and headed west. Butler was reunited with his father at the Seneca town of Canandaigua. During Walter's imprisonment, his father was given permission a raise a corps of rangers. Walter learned that he had been appointed a captain in the new regiment. Butler proceeded to Fort Niagara, then travelled to Quebec to recover his health and deliver his father's plan for an upcoming campaign to the Governor of Quebec, Lieutenant General Sir Guy Carleton. Walter Butler was at Quebec when Butler's Rangers and their Indigenous allies routed the Americans at the Battle of Wyoming.

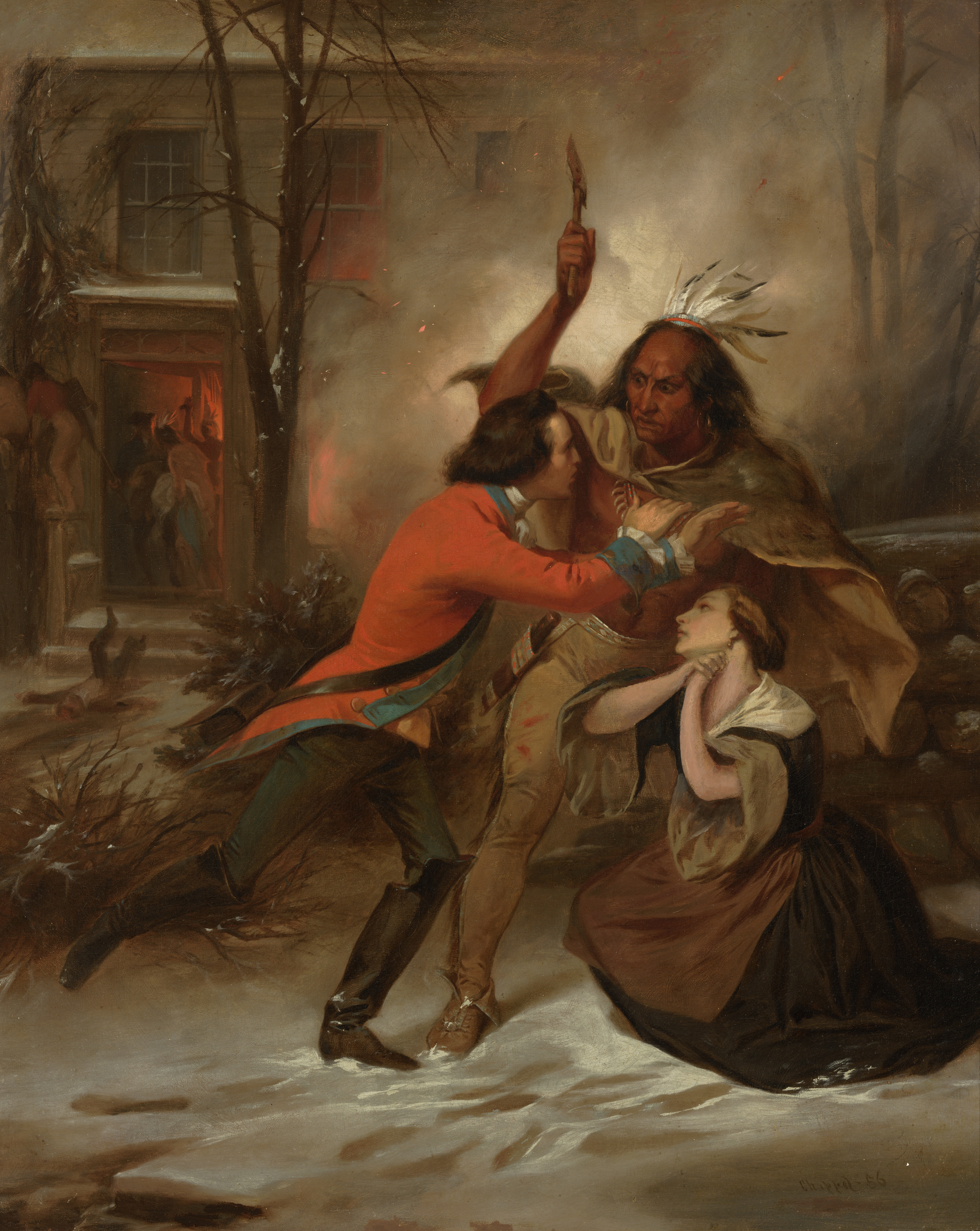
Fate of Jane Wells (Incident in Cherry Valley) by Alonzo Chappel, 1856

On 11 November 1778, in his only independent command, Butler led two companies of Butler's Rangers and a detachment of the 8th Foot in an attack on Cherry Valley, a frontier settlement located on a headwater tributary of the Susquehanna River. With Butler were Brant's Volunteers led by Joseph Brant and roughly 320 Seneca and Cayuga led by Cornplanter and Little Beard. Most of the Volunteers abandoned the expedition before the attack because Butler had demanded that Brant's Loyalist followers enlist in Butler's Rangers, and had threatened to withhold rations if they refused. Brant also thought about leaving but was convinced to stay by his Indigenous followers.

Butler was unable to control his Indigenous allies during the attack. While the Rangers and regulars blockaded the settlement's fort, the Seneca rampaged through the village. Despite the best efforts of Brant to restrain them, they killed and scalped 32 non-combatants, mostly women and children, and 16 soldiers. 70 captives were taken but over half were freed two days later due to the efforts of Butler and Brant.

In his report to his father, Butler deeply regretted the massacre:

I have much to lament that notwithstanding my utmost precaution and endeavours to save the women and children, I could not prevent some of them falling unhappy victims to the fury of the savages. They have carried off many of the inhabitants prisoners and killed more.

Many Americans blamed Butler for the massacre, falsely believing that he had ordered the Seneca to kill non-combatants. While lacking in veracity, a letter written by the Reverend John Henry Livingston shortly after the massacre is illustrative of American sentiment at the time:

The devastation at Cherry Valley are marked with Such scenes of Cruelty as surmount perlays any attempt of the kind during the War ... Col Alden is killed, the Leut Col. a prisoner. between 30 & 40 Women & Children butchered in the most unheard of manner. there is an Anecdote of the famous Brant mentioned upon this occasion which deserves to be made public & if true reflects immortal infamy upon the Tory rabble who have fled among the Savages & upon every occasion prove themselves worse than the heathen. it is Said when this party Came out, their Orders were read by young Butler upon which Brant turned himself round & wept and then recovering himself told Butler; that he was going to make war against America but not to murder and Butcher; that he was an Enemy from principle but wod never have a hand in Massacring the Defenceless Inhabitants upon which the bloody department was committed to a Seneca Indian whilst the noble Brant with another party attacked the fort. had the British leaders or the British King been actuated by Sentiments of this sort the American War wod not have been Stained with such unparalleled cruelty, nor the name of Briton so justly execrated throughout these States.

The Seneca admitted to Butler afterwards that they were angered by accusations of atrocities at the Battle of Wyoming. They were also angry that paroled militia had participated in a September 1778 retaliatory raid led by Colonel Thomas Hartley, and that in October 1778, Continental Army units under Lieutenant Colonel William Butler had destroyed the substantial Indigenous villages at Unadilla and Onaquaga on the Susquehanna River.

As the Ranger's senior captain, Butler was often saddled with administrative tasks. He served as the Ranger's paymaster and made several trips to Montreal and Quebec with the corps's muster rolls and pay bills. His journal of an eight-day voyage to Montreal by bateau in March 1779 provides a detailed description of his route along the shore of Lake Ontario from Fort Niagara to Cataraqui.

In response to the Cherry Valley massacre and to other attacks on frontier settlements, George Washington ordered a campaign against the Seneca and Cayuga. His stated goal was "the total destruction and devastation of their settlements." Led by Major General John Sullivan, the expedition razed 40 villages and destroyed food stores and crops in the summer of 1779, forcing thousands of refugees to flee to Fort Niagara. Butler was present at the Battle of Newtown when Butler's Rangers, Brant's Volunteers and their Indigenous allies were defeated during an attempt to hold back the invading force.

In October 1780, houses, barns, mills, and stores of grain and hay were burned as Loyalist forces led by Sir John Johnson marched down the Schoharie Valley to the Mohawk River, then headed west to destroy Stone Arabia. American militia under the command of Brigadier General Robert Van Rensselaer engaged Johnson's men west of Stone Arabia at the inconclusive Battle of Klock's Field on 19 October 1780. Four companies of Butler's Rangers were attached to Johnson's expedition but it is unlikely that Walter Butler was present as he had been reported as "extremely sickly" at the end of September and had been granted permission to go to Montreal.

A year later, Major John Ross, commanding the 2nd Battalion of the King's Royal Regiment of New York, led a raid on the Mohawk Valley that destroyed Warrensborough to the east of Fort Hunter before heading to Johnstown. With Ross were three companies of Butler's Rangers led by Walter Butler. On 25 October 1781, Ross engaged several hundred Patriot militia commanded by Colonel Marinus Willett at the Battle of Johnstown. Five days later, as Ross withdrew towards Carleton Island, a rear-guard action at West Canada Creek resulted in Butler's death. Witnesses to the skirmish later provided several contradictory accounts of including claims that Butler shouted, "Shoot and be damned," and that Louis Cook (Akiatonharónkwen), who led a contingent of Oneida at the Battle of Johnstown, fired the fatal shot. Most accounts agree that Butler was killed by a shot to the head from an Oneida warrior, that he was scalped and stripped of his uniform, and that his corpse was left at the scene.

It has been frequently stated that in the Mohawk Valley the news of Butler's death was celebrated more than the American victory at the Battle of Yorktown. The British reaction was more restrained. Upon receiving the news of Butler's death, the Governor of Quebec, Lieutenant General Frederick Haldimand wrote "He was a very active, promising Officer and one of those whose loss at all times, but particularly in the present, is much to be lamented."

== Legacy ==
In War Out of Niagara, Howard Swiggett noted that early American historical writers invariably portrayed Butler as cruel and vindictive. Swiggett wrote that "Public Opinion fixed upon young Butler as the Devil, and made him part of every midnight murder of the long years." John Buchan wrote in his preface to Swiggett's books that "Young Walter Butler of the Rangers has been one of the most hotly vilified characters of popular Revolutionary history."

Benson John Lossing, author of the widely acclaimed Pictorial Field-Book of the Revolution, named Butler as the "head and font of all the cruelty at Cherry Valley." He echoed claims that Butler sought revenge for his earlier imprisonment, and for his family's internment. Lossing further asserted that British authorities "viewed him with horror and disgust." He also repeated an earlier allegation made by Yale University president Timothy Dwight that Butler ordered the murder of bedridden woman and infant during the massacre.

Butler's reputation for bloodthirstiness persisted well into the 20th century. In his 1936 short story, The Devil and Daniel Webster, Stephen Vincent Benét included Butler as one of the "jury of the damned." Benet described Butler as "the loyalist, who spread fire and horror through the Mohawk Valley in the times of the Revolution." Butler appears as a villain in several historical novels written by prolific author Robert W. Chambers. In Hidden Children, published in 1914, Chambers wrote "through the wintry dawn at Cherry Valley, young Walter Butler damned his soul for all eternity while men, women, and children, old and young, died horribly amid the dripping knives and bayonets of his painted fiends, or fell under the butchering hatchets of his Senecas." A far more accurate and sympathetic treatment appears in John Brick's 1953 The King's Rangers. In the novel, the fictional Dan Millard joins Butler's Rangers and serves under Butler at the Cherry Valley massacre, an event which "shocked Dan and Walter Butler as profoundly as [it] has shocked historians since."

Modern historians have tended to view Butler through a more nuanced lens, noting that his reputation is largely the result of propaganda and myth-making. There is no documentary evidence that suggests that Butler led multiple small-scale raids, and with the notable exception of Cherry Valley, none of the engagements where he was present are associated with atrocities. Unlike his father, Butler struggled to establish working relationships with Indigenous leaders, and his letters frequently displayed his arrogance. In response to Butler's requests for promotion to major, Haldimand wrote "Captain Butler's zeal and activity I am very sensible of and shall not be unmindful of them. I am sorry to observe that he rates his services very high and is a little unreasonable in his requests." Barbara Graymont, author of The Iroquois in the American Revolution, observed that "What young Butler lacked in experience, he made up for in hauteur.
