= King's Royal Regiment of New York =

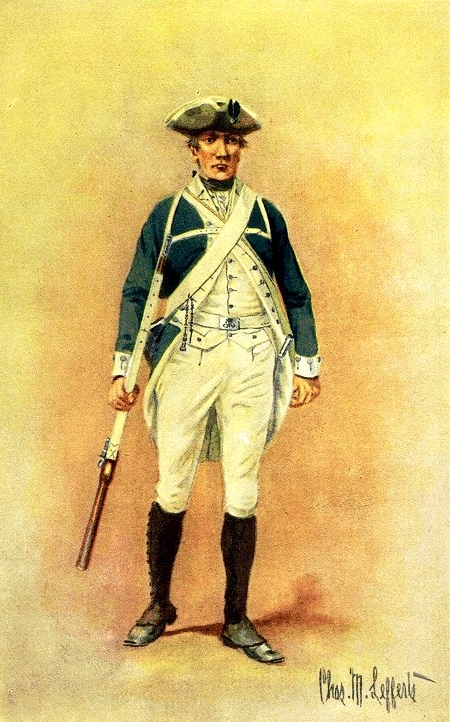
- Private of the King's Royal Regiment of New York, 1776 by Charles M. Lefferts
- Active: 1776–1784
- Country: Great Britain
- Type: Light infantry
- Size: 955 (Two battalions)
- Nicknames: Royal Yorkers, King's Royal Yorkers, Johnson's Greens
- Engagements: American Revolutionary War: Saratoga Campaign (1777); Siege of Fort Stanwix (1777)); Battle of Oriskany (1777); Carleton's Raid (1778); Battle of Klock's Field (1780); Battle of Johnstown (1781)

Commanders
- Notable commanders: Sir John Johnson

The King's Royal Regiment of New York, also known as the Royal Yorkers, King's Royal Yorkers or Johnson's Greens, was one of the first Loyalist regiments, raised on 19 June 1776, in the British colony of Quebec, colloquially known as Canada, during the American Revolutionary War.

The regiment was formed by Loyalist leader, Sir John Johnson, from American refugees fleeing Patriot persecution. The regiment served with distinction throughout the war, launching raids and relief missions into the Province of New York. In the summer of 1777, the regiment was present at the siege of Fort Stanwix during the expedition of Brigadier General Barry St. Leger, and saw action at the Battle of Oriskany. Along with their Haudenosaunee allies and other provincial regiments such as Butler's Rangers, the regiment took part in a series of raids, mostly in the Mohawk Valley. The regiment played a major role in the 1780 large-scale raid on the Schoharie and Mohawk valleys that culminated in the Battle of Klock's Field.

The regiment eventually comprised two battalions. The first battalion was disbanded in 1783 and the second in 1784. Members of the regiment were granted land and settled along the St. Lawrence River and the north shore of Lake Ontario.

== Raising the regiment (1776) ==
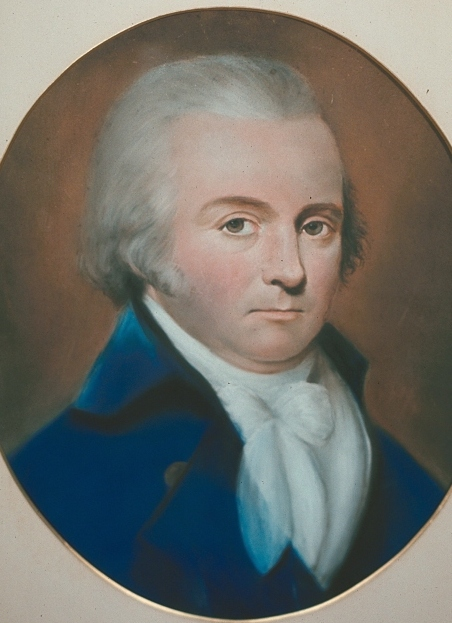
Sir John Johnson 1792

On 19 May 1776, Sir John Johnson, fearing arrest, fled his home at Johnson Hall in the Mohawk Valley. He travelled with 170 Loyalist supporters through the Adirondack Mountains to Akwesasne on the St. Lawrence River and then to Montreal. They arrived on 15 June, just days after the Governor of Quebec, Sir Guy Carleton, had recaptured the city from the Americans following the 1775 Invasion of Quebec. Johnson soon left Montreal to join the pursuit of the retreating Continental Army southwards towards Lake Champlain. He met Carleton at Fort Chambly, where the Governor authorized Johnson to raise the King's Royal Regiment of New York.

At first, the regiment was composed mostly of Johnson's tenants from his estates in the Mohawk Valley, but the steady stream of Loyalist refugees fleeing to Canada provided a ready source of recruits for the Royal Yorkers. In June 1778, the regiment mustered 370 officers and men. By 1780 the regiment was approaching its authorized strength of 10 companies, and permission was granted to raise a second battalion. A year later, the regiment had a total strength of 955 officers and men.

== St. Leger's expedition (1777) ==
Part of the British strategy to defeat the Continental Army under General Washington involved invading New York from Canada along the traditional Lake Champlain and Lake George water route. In June 1777, the main British army, under the command of Sir John Burgoyne, advanced southwards along this route towards Albany. A second force, under the command of Brigadier General Barry St. Leger, advanced from Carleton Island on the Saint Lawrence River to Oswego. The expedition ascended the Oswego and Oneida rivers to Oneida Lake then crossed to Fort Stanwix on the Mohawk River, intending to capture the fort before advancing downriver. St. Leger's army consisted of 240 British regulars, 90 jäger from Hesse-Hanau, Brant's Volunteers, and 250 men of the Royal Yorkers under Johnson's command. They were joined by 100 British Indian Department rangers from Fort Niagara led by deputy superintendent John Butler, and a large Indigenous contingent composed mainly of Seneca and Mississauga warriors.

In August 1777, St. Leger's army besieged Fort Stanwix (located in modern-day Rome, New York), which was defended by a sizable contingent of Continental Army troops. During the siege, a relief column of 750 New York militia under the command of Brigadier General Nicholas Herkimer approached Fort Stanwix. This relief force was ambushed by St. Leger's Indigenous allies, Brant's Volunteers, Indian Department rangers and the Royal Yorkers at the Battle of Oriskany. During the battle, the Americans suffered heavy losses, with over 400 casualties including Herkimer himself, who eventually died of his wounds. After several hours of fierce fighting, the Loyalist and Indigenous forces broke off the attack, allowing the surviving American militia to withdraw.

During the Oriskany engagement, the garrison of Fort Stanwix attacked the encampment of the British forces. Johnson's personal baggage and papers were captured, and large quantities of material were seized. Having suffered heavy casualties during the battle, St. Leger's Indigenous allies were demoralized by the loss of their camp and began leaving. On 22 August, St. Leger abandoned the siege when reports of another relief force under the command of Brigadier General Benedict Arnold were received.

St. Leger returned to Montreal, then immediately headed south with the Royal Yorkers to join Burgoyne. They were at Fort Ticonderoga when they learned that Burgoyne had been defeated at the Second Battle of Saratoga and had surrendered his army. Several weeks later the fort was abandoned and the Royal Yorkers went into winter quarters in villages near Montreal.

== Burning of the valleys (1778–1781) ==
For most of the war, the Royal Yorkers formed part of garrisons along the St. Lawrence River including those at Montreal, Lachine, Coteau-du-Lac, Sorel, Chambly, Fort Saint-Jean, and Carleton Island. Each year, however, detachments of the regiment took part in raids into New York for the purpose of rescuing beleaguered Loyalists and disrupting the Continental food supply.

In the fall of 1778, a detachment of the Royal Yorkers participated in a large-scale raid led by Major Christopher Carleton of the 29th Regiment of Foot against settlements near the south end of Lake Champlain.

In 1780, Johnson led four companies of the Royal Yorkers along with a detachment of British regulars and about 100 Mohawk warriors in a raid on the Mohawk Valley settlement of Caughnawaga. After burning every building in Caughnawaga except the church, the expedition headed for Johnson Hall. There Johnson recovered his family's collection of silver dishes that had been buried in the cellar before he fled in May 1776. A total of 143 Loyalists returned with Johnson to Quebec along with some of their families, 30 slaves and 13 prisoners. Johnson reported 120 houses, barns, and mills burnt, a large number of cattle slaughtered and about 70 horses taken.

During a subsequent raid in October 1780, Johnson's column of Royal Yorkers, Butler's Rangers, British regulars, Brant's Volunteers, and Seneca warriors marched down the Schoharie Valley to the Mohawk, then headed west to destroy Stone Arabia. Along the way, they burned houses, barns, mills, and massive stores of grain and hay. A force of Albany and Tryon County militia under the command of Brigadier General Robert Van Rensselaer engaged Johnson's men west of Stone Arabia at the inconclusive Battle of Klock's Field on 19 October.

Major John Ross, commanding the 2nd Battalion of the Royal Yorkers, led an October 1781 raid on the Mohawk Valley that destroyed Warrensborough to the east of Fort Hunter before heading to Johnstown. On 25 October, Ross engaged several hundred Patriot militia commanded by Colonel Marinus Willett at the Battle of Johnstown. Willett's initial attack was repulsed but a surprise attack on the British right flank allowed Willett to again advance on Ross's position. Fighting continued sporadically, and as darkness fell, Ross ordered his men to withdraw. Five days later, as Ross retreated towards Carleton Island, a rear-guard action at West Canada Creek resulted in the death of Captain Walter Butler of Butler's Rangers.

Following the British defeat at Yorktown in late 1781, and subsequent peace overtures initiated by the British government, the Royal Yorkers ceased offensive operations. They were employed in garrison duty for the rest of the war with the 2nd Battalion posted to Oswego, where they rebuilt Fort Ontario, and later at Cataraqui (now Kingston).

== Postwar ==
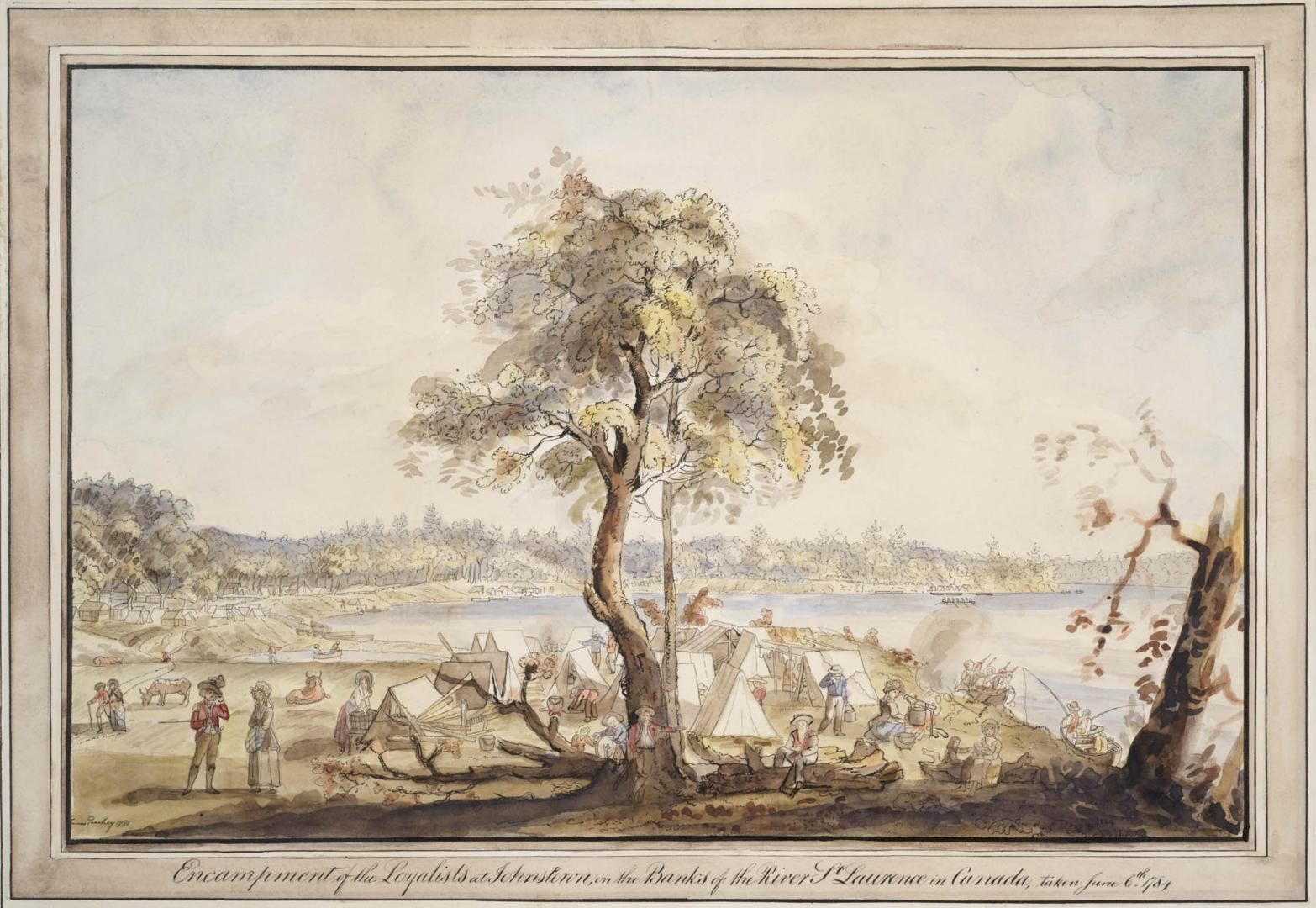
Encampment of the Loyalists at Johnstown, 1784 by James Peachey

The Treaty of Paris of 1783 ended the war but left little opportunity for Loyalists to return to their former homes. Few of the former rebels were prepared to forget, no less forgive, the punishing raids by Loyalist regiments from Canada. Many Patriots had acquired land, homes and farms seized from Loyalists under wartime confiscation acts. While the Treaty specified that those who fled were to be compensated for their losses by state governments, most states ignored this provision. Consequently, the British government offered land grants in Canada to Loyalist refugees.

In December 1783, the 1st Battalion of the Royal Yorkers was disbanded and settled along the St. Lawrence River in modern Stormont and Dundas counties. The following year, the 2nd Battalion was disbanded and settled along the north shore of Lake Ontario in modern Frontenac and Lennox and Addington counties.

Sir John Johnson settled in Montreal but owned several farms near Williamstown, Ontario and the seigneuries of Monnoir and Argenteuil in Quebec. He died in 1830 and was buried in a family vault at Mont Saint-Gregoire, Quebec.

Other officers of the regiment have known graves. Jeremiah French, a lieutenant in the second battalion, was buried at the Maple Grove Cemetery, two miles west of Cornwall, Ontario. The original cemetery was moved in the 1950s when the St. Lawrence Seaway was built. In 2004, a new gravestone was dedicated for French in the presence of several of his descendants and members of the recreated King's Royal Yorkers.

== Uniform ==
The men of the regiment were initially issued with dark green wool coats faced with red, rather than the red coats of the regular British Army. They wore buff-coloured waistcoats and breeches or trousers, and black tricorn hats. Beginning in 1779, the regiment was issued red coats faced with blue. The regiment likely carried the Short Land Pattern musket that had been developed for light infantry units. The coat or "service dress coatee" of Lieutenant French is in the collection of the Canadian War Museum.

== Legacy ==
A historical plaque commemorating the King's Royal Regiment of New York was unveiled in Kingston, Ontario in 1987.

In 1975, a living history regiment recreating the King's Royal Regiment of New York was raised in Ontario. The recreated King's Royal Yorkers are the largest and most active living history unit in Canada.

The King's Royal Regiment of New York appears in the video game Empire: Total War — Elite Units of America, released in December 2009.
