= John McDonell (Upper Canada politician, died 1809) =

Canadian politician

A funeral monument in the village of Pointe-Fortune, Quebec in memory of John McDonell (1768-1850) a militia officer, fur trader, businessman, judge, civil servant and politician.

Captain John McDonell of Aberchalder (also spelled MacDonell; c. 1758-21 November 1809) was a soldier, judge, and political figure in Upper Canada following the American Revolution. He was elected as the first speaker for the Legislative Assembly of Upper Canada.

== Early years ==
John McDonell of Aberchalder was born at Aberchalder Lodge in Scotland, a son of Alexander MacDonell of Aberchalder. In 1773, he came to the Mohawk Valley of New York with his father and uncles.

In 1775, during the American Revolution, McDonell was commissioned in the Royal Highland Emigrants. On 1 August 1778, he transferred to John Butler's Rangers. For a time, he served as paymaster at Fort Niagara.

== Postwar life in Canada ==
When the Treaty of Paris ended the American Revolution in 1783, McDonell settled with other Highlander Loyalists along the St. Lawrence River in Upper Canada. He was appointed to the land board for the Lunenburgh District in 1788 and later for Glengarry & Stormont in 1792. He was appointed to the Court of Common Pleas and the district Court of Quarter Sessions. He was also named lieutenant for Glengarry County in 1792. He played an important role in the local militia, commanding the Upper Canada Battalion of the Royal Canadian Volunteer Regiment.

In 1792, McDonell and his brother Sir Hugh MacDonell of Aberchalder were elected to the Legislative Assembly representing Glengarry. John was chosen speaker and was reelected in 1796, but was unable to attend until 1798 due to illness. A slaveowner, he opposed the 1793 Act Against Slavery passed by the 1st Parliament of Upper Canada. John McDonell of Aberchalder died of what was described as a "severe cold" at Quebec City in 1809. He was 51 years old and was serving at the time with the 10th Royal Veteran Battalion.

Preceded by none	Speaker of the Legislative Assembly of Upper Canada; 1792–1796	Succeeded by Sir David William Smith, 1st Baronet
