= Butler's Rangers =

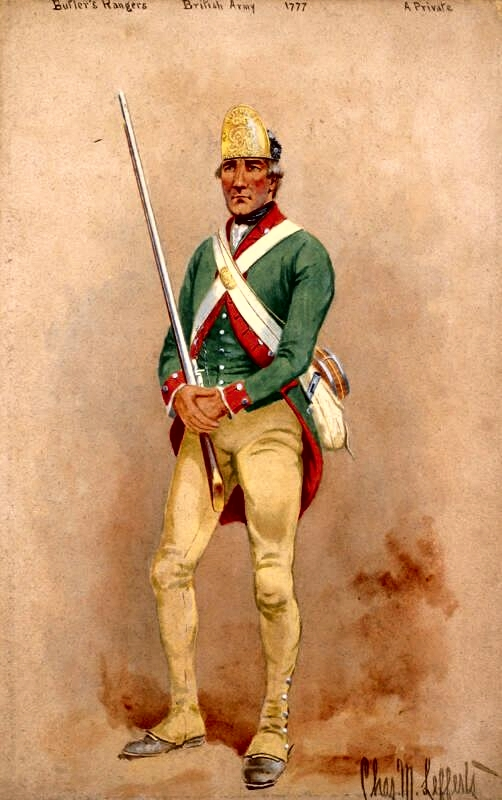
- A soldier in Butler's Rangers during the American Revolutionary War, wearing a green wool coat, buff trousers, and a brass regimental plate on a round wool hat, from a 1910 painting by American artist Charles M. Lefferts.
- Active: 1777-1784
- Country: Great Britain
- Branch: British provincial unit
- Type: Light infantry
- Role: Maneuver warfare Unconventional warfare
- Size: 573 men in 10 companies (1783)
- Engagements: American Revolutionary War: Battle of Wyoming (1778); Cherry Valley Raid (1778); Battle of Newtown (1779); Battle of Klock's Field (1780); Battle of Johnstown (1781); Battle of Sandusky (1782); Battle of Blue Licks (1782); Siege of Fort Henry (1782)

Commanders
- Notable commanders: Lieutenant Colonel John Butler; Captain Walter Butler; Captain William Caldwell; Captain Peter Hare; Captain John McDonell

Butler's Rangers (1777–1784) was a Loyalist provincial military unit of the American Revolutionary War, raised by American loyalist John Butler. Most members of the regiment were Loyalists from upstate New York and northeastern Pennsylvania. Their winter quarters were constructed on the west bank of the Niagara River, in what is now Niagara-on-the-Lake, Ontario. The Rangers fought principally in New York and Pennsylvania, but ranged as far west as Ohio and Michigan, and as far south as Virginia and Kentucky.

The Rangers were engaged in numerous violent raids that characterized the northern frontier of the American Revolutionary War, such as the Battle of Wyoming in July 1778 and the Cherry Valley massacre of November 1778. These actions earned the Rangers a reputation for ruthlessness.

== Formation ==
Similar to other Loyalist regiments that fought for the British Crown during the Revolutionary War, for example the King's Royal Regiment of New York, Butler's Rangers was made up of Loyalist refugees who had fled to Canada following the outbreak of the American Revolution. John Butler was a French and Indian War veteran and landowner with a 26,000 acre estate near Caughnawaga in the Mohawk Valley. On the outbreak of the American Revolutionary War, Butler abandoned these landholdings and fled to the Province of Quebec (now Canada) in the company of other Loyalist leaders, such as Daniel Claus and the Mohawk leader, Joseph Brant. During the war, John Butler also served as a deputy superintendent in the British Indian Department under Guy Johnson, another prominent Loyalist from the Mohawk Valley.

During the 1777 Saratoga Campaign, Butler persuaded about 350 Seneca warriors to participate in the Siege of Fort Stanwix, and led a group of Indian Department rangers at the Battle of Oriskany. As a result, Butler was granted permission in September 1777 to raise a “corps of rangers,” and was commissioned as its major commandant. Butler's Rangers would be based at Fort Niagara, and would work closely with Britain's native allies. Over the course of the war, the Rangers slowly grew from two companies in February 1778 to 10 companies by September 1781. Although the Rangers were headquartered at Fort Niagara, one company was later stationed at Detroit.

A number of Black Loyalists also served in Butler's Rangers. Most prominent among these was Richard Pierpoint, formerly a slave in the northern Thirteen Colonies. After the war, Pierpoint settled with the disbanded Rangers in Canada.

== Campaigns ==
In the summer of 1778, 110 Rangers under the command of Major Butler, accompanied by 464 mostly Seneca warriors, led by Sayenqueraghta and Cornplanter, destroyed the settlements in the Wyoming Valley in northeastern Pennsylvania. At the Battle of Wyoming on July 3, 1778, between 300 and 400 Patriot militia and Continentals were thoroughly routed by Butler's forces. The battle is frequently referred to as the Wyoming Massacre due to the large number of American soldiers who were scalped and killed by the Seneca as they fled the battlefield. A sensationalist and widely distributed newspaper report published a few weeks later falsely accused the Rangers of slaughtering women and children in the aftermath of the battle.

In September 1778, Captain William Caldwell’s company participated in the Attack on German Flatts that destroyed about 63 houses as well as barns and mills.

Two months later, Major Butler's son, Captain Walter Butler, commanded about 150 Rangers at the Cherry Valley Massacre. Unlike at Wyoming where few if any non-combatants were killed, Captain Butler was unable to prevent the Seneca killing 32 civilians including children. About 70 of the inhabitants were taken captive but most of the women and children were released two days later.

At the Battle of Newtown in August 1779, the Rangers, Brant's Volunteers and a contingent of Haudenosaunee and Munsee Delaware were unable to turn back the invasion of Haudenosaunee territory by the Continental Army during the Sullivan Campaign. The Rangers were forced to withdraw under sustained artillery fire when Major Butler became aware that his position was being flanked.

John Butler was promoted from Major to Lieutenant Colonel in the winter of 1780.

In October 1780, houses, barns, mills, and stores of grain and hay were burned as Loyalist forces led by Sir John Johnson marched down the Schoharie Valley to the Mohawk River, then headed west to destroy Stone Arabia. Four companies of Butler's Rangers under the command of Lt. Col. Butler took part in this action. Albany and Tryon County militia under the command of Brigadier General Robert Van Rensselaer engaged Johnson's men west of Stone Arabia at the inconclusive Battle of Klock's Field on October 19, 1780.

A year later, Major John Ross, commanding the 2nd Battalion of the King's Royal Regiment of New York, led a raid on the Mohawk Valley that destroyed Warrensborough to the east of Fort Hunter before heading to Johnstown. With Ross were three companies of Butler's Rangers commanded by Captain Butler. On October 25, 1781, Ross engaged several hundred patriot militia commanded by Colonel Marinus Willett at the Battle of Johnstown. Five days later, as Ross withdrew towards Oswego, a rear-guard action at West Canada Creek resulted in the death of Captain Butler.

In June 1782, Captain William Caldwell's company and their Shawnee allies forced Colonel William Crawford’s expedition to withdraw at the Battle of Sandusky. Caldwell was wounded early in the battle. In August, Caldwell crossed into Kentucky and after an unsuccessful attack on Bryan Station, defeated the patriot militia at the Battle of Blue Licks. A month later Captain Andrew Bradt's company was present at the unsuccessful Siege of Fort Henry, in what is now Wheeling, West Virginia.

== Officers ==
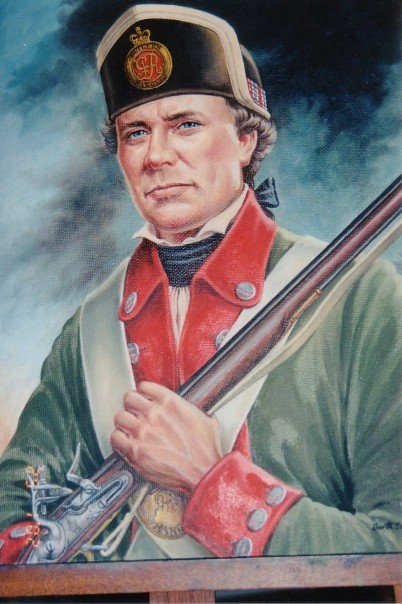
A likeness of Sgt. Jacob Dittrick, in Butler's Rangers uniform, by Canadian artist, Garth Dittrick

The company commanders of Butler's Rangers were:

- Captain Andrew Bradt
- Captain Walter Butler, John Butler's son, killed in action in 1781
- Captain William Caldwell, victor at the Battle of Sandusky and the Battle of Blue Licks
- Captain George Dame
- Captain Bernard Frey
- Captain Peter Hare
- Captain John McDonell
- Captain John McKinnon
- Captain Benjamin Pawling
- Captain Peter Ten Broeck
- Captain Andrew Thompson, fell overboard and drowned in Lake Erie in the fall of 1781 when returning from Detroit

== Uniforms and weapons ==
There is an historical debate as to what the Butler's Ranger uniform actually looked like.

- Variation A – Their uniforms consisted of a green woolen coat faced white and a white woolen waistcoat. Their pant garment was gaitered trousers made from Russia sheeting, a hemp product. Their hats were round hats, useful in shielding their faces from the sun. When in garrison or on parade, they could bring up the leaves of that hat to form a cocked hat. Their belting was black.
- Variation B – Dark green coats faced with scarlet and lined with the same, a waistcoat of green cloth, and Buckskin Indian leggings reaching from the ankle to the waist...their caps were almost skull caps of black jacket leather or turned up felt with a black cockade on the left side. Their belts were of buff leather and crossed at the breast where they were held in place by a brass plate marked in the same manner and with the same words as the cap plate. This version is based on supposition rather than primary source materials.

Butler's Rangers primarily used both the Long-Land and Short-Land forms of the Brown Bess musket. A mix of other firearms may have been used but would have created a supply issue due to calibre variations.

== Resettlement in Canada ==
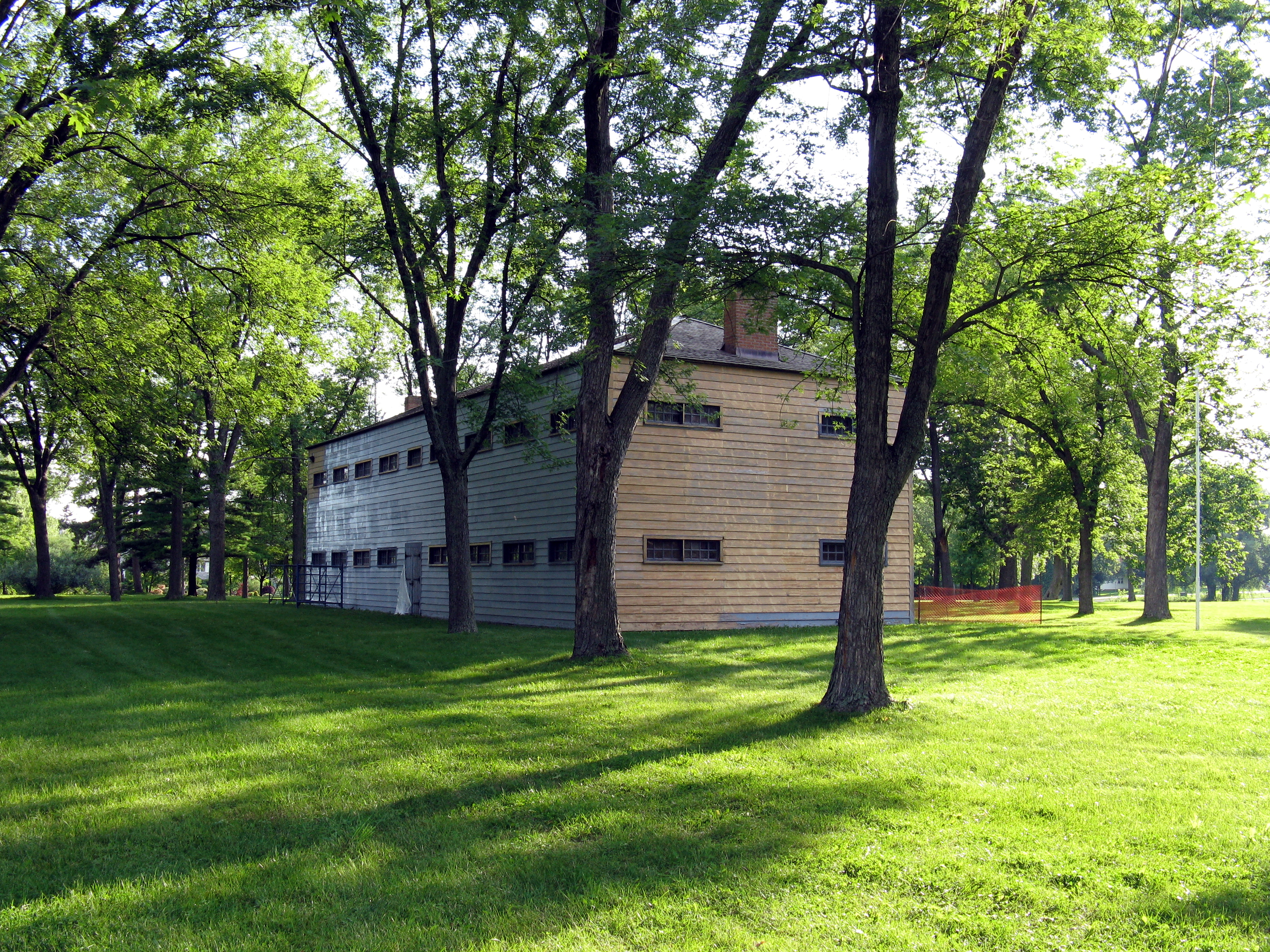
Butler's Barracks in Niagara-on-the-Lake

Butler's Rangers were disbanded in June 1784, and its veterans were given land grants in the Nassau District, now the Niagara region of Ontario, as a reward for their services to the British Crown. In 1788 the Nassau Militia was formed with John Butler as its Commander, filling its ranks with the demobilized officers and men of Butler's Rangers. In 1792 the county of Lincoln was formed and the name of the militia was changed to Lincoln Militia by 1793. The Lincoln Militia saw extensive fighting during the War of 1812 (1812–1815).

The Lincoln Militia still exists today as The Lincoln and Welland Regiment, a primary reserve regiment of the Canadian Forces, based in St. Catharines, Ontario. Although the building that houses The Lincoln and Welland Regiment Museum in Niagara-on-the-Lake is known as "Butler's Barracks", it is not the original barracks and never housed Butler's Rangers. It was built in the years following the War of 1812 to house the Indian Department, and received the name because Butler had been a Deputy Superintendent in that department.

== Bibliography ==
- Cruikshank, Ernest. Butler's Rangers and the Settlement of Niagara. Welland, Ontario, 1893.
- Smy, William A. An Annotated Nominal Roll of Butler’s Rangers 1777-1784: with Documentary Sources. Friends of the Loyalist Collection at Brock University, 2004.
- Swiggett, Howard. War Out of Niagara: Walter Butler and the Tory Rangers. Columbia University Press, 1933.
- Williams, Glenn F. Year of the Hangman: George Washington's Campaign Against the Iroquois. Westholme, 2006.

== Novels ==
- Brick, John. The King's Rangers. Doubleday and Company, 1954.
- References to this war are described in the novel "Zach" by William Bell
- Miller, Orlo. "Raiders of the Mohawk." Macmillian, 1966. A romanticized account based on the true life experiences of Daniel Springer, who served in the Rangers along with his older brother, Richard.
