= Battle of Johnstown =

1781 battle of the American Revolutionary War

Coordinates: 43°0′26″N 74°22′20″W

- Part of the American Revolutionary War
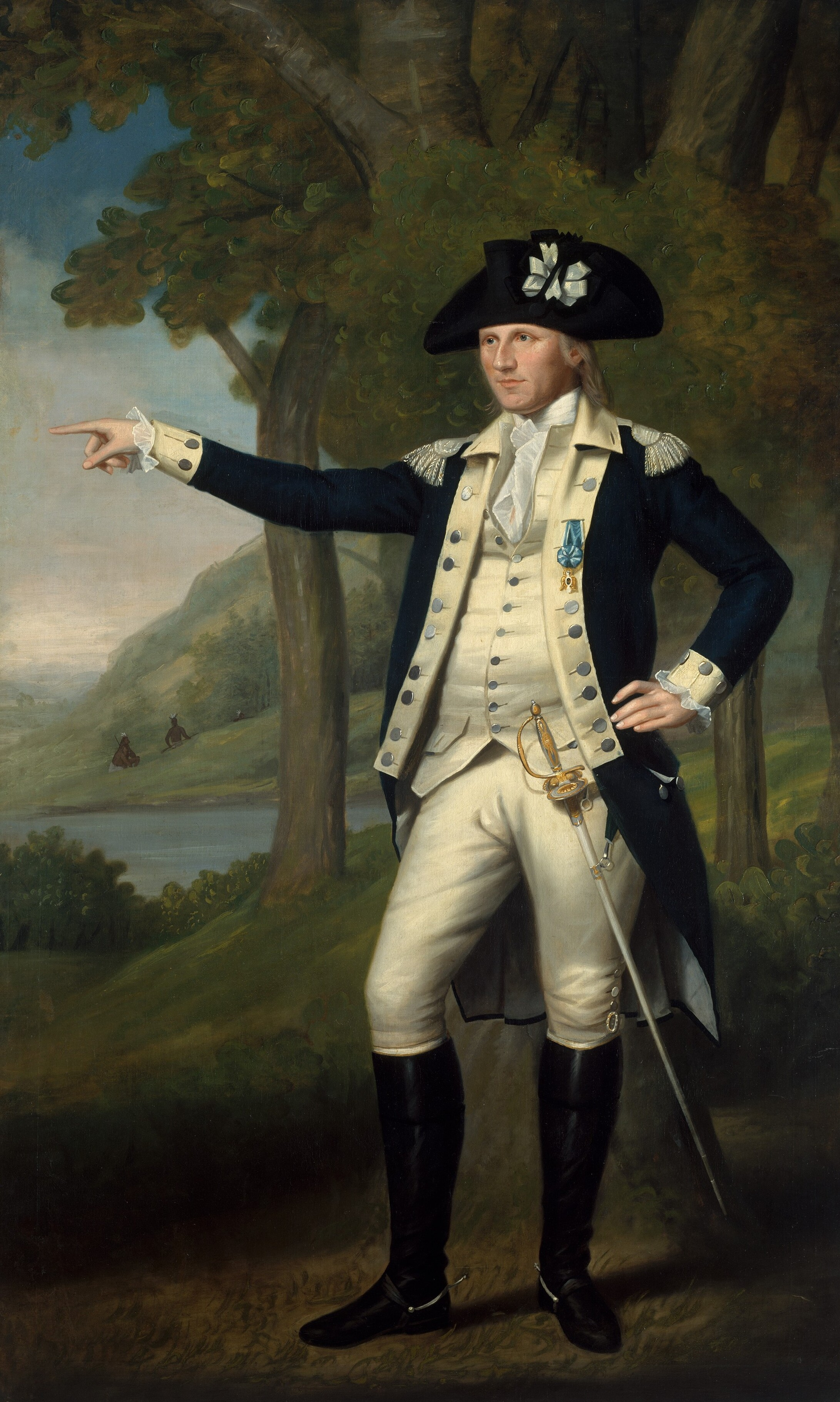
- Marinus Willett, the American commander in the battle
Date	October 25, 1781
Location	Johnstown, New York
Result	American victory

Belligerents
United States	Great Britain; Haudenosaunee

Commanders and leaders
Marinus Willett	John Ross; Walter Butler †

Strength
416	707

Casualties and losses
Total Losses:41; 12 killed; 24 wounded; 5 captured	Total Losses: 54; 11 killed; 11 wounded; 32 captured

The Battle of Johnstown was one of the last battles in the northern theater of the American Revolutionary War, with over 1,100 men engaged at Johnstown, New York on October 25, 1781. British regulars, Loyalist soldiers and Haudenosaunee (Iroquois) warriors, commanded by Major John Ross of the King's Royal Regiment of New York and Captain Walter Butler of Butler's Rangers, had destroyed the Mohawk Valley settlement of Warrensborough earlier that morning. Local American forces, led by Colonel Marinus Willett, caught up with Ross at Johnstown late that afternoon. After several hours of fighting, the British withdrew, but Captain Butler was killed five days later on October 30, fighting a rear-guard action at West Canada Creek.

== Background ==
New York's Mohawk Valley had been a major area of conflict throughout the American Revolutionary War. In 1780, raids conducted by Loyalist soldiers and Britain's Indigenous allies had devastated the valley. The fall crop of 1780 had been destroyed before harvest, and a number of settlements had been abandoned as settlers sought safety from the attacks.

In addition to the hundreds of buildings burned and 197 civilian deaths, these raids threatened the American supply route to the remaining outposts in the valley. The raids had also depleted the ranks of the local militia—decimated years earlier at the 1777 Battle of Oriskany—through desertions, casualties, and families abandoning their homes. In response to these threats, the Governor of New York, George Clinton, appointed Colonel Marinus Willett to take charge of the militia and organize the defense of the valley.

That spring and summer, there were a series of small clashes between British and American forces. On July 9, a Haudenosaunee and Loyalist war party under Lieutenant John Doxtader raided Currytown. Colonel Willett immediately pursued the raiders, routing them the following day and forcing them to abandon their plunder.

In the fall, however, a much larger force, several hundred strong, made up of British regulars, Loyalist provincial units and Haudenosaunee warriors entered the valley from the west. On October 24, they once again plundered Currytown, but did not burn any buildings to prevent rising smoke from warning Willett and the militia of their presence. Although Ross's men captured a pair of militia scouts, their disappearance and subsequent sightings by local settlers quickly spread the alarm through the valley. But before Willett was able to organize the valley's defense, the raiding party attacked Warrensborough on the south side of the Mohawk River. Major John Ross later reported that "before 12 O’clock the whole Settlement for seven miles was in flames, near 100 farms, three Mills and a large Granary for Public Service were reduced to Ashes, the Cattle and Stock of all kinds were likewise destroyed. The Inhabitants fled precipitately in the Night."

At Warrensborough, Ross learned that "the Rebels were on their march from every Quarter." He decided that the expedition would ford the Mohawk River near Johnstown, then head north through the wilderness to Carleton Island.

== Battle ==
Willett gathered a force of 416 militiamen and began pursuing the raiding party. He encountered Ross's men at Johnstown late in the afternoon of October 25. As the forces met, a series of small skirmishes broke out in and around the village.

Ross had over 700 men under his command, including 155 British regulars and 310 provincials from Butler's Rangers, the King's Royal Regiment of New York and Leake's Independent Company. Also with the expedition were roughly 100 Haudenosaunee warriors under the direction of Captain Gilbert Tice of the British Indian Department and Mohawk war chief David Hill (Karonghyontye).

Willett was outnumbered, but he divided his forces and sent half his men with Major Aaron Rowley around the enemy flank to attack them from the rear. He advanced with the rest across an open field towards the British, who had formed lines at the edge of a wood. An intense fight followed, during which the only artillery piece on the field—originally in the possession of Willett's men—was captured and recaptured repeatedly. For unknown reasons, the militia on the American right flank suddenly turned and fled. Willett was saved by the arrival of Rowley’s force, which struck the British right flank just as Ross was about to exploit the collapse of the American line. The engagement then dissolved into chaotic, small-unit actions. Fighting continued sporadically, but as darkness fell, Ross ordered his men to withdraw.

Ross later reported 11 killed, 11 wounded and 32 taken prisoner, while the Americans suffered 12 killed, 24 wounded and 5 taken prisoner.

Ross subsequently allowed some of his prisoners to escape. The prisoners had been falsely told that the British intended to head west. Based on this false intelligence, Willett proceeded to Stone Arabia, but after several hours waiting for Ross to appear, he realized he had been deceived. On October 28, his scouts discovered Ross's trail. Willett immediately set out in pursuit with 400 troops and 60 Oneida warriors.

Despite wet snow and rain, which slowed both forces, Willett caught up with the British rear guard near West Canada Creek on October 30. In the ensuing skirmish Walter Butler was killed. Witnesses to the skirmish later provided several contradictory accounts, including claims that Butler shouted, "Shoot and be damned," and that Louis Cook (Akiatonharónkwen), who led a contingent of Oneida that had joined Willett after the Battle of Johnstown, fired the fatal shot. Most accounts agree that Butler was killed by a shot to the head from an Oneida warrior, that he was scalped and stripped of his uniform, and that his corpse was left at the scene.

Willett decided to discontinue the pursuit. Ross continued north and reached Carleton Island on November 6.

== Aftermath ==
Willett's victory at Johnstown occurred at about the same time that word reached the area of the British surrender at Yorktown. Consequently, it marked the last significant engagement in the Mohawk Valley.
