= Michael Grass =

Captain Michael Grass (c.1735–1813) was a French-born militia captain who was loyal to the British and led a contingent of United Empire Loyalists to Canada after the American War of Independence. He was one of the founders of Kingston, Ontario.

== Early years ==
Michael Grass was born in Strasbourg, Alsace around 1735, emigrated to America, and settled in Philadelphia in 1752. During his years in Philadelphia, he worked as a tanner and saddler. He later moved to New York City and then to Tryon County, New York where he began farming as well as continued his vocation of saddler.

== Seven Years' War and the American Revolution ==
Grass served in the British regiment in New York during the Seven Years' War. During this time Grass was apparently captured by French forces and imprisoned at Fort Frontenac around 1756, where he gained an appreciation for the Cataraqui area. In 1777, at the beginning of the American Revolution, Grass returned to New York City because Tryon County became too dangerous for Loyalists. While in New York he served as a lieutenant in the New York City Militia.

== Loyalist leader ==
In 1783, Grass and a group of Loyalist families were sent by Sir Guy Carleton to settle on the north shore of Lake Ontario. He was placed in charge of eight companies of Loyalists, consisting of up to a thousand people. From New York City they headed to Sorel, Quebec in the fall of 1783 and were given permission later that year by Governor Frederick Haldimand to settle at the location preferred by Grass - Cataraqui (later named Kingston). Grass arrived with about fifty families in 1784.

Grass is considered one of the founders of Kingston, Ontario. He became a leader in the new community, creating one of the first permanent English-speaking towns in Canada. He was appointed a magistrate and performed many of the marriages in Kingston during these early years In Kingston, Ontario, a street is named after Michael Grass. As well, the publishing house Michael Grass House bears his name.
