= Carleton Island =

Island in the St. Lawrence River, New York

- Location within New York

Geography
- Location: St. Lawrence River at Cape Vincent, Jefferson County, New York
- Coordinates: 44°10′43″N 76°17′17″W
- Area: 2.8 sq mi (7.3 km^{2})
- Highest elevation: 331 ft (100.9 m)

Administration
- New York
- County: Jefferson County

Demographics
- Population: 34 homes with 54 residents (2008)

Carleton Island is located in the St Lawrence River in upstate New York. One of the Thousand Islands, it is part of the Town of Cape Vincent, in Jefferson County.

== History ==
Originally held by the Iroquois, one of the first Europeans to take notice of the island was Pierre François Xavier de Charlevoix, in 1720. He called it Isle aux Chevreuils, the Island of Roe Bucks, and wrote in 1721 that its bays could be useful. A 1779 map of the Province of New York indicates that the island was at one time called Isle a la Biche, French for Doe Island. It was also referred to as Buck Island or Deere Island. The island was renamed Carleton Island after Major General Sir Guy Carleton, Governor of the Province of Quebec. It was one of several islands in the area that were named by John Graves Simcoe after General James Wolfe's adjutants in the Battle of the Plains of Abraham. The largest is Wolfe island, while the others are Howe Island, Amherst Island, and Gage Island (now Simcoe Island).

During the American Revolutionary War the British used the island as a military supply transshipment location, naval station, and for building ships. Fort Haldimand was built to defend the station and shipyard. The island also served as a base for raids against American towns and Loyalists used the island as a refuge to escape rebel persecution. After the war the island was ceded to the Americans.

In 1783, the Crawford Purchase was signed on the island. This agreement surrendered lands that extended west along the north shore of the St. Lawrence River and Lake Ontario from the Mississaugas to the British Crown to enable Loyalist settlement in what is now a part of eastern Ontario, Canada.

The island is now used mainly for recreation and tourism purposes.

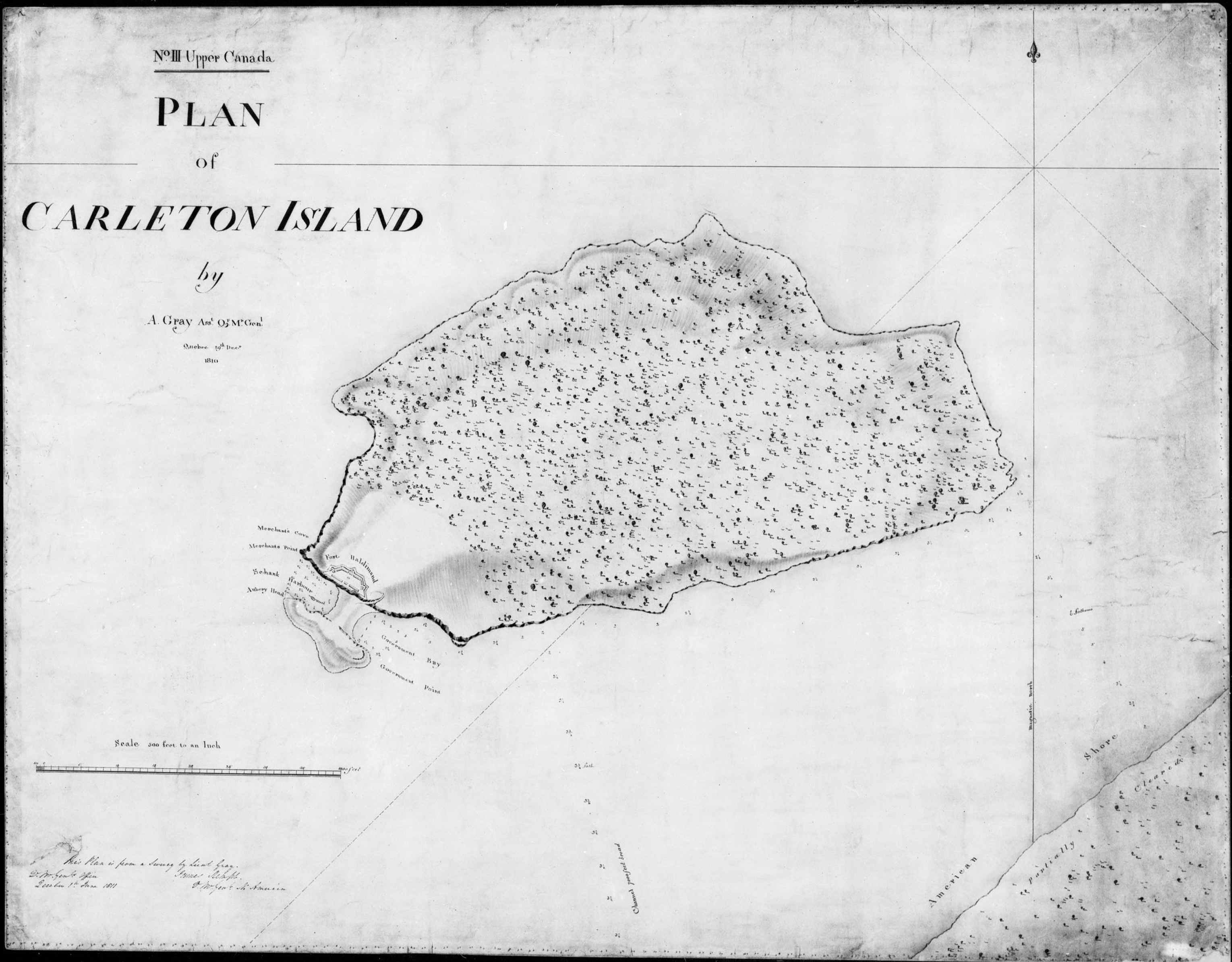
Map of Carleton Island, 1810

=== Naval base and Fort Haldimand ===
- Fort Haldimand Site
- U.S. National Register of Historic Places
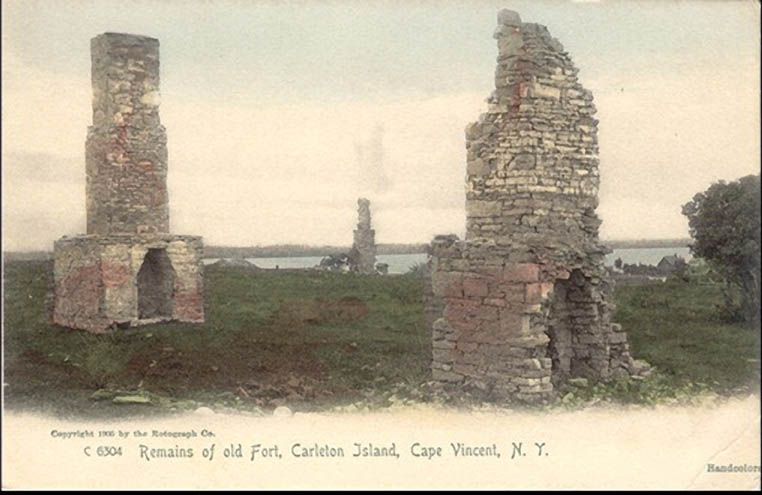
- Remains of Fort Haldimand, 1906

- Location within New York
- Nearest city: Cape Vincent, New York
- Area: 25 acres (10 ha)
- Built: 1778
- Built by: Twiss, William
- NRHP reference No.: 78001854
- Added to NRHP: December 15, 1978

After the fall of New France at the end of the Seven Years' War, maintaining inland water routes in the Great Lakes for the purpose of commerce and transportation was important to the British. With the outbreak of rebellion against the British which led to the American Revolutionary War, it became especially important to secure supply lines and military supremacy on Lake Ontario. For these reasons, in 1778, Governor Frederick Haldimand ordered a survey to determine the best location for a naval station. The former French post at Cataraqui (the present day Kingston, Ontario) and Buck Island (later renamed Carleton Island) were considered, but Buck Island was chosen because it was deemed more defensible. The island became a transshipment point for supplies, became the main base for British ships on Lake Ontario, and the construction of a fort was started (but never completed).

Fort Haldimand, initially called Fort Carleton, was strategically important as well as a centre of shipbuilding. The fort was built in 1778 and named after British General Frederick Haldimand. It was built on the southwest end of the island, shaped as a partial octagon, and consisted of bastions, ditches, barracks and magazines. The ruins of the fort can still be seen at the southwest end of the island along northeast side of North Bay.

Several British regiments garrisoned the fort, including the Royal Artillery, the Royal Marines, Butler's Rangers, the King's Royal Regiment of New York, and the Royal Highland Emigrants.

Three known burial grounds are located near the fort:

- Military burial grounds – 25 burials located on the north side and beyond the walls of the fort.
- Indian burial grounds – located on the northwest shore near the fort
- Civilian burial grounds – located east of the fort

The Fort Haldimand Site is owned and protected by the Thousand Islands Land Trust, and was added to the National Register of Historic Places in 1978.

=== Dockyard and shipbuilding ===
Projecting from the location of the fort is Government Point, notched by two small bays:

- North Bay or Schank's Harbor was home to Carleton Island Dockyard, a shipyard that operated from 1774 to 1792. Likely named for John Schank, a British shipbuilder. A military dock was located on the southwest end of the bay at Aubrey's Head
- South Bay or Government Bay/Harbor was used by Royal Navy/Provincial Marine vessels servicing the fort until 1789.

Many ships for the war were built at the island along the southeast shores of North Bay, including the recently discovered HMS Ontario. Other known vessels built include:

- HMS Mississauga 1792 – warship
- HMS Limnade 1780–81 – warship

The wreck of HMS Haldimand, a 150-ton British snow schooner built in 1771, lies in North Bay.

When the island was ceded to the Americans, naval operations and shipbuilding activities were moved to Kingston.

=== Loyalist refuge ===
Since Carleton Island was in the hands of the British, Loyalists who were escaping rebel persecution fled to the island, built homes and carried on merchant businesses. Among the businessmen was future politician and judge Richard Cartwright. Another notable resident of Carleton Island who was loyal to the British Crown was Molly Brant, sister of Six Nations leader Joseph Brant. When the island was ceded to the United States after the Revolutionary War, many of these civilian residents moved to nearby Cataraqui (now Kingston, Ontario).

Merchants and their warehouses were located northwest of the fort in an area known as Merchant's Cove and Merchant's Point.

Loyalist forces and natives who supported the Loyalist cause used the island as a base to attack revolutionary forces. Battles in which these forces participated include Cherry Valley, and Wyoming.

=== Demise ===
At the close of the American War of Independence, under the terms of the Jay Treaty, the British ceded Carleton Island, along with other forts, to the Americans. The forts were apparently not, however, abandoned by the British at that time.

Construction of the fort was halted in 1783 and the post was abandoned in 1812. The ruins of the fort now consists of the outline of ramparts and barrack's chimney as the fort's buildings (barracks, magazine house) were made of wood and were lost over time. The fort is now covered by tree growth along the northeast shore of North Bay.

During the War of 1812, Carleton Island was captured without bloodshed by three freelancing Americans, though it was already nominally American territory due to the Jay Treaty. It remained claimed by the British until in 1817. In 1817, the State Legislature of New York annexed the island to Jefferson County, and granted 500 acres (2.0 km^{2}) of its land to the local New York postmaster, Charles Smyth. The island had been a haven for smugglers, and later that year a Canadian tax collector seized some tobacco from the island. This dispute escalated, and Governor DeWitt Clinton of New York threatened hostilities. Soon Secretary of State John Quincy Adams was called upon to sort out the matter. After contentious negotiations, the island was retained by the United States and was turned over to peaceful pursuits of farming (now abandoned), sport-fishing, and summer tourism. No one lives on the island year-round.

== Administration ==
- New France 1720s–1763
- Province of Quebec (British America and then British North America) 1778–1791
- Upper Canada (British North America) 1792–1794
- New York State 1817–present (nominally since 1794 under the Jay Treaty)

== Wyckoff Villa ==
In 1890s Wyckoff Villa was built by William O. Wyckoff, a sales agent for E. Remington and Sons, who later formed the Standard Typewriter Manufacturing Company, Incorporated in 1886. Designed by William Henry Miller, the 15,000-square-foot (1,400 m^{2}), 11-bedroom Richardsonian Romanesque-Tudor Revival hybrid mansion was occupied briefly as Wyckoff died a day after moving into it in 1895. The property was briefly held by General Electric, which had intended to transform it into a corporate retreat; however, these plans were abandoned during World War II. The mansion is crumbling; removal of windows and doors during World War II left it open to the elements and both the stone foundation and the wooden upper floors have deteriorated. Its tower has collapsed. As of 2018, the mansion is offered for sale.

== Carleton Island today ==
There are 34 homes, most of which are located along the shores of the island. The homes are connected by Carleton Island Road 1 and Carleton Island Road 2, a series of dirt trails used by residents on ATVs.

A pair of silos on one property on the southeast side of have been converted to private residences that double as observation towers. There are several boat houses located along South Bay.

The island was once served by a ferry running from the island to the village of Cape Vincent, but it is no longer in service. Today, the only way to get to the island from the mainland and surrounding islands is by private boat. Area residents use their own private boats as most homes have their own piers to dock their vessels.

== See also ==
- Point Frederick (Kingston, Ontario)
- Kingston Royal Naval Dockyard
- Grindstone Island
- Murray Isle
- Wellesley Island
