= Charles M. Lefferts =

American artist (1873–1923)

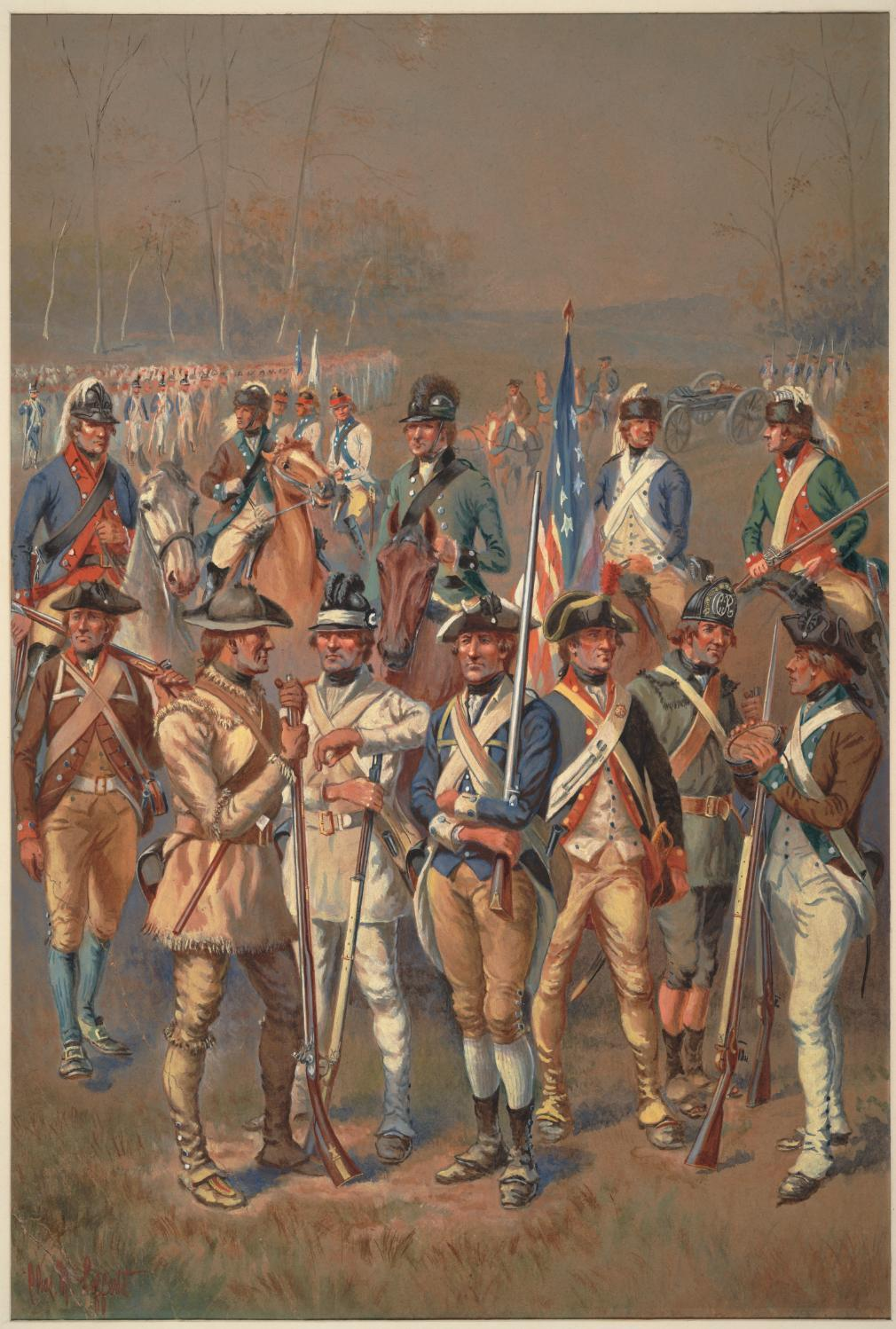
- A 1909 watercolor painting, by Charles M. Lefferts, a noted American artist, military historian, and member of the New York Historical Society, depicting a variety of Continental Army uniforms, from the American Revolutionary War.
- Born: Charles MacKubin Lefferts; April 19, 1873; New York City
- Died: March 17, 1923 (aged 49); Port Washington, New York, US
- Known for: Illustration

Charles MacKubin Lefferts (April 19, 1873 – March 17, 1923) was an American illustrator and soldier. He served on and off in the New York National Guard from 1893 onwards and enlisted in the federal army in 1917. He retired from the army in 1921, having attained the rank of Lieutenant. In his early years he lived in Wilkes-Barre, Pennsylvania, where he met his future wife Anne Harrison.

Lefferts spent most of his time outside of the military studying uniforms of the American Revolution. A self-taught artist, he recorded his meticulous research efforts by making many illustrations of uniforms used by all of the forces involved in the war and also by collection illustrations made by other artists. He was made a member of the New York Historical Society in 1909. Three years after his death, the society published many of his images and their descriptions in a book titled Uniforms of the Armies in the War of the American Revolution, 1775–1783.
