= John Enys =

John Enys may refer to:

- John Enys (British Army officer)
- John Enys (naturalist)
- John Samuel Enys, British mining engineer and scientist
