= Carleton's Raid =

British raid during American Revolutionary War

- Part of the American Revolutionary War
Date	October 24 – November 14, 1778
Location	New York and Vermont shores of Lake Champlain
Result	British victory

Belligerents
United States	Great Britain

Commanders and leaders
Seth Warner	Christopher Carleton

Strength
Unknown number of local militia	454 soldiers plus sailors on the ships

Casualties and losses
79 captured, unknown killed and wounded	1 killed, 17 missing, 1 wounded

Carleton's Raid was a raid led by British Major Christopher Carleton during the American War of Independence. It was launched in the fall 1778 from the Province of Quebec against targets in upstate Province of New York. (Note: Which included lands in today’s State of Vermont)

== Prelude ==
On October 24, 1778, with snow already on the ground but before Lake Champlain had frozen, a fleet of ships left Ile aux Noix for the southern part of Lake Champlain. The ships were HMS Carleton and HMS Maria, both of which had fought at the Battle of Valcour Island in 1776.

I propose to send a respectable party, which will be covered by some ships and Gun Boats, and that it shall be as late as possible in going out as the damage it may then do the enemy will be irreparable this season.

— Frederick Haldimand, Governor of Quebec

The ships were supported by two gunboats and many bateaux. The force comprised 454 men. The British Army forces were made up of regulars from the 29th, 31st, 53rd Regiments of Foot and the Royal Artillery supported by Loyalists from the King's Royal Regiment of New York, Hessian Jägers and about 100 Indian allies. The force was led by Major Christopher Carleton of the 29th Regiment of Foot.

== Attacks ==
The fleet moved up the lake to about Crown Point on November 6, 1778, where parties of raiders were let off to attack Reymond's Mill on Beaver Creek, and Middlebury and New Haven on Otter Creek. The fleet then moved to Buttonmold Bay on November 7, where more raiding parties were sent to attack military supplies and Black powder, the town of Monkton, Vermont, and to Moore's Mill near Shoreham, Vermont, a meeting place for the Green Mountain Boys. At Moore's Mill the raiding party ran into a group of local militia, and there was a 20-minute skirmish before the local militia retired. One British soldier was wounded during this fight; American casualties are unknown.

When the force returned to Ile aux Noix on November 14, Major Carleton reported the raid had destroyed enough supplies for 12,000 men for a four-month campaign. This included a saw mill, a grist mill, 47 houses, 48 barns, 28 stacks of wheat, and 75 stacks of hay. Over 80 head of cattle were captured and brought back to Quebec. Thirty-nine prisoners were taken to Saint-Jean-sur-Richelieu and forty to Quebec City over land through northern Vermont by Indians. The only Continental Army units in the area were Whitcomb's Rangers at Rutland, Vermont and Seth Warner's Green Mountain Boys at Fort Edward. The raid had been expected by the American forces, but because it occurred late in the year, most troops had gone into winter quarters and were not in a position to stop it.

The British losses during the raid were one man killed by a falling tree, one bateau lost with 17 men on the lake on the return voyage to Ile aux Noix, and one wounded at the fight at Moore's Mill. The raid was followed up in 1780 by multiple raids called the Burning of the Valleys. Major Carleton lead a force down Lake Champlain again, while Sir John Johnson lead a force through the Schoharie and Mohawk valleys, and Lieutenant Houghton lead a raid towards the Connecticut River in the Royalton Raid.
