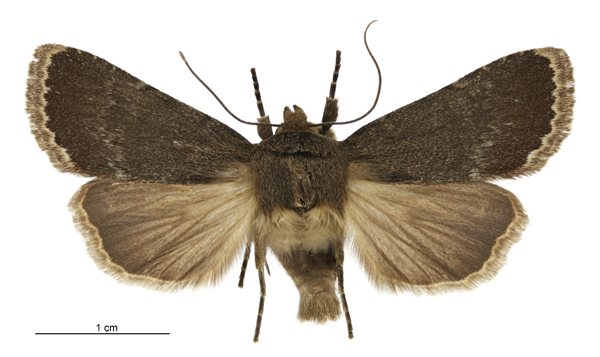
- Female
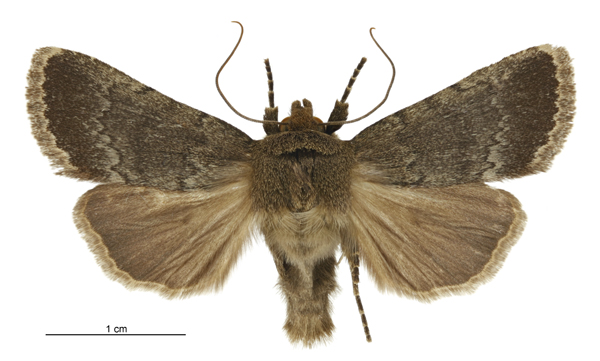
- Male

Scientific classification
- Kingdom: Animalia
- Phylum: Arthropoda
- Class: Insecta
- Order: Lepidoptera
- Superfamily: Noctuoidea
- Family: Noctuidae
- Genus: Bityla
- Species: B. sericea

Binomial name
- Bityla sericea Butler, 1877

Synonyms
- Orthosia pallida Hudson, 1905; Bityla pallida (Hudson, 1905)

= Bityla sericea =

Species of moth

Bityla sericea is a species of moth in the family Noctuidae. This species is endemic to New Zealand. It is classified as "At Risk, Naturally Uncommon" by the New Zealand Department of Conservation.

== Taxonomy ==
This species was first described by Arthur Gardiner Butler in 1877 using a specimen obtained from John Enys and collected in the South Island. George Hudson discussed and illustrated this species both in his 1898 book, New Zealand moths and butterflies (Macro-lepidoptera) and his 1928 publication The Butterflies and Moths of New Zealand. In 1905 Hudson, thinking he was describing a new species, also gave the species the name Orthosia pallida. George Francis Hampson, also mistakenly believing this was a separate species placed O. pallida in the genus Bityla. Hudson discussed B. pallida in his 1928 publication. John S. Dugdale synonymised B. pallida with B. sericea in 1988. The holotype specimen of B. sericea is held at the Natural History Museum, London.

== Description ==
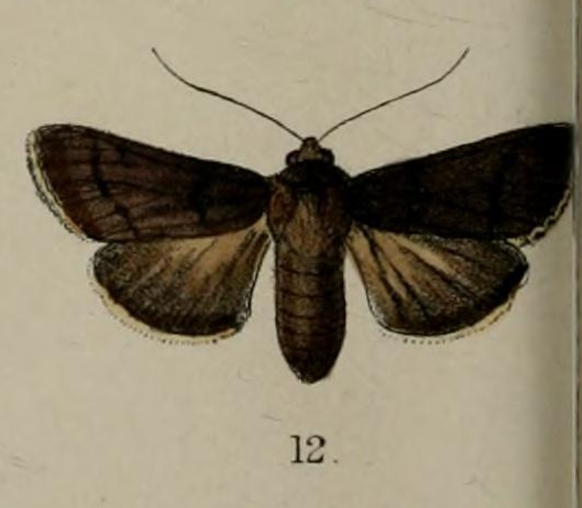
Illustration of Bityla sericea by Edgar Albert Smith

Butler described the species as follows:

Primaries shining greyish brown, crossed by two widely separated and slightly diverging dusky lines, the inner one in the shape of a }, the outer one composed of small lunules with whitish exterior margins; outer margin undulated, fringe silky whitish; secondaries pale brown, fringe sandy whitish; thorax greyish brown,' collar slightly darker; abdomen ? : primaries below pale grey, costa and fringe whitish; secondaries whitish, with a submarginal indistinct grey band, and the outer border, of the same tint, fringe whitish; pectus sandy yellowish, dusky in front; legs sandy yellowish, banded with black. Expanse of wings 1 inch 6 lines.

Although similar in appearance to Bityla defigurata, B. sericea can be distinguished from it as B. sericea has a pale fringe on its forewing.

== Distribution ==
This species is endemic to New Zealand. The species has been found in Wellington, Marlborough, North Canterbury, Mid Canterbury, Central Otago and at the Otago Lakes areas. Hudson mentions the species was also collected in Thames and in Napier.

== Behaviour and life cycle ==
The adult moths are on the wing from February to May. They are attracted to light.

== Host species and habitat ==
The host of the larvae of B. sericea is unknown but they probably feed on Muehlenbeckia species.

== Conservation status ==
This species has been classified as having the "At Risk, Naturally Uncommon" conservation status under the New Zealand Threat Classification System.
