= Davies-Gilbert =

The Davies-Gilbert family developed the towns of Eastbourne and East Dean in Sussex in the 19th century. They also owned the Estate of Trelissick, Truro (Cornwall) from 1844 until it was sold in 1913. There is some disagreement whether they are related to the Gilberts of Compton, Devon (whose most famous member was Sir Humphrey Gilbert) however, family research carried out in the late 18th century did not reveal a definitive link. There has been no research carried out since then. The earliest traceable member of the family is Thomas Gilbert (d. 1567). The family has the motto: (Motto: Mallem Mori Quam Mutare/ I Prefer Death to Change / How much do evil ways change us)

Famous family members include Davies Gilbert (1767-1839, known as Davies Giddy before 1818). He was an engineer, author and High Sheriff of Cornwall. He was President of the Royal Society of Science from 1827 to 1830, and was a Member of Parliament as well. There have been several books written about, or by, the family. The book Beyond the blaze is the most famous of these.

== Famous members of the family ==
- Davies Giddy (later Gilbert) - President of the Royal Society of Science, High Sheriff of Cornwall, Member of Parliament

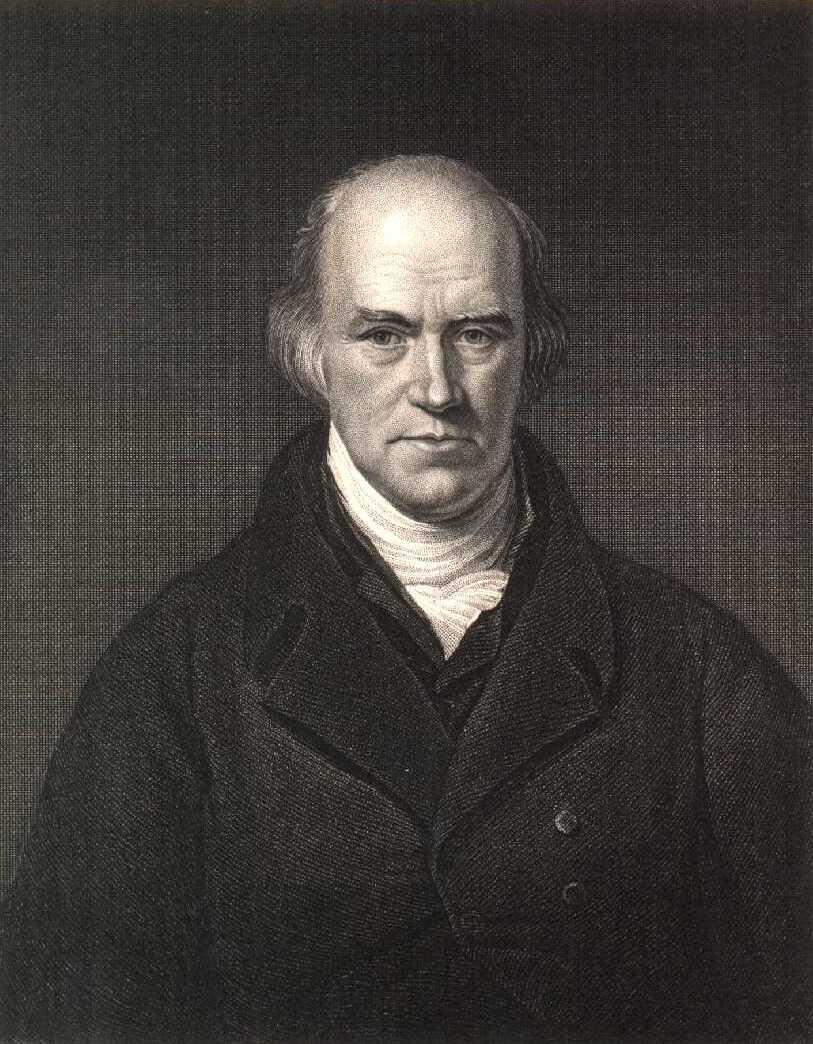
Davies Giddy, President of the Royal Society

- Mary Ann Gilbert, agronomist, wife of Davies Gilbert
- John Davies Gilbert (1811–1854) - developed the town of Eastbourne and East Dean in Sussex. Bought Trelissick in Feock, Cornwall. F.R.S.
- Carew Davies-Gilbert (died 1913) - continued his father's work in developing the Eastbourne and East Dean

== Other information ==
- At Harrow School another line of the family with the surname 'Rendall' founded a house in that name (Rendalls House). Three members of the family have plaques in their name in the Chapel at Harrow.
- The Christmas Carol The First Nowell was arranged and extra lyrics added by Davies Gilbert, transforming it into the modern carol.
- The Davies-Gilbert crest is that of a red squirrel secant gules cracking a nut and on the shoulder a cross crosslet gold.
- The Family has a polo team, 'Sciurus Polo' (Sciurus is Latin for squirrel) which plays in both Argentina and the UK

Books and publications written or edited by Davies Gilbert Sources: British Library Integrated Catalogue and Cornwall County Library Catalogue

Plain Statement of the Bullion Question (1811) Some ancient Christmas Carols, with the Tunes to which they were formerly sung in the West of England. Collected by D. Gilbert. London : J. Nichols and Son, 1822. Some ancient Christmas Carols, with the tunes to which they were formerly sung in the west of England. pp. x. 79. J. Nichols and Son: London, 1823 Some Ancient Christmas Carols with Tunes to which they were Formerly Sung in the West of England (1822)[4] "On the vibrations of heavy bodies in cycloidal and in circular arches, as compared with their descents through free space; including an estimate of the variable circular excess in vibrations continually decreasing." By Davies Gilbert, .. London : printed by William Clowes, [1823] 15,[3]p. 'Extracted from the Quarterly Journal, Vol. XV'. A Cornish Cantata. [Names of places in Cornwall arranged in the form of verses.] [Privately printed? East-Bourne] 1826.

Mount Calvary; or, the History of the Passion, Death and Resurrection of Jesus Christ, written in Cornish (as it may be conjectured) some centuries past. Interpreted in English, in ... 1682, by J. Keigwin . Edited by D. Gilbert. pp. xxii. 96. Nichols and Son: London, 1826. "On the expediency of assigning Specific Names to all such Functions of Simple Elements as represent definite physical properties; with the suggestion of a new term in mechanics; illustrated by an investigation of the Machine moved by Recoil" ... From the Philosophical Transactions. pp. 14. [Privately printed:] London, 1827. "Some Collections and Translations respecting St. Neot, and the former state of his Church." In : Hedgeland (J. P.) A Description ... of the ... decorations ... in the Church of St. Neot, etc. 1830. A Cornish dialogue between Tom Pengersick and Dic. Trengurtha. East-Bourn : Davies Gilbert, [ca. 1835](In verse.) The Parochial History of Cornwall, founded on, [or rather including,] the manuscript histories of Mr. Hals and Mr. Tonkin; with additions and various appendices, by D. G. [including copious extracts from J. Whitaker, D. and S. Lysons, &c. and geological notices by Dr. Boase]. 4 vol. London, 1838.

Carew Davies-Gilbert ( – 1913) There is a postcard entitled 'The Funeral of Carew Lewis Gilbert Esq Dec 5 '13' photographer Veiler.

== Bibliography ==
- A. C. Todd, Beyond the Blaze: A biography of Davies Gilbert, with D. Bradford Barton, 1967.
