= Enys family of Enys in Cornwall =

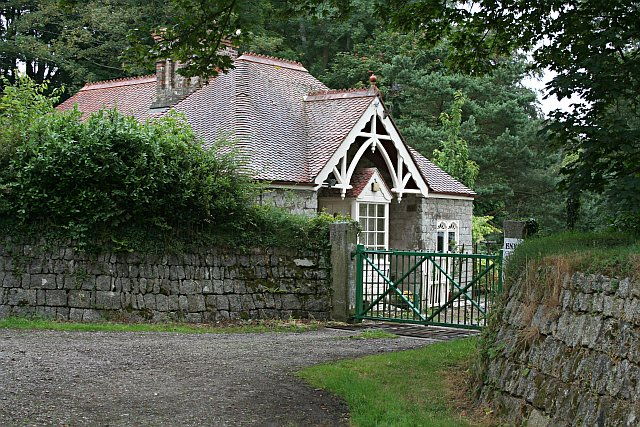
The Lodge, Enys Estate, St Gluvias, Cornwall

The Enys family have lived at Enys, which lies on the northern outskirts of Penryn, Cornwall, since the reign of Edward I, according to the website of the Enys Trust. The 1709 edition of Camden's Magna Britannia mentioned that Enys was noted for its fine gardens.

== The House and garden ==
The Enys Trust was formed in 2002 as a charity in order to secure the long-term future of the garden at Enys, near Penryn in Cornwall, and to open the garden to the public. In 2013 the house was opened to the public for the first time.

John Enys greatly enriched Enys with seeds and plants he regularly sent home from New Zealand and Patagonia.

The lakes in the lower valley have a water wheel which raised water to the house. The scenery created here has been much photographed over the years. In Spring the bluebells in the parkland, known as Parc Lye, are a sight to behold. This area is believed to be undisturbed since ancient times, and contains many trees of a great age. The formal gardens still contain plants shrubs and trees from the J D Enys Collection, and the Estate also has a fine collection of bamboos comprising a number of very rare varieties.

Probably the most valuable asset to the garden is its microclimate. It is virtually frost free, and this, together with the mild and temperate influence of the Gulf Stream, enables many tender plants and trees to flourish. One of the most important of these is the "Peruvian Laurel", one of the few specimens growing in England today. There is also a Maidenhair tree, (Ginkgo biloba) which is said to be the tallest specimen outside Kew Gardens.

== Public service ==
Samuel Enys represented Penryn in Parliament in 1660.

The family has supplied the Duchy of Cornwall with several High Sheriffs and the Quarter Sessions with many J.P.s

=== Enys family High Sheriffs of Cornwall ===
- 1708–1709: Samuel Enys
- 1796: John Enys
- 1824: John Samuel Enys
- 1876: Francis Gilbert Enys

== Selected Enys family members ==
=== Samuel and Valentine Enys ===
Samuel Enys and his son Valentine were merchants, trading between the river Fal and Spain.

Samuel was a younger son (his father was also called Samuel Enys). He was a highly successful merchant and was able to buy back the Enys family's land, that had to be sold and mortgaged during the first half of the 17th century. He also built a large house on the waterfront at Penryn. He married Elizabeth Pendarves and they had four sons, Samuel (again), John, Valentine and Richard. They were trained as merchants.

Valentine Enys (1653–1719) was the third of four sons of Samuel and Elizabeth. He was a merchant, who exported salted pilchards to the Canary Islands and imported Canary wine. Extracts from his letter-book have been published. June Palmer, the editor of the book, placed a transcript of all the letters, other than those in the Spanish language in the Cornwall Record Office. The Letter-book remains in private hands. The publication is a remarkable source for maritime history and the life of a remarkable Cornishman.

=== John Enys, soldier ===
John Enys (17 December 1757 – 30 July 1818), son of John Enys and Lucy Basset, was British soldier during the American Revolution and the War with France.

=== John Samuel Enys ===
John Samuel Enys was born 21 September 1796, son of Samuel Hunt and Luce Ann Enys, his wife, the daughter of Samuel Enys. In 1813, his mother reverted her name from Hunt to Enys, after the death of her husband. He was High Sheriff of Cornwall in 1824. In 1833 John Samuel Enys engaged Henry Harrison, a London architect, to produce designs for the garden as well as the house. Amongst these features was the Ladies Garden, later called the Flower Garden"

He married, on 17 April 1834 Catherine Gilbert, eldest daughter of Davies Gilbert (1767–1839), a President of the Royal Society and Mary Ann Gilbert (c. 1776 – 26 April 1845), his wife. They had three sons- the second being the naturalist John Davies Enys (11 October 1837 – 7 Nov 1912; see below)- and two daughters. None of the sons married. On August 28, 1860, Jane Mary Enys married Captain Henry Rogers RN.

=== John Davies Enys ===
John Enys was the son of John Samuel Enys and Catherine Gilbert and was educated at Harrow School. In the 1850s he attended lectures at the Geological Society of London, took walking tours in Britain and carefully recorded discoveries of ferns, wild-flowers and shells, establishing a pattern of life as an inveterate collector and keen amateur naturalist.

He settled on South Island, New Zealand, at Castle Hill, where he raised sheep and studied the local fauna, flora and geology. He was joined by his brother, Charles.
