= Thomas Bond (topographer) =

British topographer

- Born: 1765; Looe, Cornwall, England
- Died: 18 December 1837 (aged 71–72); East Looe, Cornwall, England
- Resting place: St Martin-by-Looe
- Occupations: Solicitor; topographer; town clerk
- Known for: Topographical and Historical Sketches of the Boroughs of East and West Looe (1823)
- Parent(s): Thomas Bond (JP); Philippa Chubb

Thomas Bond (1765–1837) was a Cornish topographer, born at Looe, Cornwall. He was the son of Thomas Bond, JP, and his wife Philippa (whose father, John Chubb was said to be the first to discover fossils in Cornwall).

== Biography ==
Bond was a solicitor, and had extensive legal knowledge. In 1789 he was appointed town clerk of East Looe, and also (a separate office) town clerk of West Looe, the same year that his father was elected Mayor of East Looe. In 1823, while still in office, he published Topographical and Historical Sketches of the Boroughs of East and West Looe, in the County of Cornwall, with an account of the Natural and Artificial Curiosities and Pictorial Scenery of the Neighbourhood, eight plates and several woodcuts, London, 1823, 8vo, pp. 308. This work, written as a "labour of love", describes seaside places near Plymouth, which were popular resorts in summer for health and recreation. The views of Looe are by his relative, Mrs. Davies Gilbert. He also published in the Journal of the Royal Institution of Cornwall. Bond was a great reader, and his knowledge of the law of tenures was extensive. He died much respected at East Looe 18 Dec. 1837, and, being unmarried, left the greater portion of his property to Davies Gilbert FRS, one of his nearest relatives.

He was buried at St Martin-by-Looe.

== Works ==
- Topographical and Historical Sketches of the Boroughs of East and West Looe
