= Kernick (surname) =

Kernick is a surname of Cornish origin. notable people with this surname include:

- Dudley Kernick (1921–2019), English footballer
- Olivia Kernick (born 2001), Australian rugby league player
- Phyllis Kernick (1924–2009), American politician
- Simon Kernick (born 1967), English writer

== See also ==
- Kernick
