= John Enys (British Army officer) =

Lieutenant Colonel John Enys (17 December 1757 – 30 July 1818) was a British Army officer who served during the American Revolution.

== Family and education ==
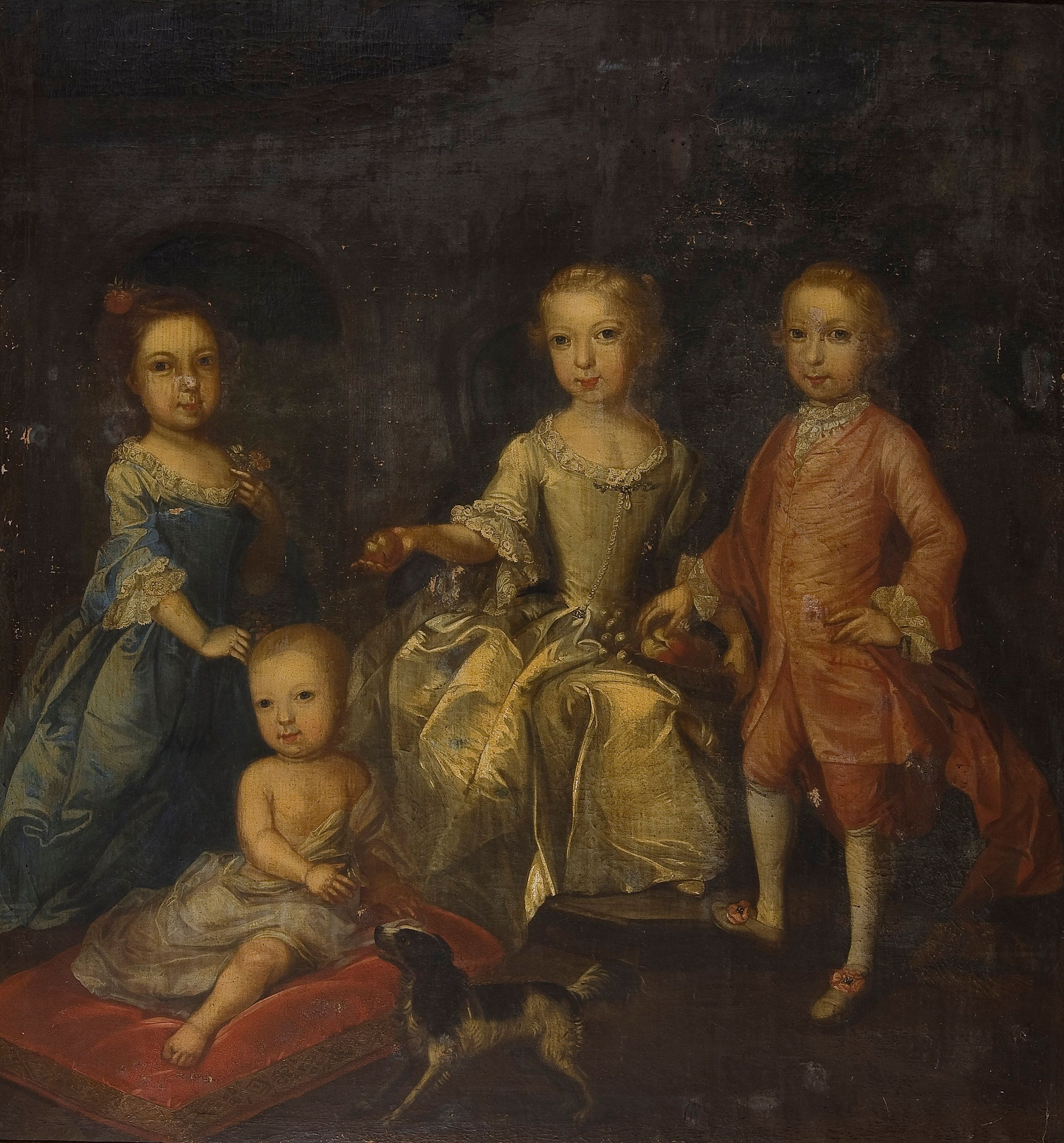
Catherine, Francis, Mary and John Enys with a spaniel, painting by Thomas Hudson

He was born on 17 December 1757, in Cornwall, England, to John Enys and his wife Lucy Basset. John was the youngest of six children and spent much of his childhood at Eton. While at Eton John would contract the deadly illness of small pox but would be one of the lucky ones to recover.

== American Revolution ==
As a younger son of a rich family a military career was chosen for him and his father purchased an Ensign's commission in the 29th Regiment of Foot on 21 April 1775, just as the American Revolutionary War was starting in England's North American colonies.

On 21 March 1776, the 29th, along with John Enys, set sail for Quebec City to relieve the besieged city. Quebec City had been under siege by the Continental Army all winter. Faced with a reinforced British Army the Americans retreated towards Montreal, Quebec. John would see his first action on 8 June 1776 at the Battle of Trois-Rivières in which the Americans were defeated by Gen. Guy Carleton's British Forces.

John was also present with Gen. Carlton's naval squadron on Lake Champlain at the Battle of Valcour Island on 11 October 1776, as Benedict Arnold's American naval squadron was defeated. But the time that it took to prepare and fight the battle had cost the British any chance of further advance that year. John and the rest of the 29th were sent to Montreal for winter quarters.

The campaign of 1777, led by Lt. General John Burgoyne, saw John Enys and the 8 battalion companies of the 29th Regt. left behind in Canada.

With the defeat of Burgoyne's army at Saratoga and loss of the 29th Regiment's light Infantry company in October 1777, John was promoted to Lieutenant on 16 February 1778 and placed into a composite "Ranger" company that took over the duties normally performed by the light infantry company of the regiment.

In the Autumn of 1778, John and his Ranger company took part in a raid down the eastern side of Lake Champlain burning crops, farms and other militarily useful supplies. Known as Carleton's Raid after its overall commander Major Christopher Carleton, also of the 29th Regt., who was the nephew of Guy Carlton.

In 1780, the Ranger company took part in a much larger raid along the western shore of Lake Champlain to Lake George and as far as the Hudson River at Fort Edward. This raid was a part of the Burning of the Valleys that had multiple raids taking place over northern New York and Vermont during the fall of 1780.

== Post Revolutionary War ==
With the American Revolution winding down, John left on leave in July 1782 to visit his family back in Cornwall. While still on leave, John was promoted to the rank of Captain on 25 January 1783, but was soon placed on half-pay as the army cut back it forces with the end of the American Revolution.

John and his brother Francis then spent the summer of 1783 touring Scotland visiting castles, the Antonine Wall and other places of interest.

1784 saw John called back to active service with the 29th Regt. which was still in Canada. Over the next 3 years, John would serve at Montreal, Kingston, Ontario and Fort Niagara. While at the remote outposts of Kingston and Niagara, John found little else to do except for fishing for the abundant trout and salmon in the lakes and streams. In October, the 29th received orders to return to England. John took this time to take another leave and tour the new nation of the United States. John would spend 6 months touring from New England to Virginia before returning to active duty with the Regt. back in England.

== French Revolution and Napoleonic Wars ==
On 1 March 1794, John was promoted to the rank of major for the outstanding recruiting done by the regiment to be at full strength. On 1 June, the 29th served as marines on board the fleet of Admiral Richard Howe in his defeat of a French fleet in the North Atlantic Ocean.

Major Enys was ordered to stay in England to command a large detachment of sick men in February 1795, as the 29th was ordered to the West Indies. As soon as the men were better, they were sent to the Isle of Jersey in the English Channel to guard against French invasion.

With the return of the bulk of the regiment from the West Indies in 1796, John was promoted to the rank of Lt. Colonel of the 29th Regt. on 6 September 1796.

In response to a French landing in Ireland, the 29th and its commander John Enys were sent there with the 100th Regiment of Foot to reinforce those troops already there. Though not engaged in the battle, the 29th did take many French prisoners fleeing from the battle.

Next for Lt. Col. Enys was Holland where a force of British and Russian soldiers under the command of the Duke of York were sent to try and drive the French out of the Netherlands in 1799. Though successful in the small battles that took place, the British and Russian troops soon left with the Netherlands still part of the French Empire.

== Retirement ==
On 20 March 1800, John Enys retired from the active life of a soldier. He was given an expensive inscribed sword from the officers of the 29th Regiment in which he had served for all of his 25 years in the Army. This was not usually the case as officers would often move from regiment to regiment to advance their military career. John never married and after retirement moved to Bath, where he often took the waters to help with his rheumatism and died on 30 July 1818.

In 1976, the journal he kept while in North America was published under the title "The American Journal of Lt. John Enys". In 2010 the National Maritime Museum Cornwall and the Enys family unveiled a birch bark canoe brought back from North America by John Enys. The canoe is to be donated to the Canadian Canoe Museum after being displayed in the main hall of the Museum until September 2011.

== Sources ==
- The American Journals of Lt. John Enys, John Enys and Elizabeth Cometti (editor), Syracuse University Press 1976
- Travels Through the Interior Parts of America 1776–1781 Volumes 1 and 2, Thomas Anurey, Houghton Mifflin Company 1923
- The Worcestershire Regiment: The 29th and 36th Regiments of Foot, Richard Gale, Leo Cooper LTD. 1970
- The Burning of the Valleys, Gavin K. Watt, Dundurn Press 1997
- Carleton's Raid, Ida H. Washington and Paul A. Washington, Cherry Tree Books 1977
- http://www.nmmc.co.uk/index.php?%2Fwhatson%2Fnews%2Fone_of_the_worlds_oldest_birch_bark_canoes_discovered_in_cornwall%2F
