= Penryn Town Hall =

Municipal building in Penryn, Cornwall, England

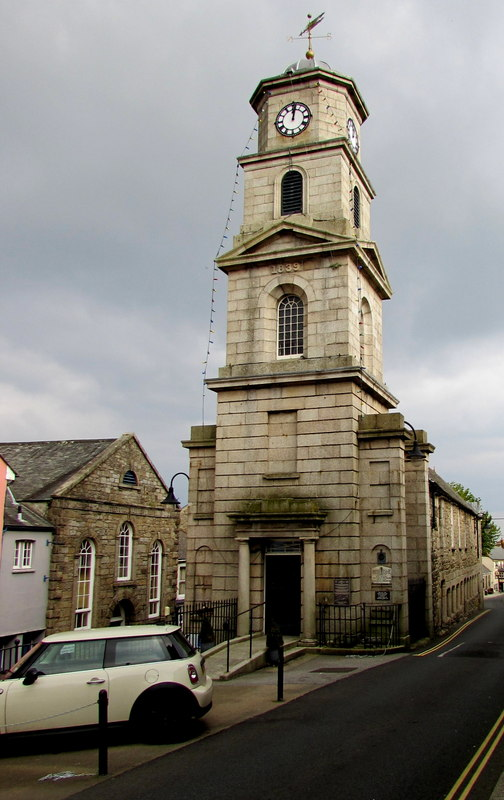
- Penryn Town Hall

- Shown in Cornwall
- 50.1681°N 5.1032°W
- Location: Higher Market Street, Penryn, Cornwall, England

History
- Built: 1839

Site notes
- Architectural style: Neoclassical style

Listed Building – Grade II*
- Official name: The town hall, museum and attached walls and railings
- Designated: 28 January 1949
- Reference no.: 1280314

Penryn Town Hall is a municipal building in Higher Market Street, Penryn, Cornwall, England. The structure, which is used as an events venue and also incorporates a local history museum, is a Grade II* listed building.

== History ==
The town hall was built on the site of the Church of St Mary, a pre-reformation house of worship, which dated back at least to the mid-14th century. The long central section of the town hall, which constitutes the original part of the building, was built using rubble masonry recovered from Glasney College, after it was destroyed during the dissolution of the monasteries. Completed in the 17th century, the design involved a symmetrical main frontage with six bays facing Upper Market Square; it was arcaded on the ground floor so that markets could be held, with an assembly hall on the first floor. The building had a turret clock with chimes, made by Thomas Tompion. A barrel vaulted ceiling was introduced into the assembly room when it became the local civic meeting place in the early 18th century. A lock-up was then established in the building in the early 19th century.

The building was remodelled in the neoclassical style and extended at both ends in 1839. The design for the west end involved a four-stage tower: the first stage featured a porch with Tuscan order columns supporting an entablature and a cornice, the second stage incorporated a blind rectangular window, the third stage, which was pedimented, featured a recessed round headed window, while the fourth stage incorporated louvered openings, and the fifth stage, which was octagonal, featured clock faces (the old clock having been transferred to the new tower). The tower was surmounted by a dome and a weather vane. The design for the east end involved a stuccoed bow front with a Venetian window on the first floor and an entablature and a parapet above.

Following significant population growth, largely associated with the status of Penryn as a market town the area became a municipal borough in 1835. After the arcading had been enclosed with wooden panelling, a museum was established on the ground floor. The museum subsequently acquired various local historical artefacts as well as a fire engine dating from the 1860s.

General election results were typically announced in the town hall and, when the Conservative candidate, Major Sydney Goldman, won the Penryn and Falmouth seat at the January 1910 general election, he was cheered on the steps of the building. The borough council continued to use the town hall as its meeting place for much of the 20th century, although the council officers and their departments were based at offices in Broad Street. The town hall ceased to be the local seat of government after the enlarged Carrick District Council was formed in Truro in 1974. However, it continued to be the meeting place of Penryn Town Council and it also became an approved venue for weddings and civil partnership ceremonies in September 2011.

Works of art in the town hall include a portrait by John Opie of Lieutenant James Rusden of the Royal Navy who died in 1836. There is also a portrait by Edward Arthur Fellowes Prynne of the former mayor, John Bisson, and a portrait by Joseph Sydney Willis Hodges of another former mayor, James Read.

== See also ==
- Grade II* listed buildings in Cornwall (Q–Z)
