= Violetta Thurstan =

English nurse and weaver

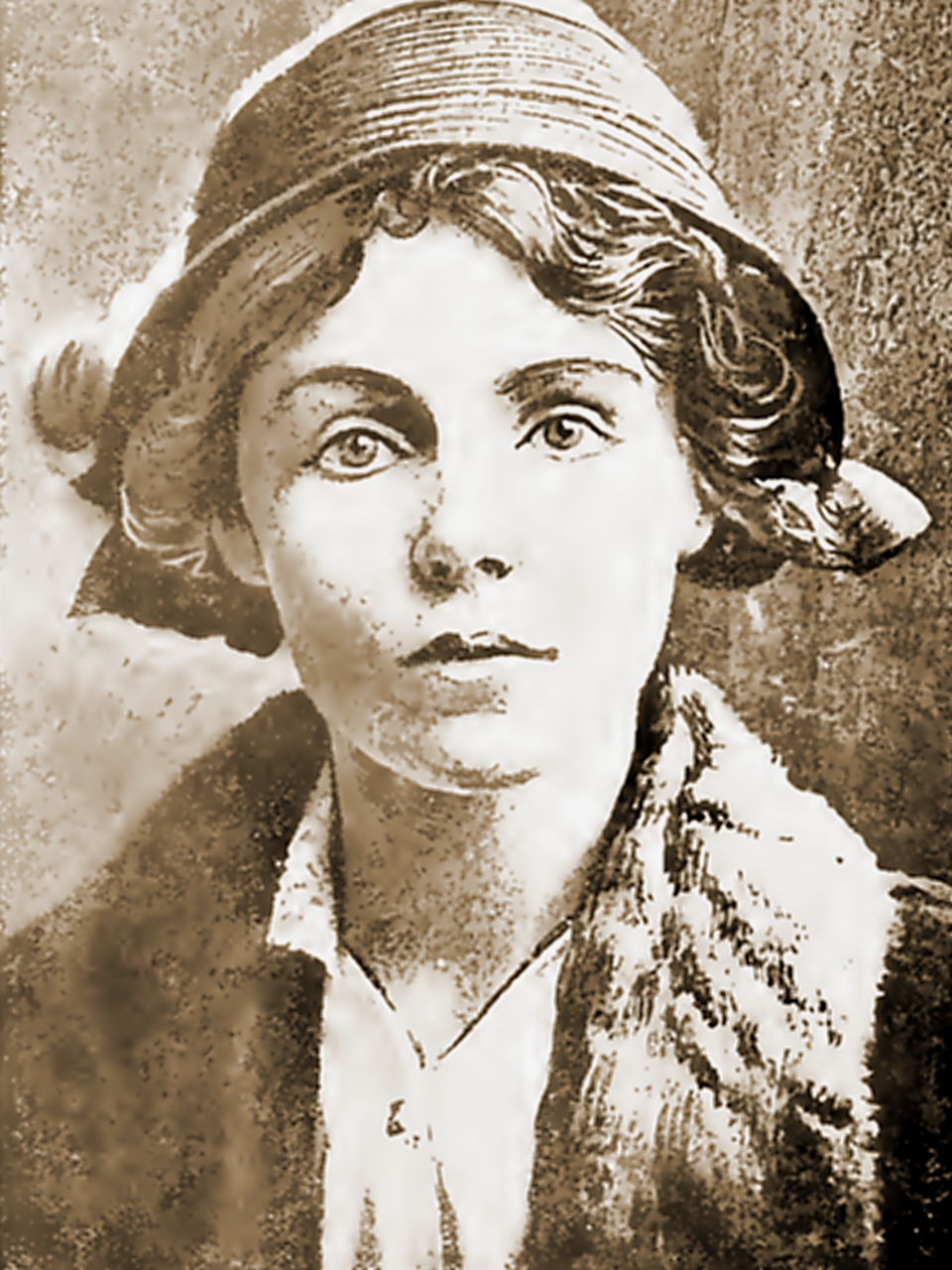
- Violetta Thurstan before 1917
- Born: Anna Violet Thurstan; 4 February 1879; Ore, Sussex, England
- Died: 13 April 1978 (aged 99); Penryn, Cornwall, England
- Occupations: Nurse; Author

Violetta Thurstan, MM (4 February 1879 – 13 April 1978) was an English nurse, author, weaver, and administrator whose work included help for refugees and prisoners of war. She knew several languages, travelled frequently and wrote a number of books. The first was about her experiences of nursing in dangerous troublespots during the First World War. She was honoured by three countries for her courage while nursing in the war, and was awarded the Military Medal.

== Early life ==
Anna Violet Thurstan was born on 4 February 1879 in Ore, Sussex. She was the eldest child of Anna (née Reid) and Edward Paget Thurstan, a doctor, and had three younger brothers. The family moved often and the teenage "Vi", who would later call herself Violetta, went to boarding schools including a German Catholic school and the Ladies' College, Guernsey. She started nursing in the UK in 1897 and trained at the London Hospital, Whitechapel under matron Eva Luckes between 1900 and 1903. From 1905 to 1907 she was Home Sister at the Bristol Royal Infirmary. Until 1913, Thurtsan worked in a number of institutions, including a convalescent home in Hythe, a Surgical hospital in Spain and a children's home in Duxhurst. In 1910 she was appointed as Superintendent of West Riding Nursing Association, and West Riding Midwifery Training School, Yorkshire where she remained until 1913. She simultaneously built on her language skills and studying history and geography. This led to an external degree from the University of St Andrews: an LLA in modern languages and fine art.

== First World War ==
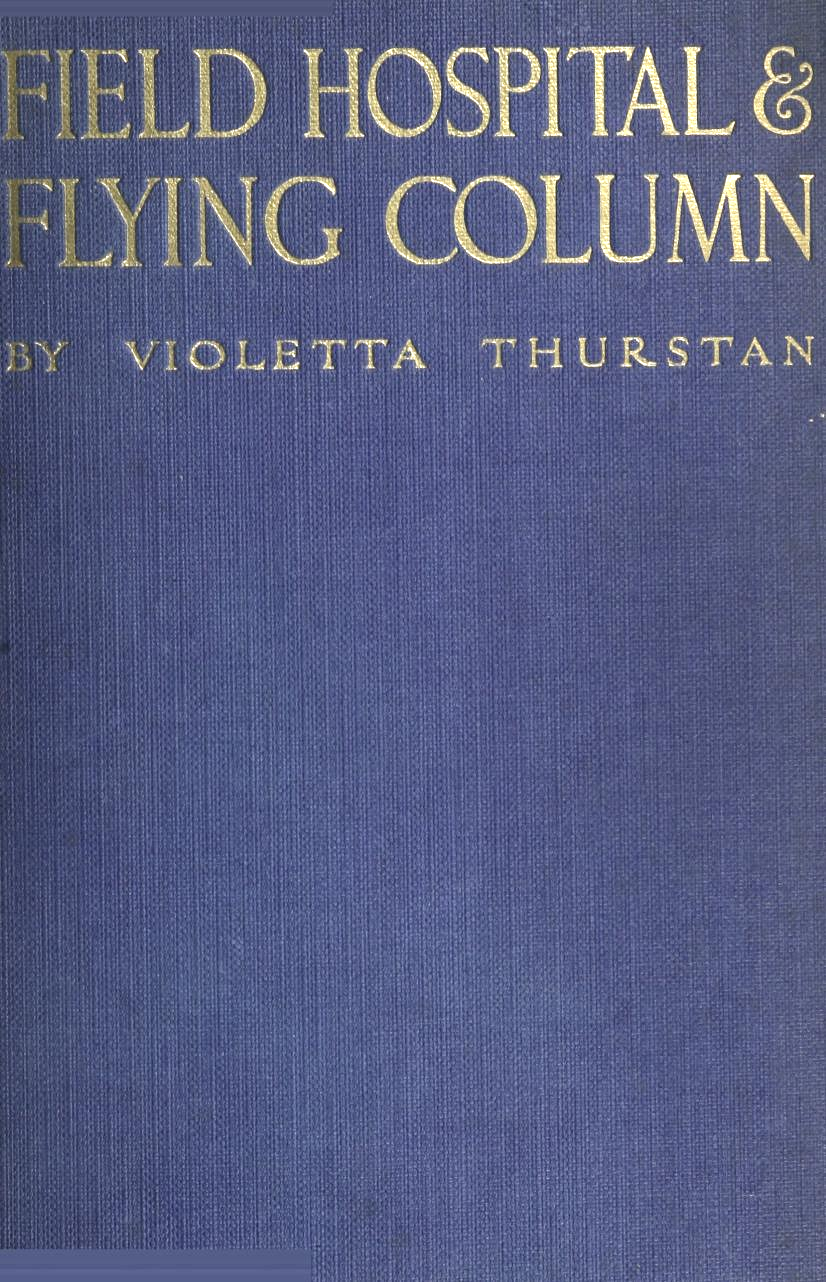
Cover of her first book, 1915

Thurstan joined the British Red Cross in 1913. From February 1913 she was Matron of the Civil Hospital, Spezia in Italy. In August 1914, with the start of the First World War, she was Matron, of the British Red Cross Society Hospital, Marceline, Brussels, Belgium. Soon the occupying German army ordered all British nurses to leave and forced her to go to Copenhagen under armed escort. From there she travelled north through Sweden and Finland to reach Russia, where she joined the flying column, or mobile medical unit, headed by Prince and Princess Peter Volkonsky. Thurstan was Nurse-Driver, Flying Field Ambulance Service, Russian Red Cross, until March 1915. As part of this unit she tended to the wounded in Łódź after it was bombarded, and then nursed in and around Warsaw. She was wounded with shrapnel, and also became ill with pleurisy.

Unable to work, she wrote her first book, Field Hospital and Flying Column, which described the previous few months of her life. This book ran to a second edition in London and New York and was translated into French. During her convalescence in England Thurstan gave lectures in various cities about her experiences. In her book she argued that properly trained nurses were essential for nursing work and pressed the case for state registration of qualified nurses. For some years she was organising secretary for the National Union of Trained Nurses (NUTN). Thurstan was also a member of the Matrons’ Council of Britain.

By the end of 1915 she was back in Russia as a representative of the NUTN offering support for refugees on the Eastern front. This was described in The People who Run: the Tragedy of the Refugees in Russia: a "vivid account" of the situation for about five million "haggard" people, by Thurstan's estimate. Late in 1916 she was made matron of a hospital in De Panne, close to the Belgian front line, and shortly after that was posted even nearer the front to manage a dressing station in Koksijde. Her efforts in evacuating wounded soldiers from Koksijde under fire earned her the Military Medal. She also received the Russian Cross of St George (4th class), the Belgian Queen Elisabeth Medal, the Serbian Order of St Sava, the 1914 Star and other awards.

The evacuation left her with delayed concussion and she needed another period of convalescence in the UK. She published A text book of war nursing in 1917. Her last posting of the war was as matron to Ostrovo field hospital in Macedonia near the Salonika front between 1917 and 1918. Malaria put an end to her time there. On recovery she was appointed to the Women's Royal Air Force as an administrator serving until September 1919.

In 1978, she wrote another book about this period of her life, The Hounds of War Unleashed, which does not match all the details of Field Hospital, and may contain fictional elements. One academic suggests that her wartime books are influenced by her "romantic vision" of life. It has also been said that some information about Thurstan's earlier life is unclear and confusing.

== Textiles and Bedouin refugee camps ==
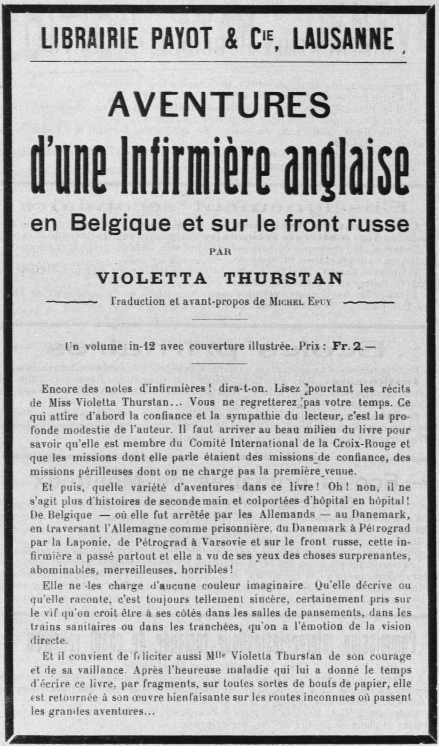
1915 publisher's advertising for French edition of Field Hospital or "Adventures of an English Nurse"

After a spell as an administrator with the Women's Royal Air Force, Thurstan took diploma courses in weaving, dyeing and other textile arts in Sweden, Italy, France and Germany. Around 1923 she was appointed Director of Bedouin Industries in the refugee camps in the Libyan desert, under the Egyptian Frontier Districts Administration run by the British. Here she oversaw Bedouin women making carpets. She was responsible for purchasing supplies and on one of her trips to buy wool she was, according to a newspaper report, the first European woman to spend the night ashore in a Red Sea port. The same newspaper said no European woman had ever been as far into the desert as she had. She had many opportunities to travel in the region, and across Europe when going home on leave. During this time she was a fellow of the Royal Geographical Society and was later made an honorary fellow.

She wrote on dyes for the Egyptian Horticultural Review and in 1930 published Use of Vegetable Dyes for Beginners, which sold well in four editions, and is still a well-regarded text. She was back in the UK when her A Short History of Decorative Textiles and Tapestries came out in 1934, as well as Weaving Patterns of Yesterday & Today, also in the 1930s. These were followed in 1956 by Weaving Without Tears. A silk cot cover which Thurstan designed and wove in 1935 is in the collection of the Victoria and Albert Museum.

== Spanish Civil War and Second World War ==
In 1937 she went to help in the Spanish Civil War, as part of Sir George Young's Universities Ambulance Service, and worked to have prisoners in Almería released.

When the Second World War came she was commissioned in the Women's Royal Naval Service after claiming to be less than fifty years old. Her language skills were deployed in Naval Intelligence, where she boarded ships in searches for contraband. Afterwards she took part in the 1945 post-war Catholic Relief Programme. (She had converted from Anglicanism to Catholicism not long after the First World War.) She worked with displaced people and prisoners of war in Italy, Egypt and Austria, and helped evacuate and resettle children. She then did similar work with the Allied Commission in Austria in 1946–1948. She was made a companion of the Vatican by Pope Pius XII.

== Later life ==
In her seventies she went to live in Cornwall where she wove, taught crafts and wrote. She published two novels: the first of them a biographical novel, Stormy Petrel, in 1964 and The Foolish Virgin, inspired by her post-war aid work, in 1966. Thurstan went on travelling, leading a pilgrimage of Cornish women to Rome in 1958, and going to Greece in 1966 as a crafts adviser. She continued to be involved in textile arts within the UK and attended a World Crafts Council meeting in London in 1967. She also advised on a dye garden at Probus Gardens in Truro in 1976. In 1973 she was involved in setting up the Cornwall Crafts Association and at the age of 94 she was made a Fellow of the Society of Designer Craftsmen. She died at home in Penryn on 13 April 1978 at the age of 99.
