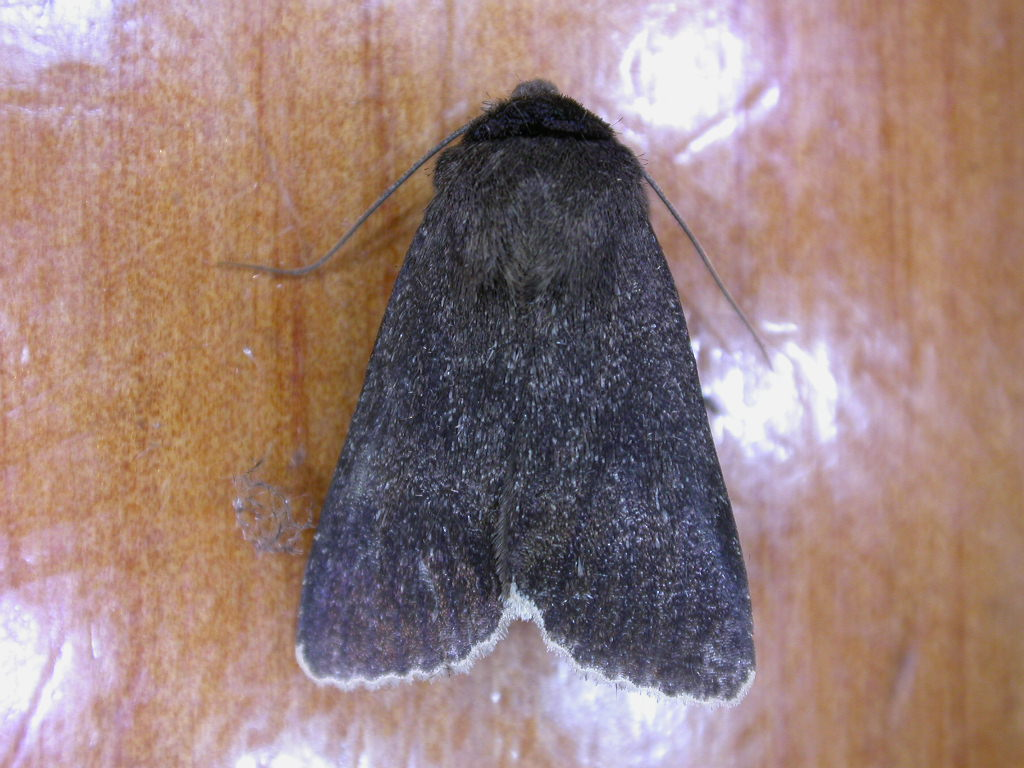
- Bityla sericea

Scientific classification
- Domain: Eukaryota
- Kingdom: Animalia
- Phylum: Arthropoda
- Class: Insecta
- Order: Lepidoptera
- Superfamily: Noctuoidea
- Family: Noctuidae
- Subfamily: Hadeninae
- Genus: Bityla; Butler, 1877

= Bityla =

Genus of moths

Bityla is a genus of moths of the family Noctuidae.

== Selected species ==
- Bityla defigurata Butler, 1865
- Bityla sericea Butler, 1877
