= Edward Dunsterville =

British naval officer (1796–1873)

- Born: 2 December 1796; Penryn, Cornwall
- Died: 11 March 1873 (aged 76); London, England
- Military career
- Allegiance: Great Britain; United Kingdom
- Branch: Royal Navy
- Service years: 1796–1815, 1824–1870
- Rank: Commander
- Conflicts: French Revolutionary Wars; Napoleonic Wars; Egyptian–Ottoman War

Commander Edward Dunsterville (1796–1873) was a naval officer and hydrographer.

== Life ==
Dunsterville, son of Edward Dunsterville, shipowner, was born at Penryn in Cornwall on 2 December 1796. He entered the navy on 17 July 1812 as a first-class volunteer on board the sloop Brisk. On the north coast of Spain he was present in the night attack made in August 1813 on the fortress of San Sebastian, and became a midshipman on 26 September 1813.

As a midshipman and an able seaman he served until 18 November 1815, when on the reduction of the fleet to a peace establishment he was 'finally discharged' from His Majesty's service. Afterwards he was employed as second and chief officer in the merchant service. However, on 9 September 1824 he passed an examination at the Trinity House for a master in the navy, and was appointed second master of Valorous. As master of the Bustard he was stationed in the West Indies, where he made many useful observations, which were duly recorded at the admiralty; afterwards in England he passed examinations and received certificates of his practical knowledge as a pilot.

On 25 March 1833, on the nomination of the hydrographer of the admiralty, he became master of the surveying vessel Thunderer, with orders to complete the survey of the Mosquito coast, and remained in that employment until 27 November 1835, when he was invalided from the effects of his servitude of fifteen years on the West India station. As a lieutenant on board the Cambridge, he took part in the operations of 1840 on the coast of Syria, and assisted in blockading the Egyptian fleet at Alexandria, and was awarded the Syrian medals.

On 19 April 1842 he became one of the hydrographer's assistants at the admiralty, Whitehall, where he remained until 31 March 1870, when he was superannuated at the age of 73, on two-thirds of his salary, namely, £400 per annum. During the twenty-eight years of his residence at the admiralty he had to attend to the issuing of charts to the fleet, to keep an account of the printing, mounting, and issue of charts and books, to report to the hydrographer on questions of pilotage, and to prepare catalogues of charts and the annual lighthouse lists. Of the latter he revised and saw through the press 102 volumes respecting the lights and lighthouses in all parts of the world. Between 1860 and 1877 he produced the Admiralty Catalogue of Charts, Plans, Views, and Sailing Directions. He also brought out The Indian Directory, or Directory for Sailing to and from the East Indies. By James Horsburgh, F.R.S. Corrected and revised by Commander E. Dunsterville,’ 7th ed. London, 1859, 2 vols., and 8th ed. 1864, 2 vols.

He died at 32 St. Augustine's Road, Camden Square, London, 11 March 1873. He was twice married and left children.
