= John Samuel Enys =

British engineer (1796–1872)

- Born: 21 September 1796; England
- Died: 29 May 1872 (aged 75)
- Education: Winchester College, Exeter College, Oxford
- Known for: Improvements to steam engines in Cornish mines

John Samuel Enys (21 September 1796 – 29 May 1872) was a British mining engineer and scientist who wrote several important papers on the "duty" (coal intake) of steam engines and other types of power delivery, from water wheels to horses. He also made numerous studies on the extensive mining industry in Cornwall. On the death of his great-uncle, Francis Enys in 1821 he inherited the Enys Estate, near Penryn, Cornwall and was appointed High Sheriff of Cornwall in 1824.

== Personal life ==
Enys was born on 21 September 1796, the son of Samuel Hunt and Luce Ann, the daughter of Samuel Enys. His father died in 1813, and his mother reverted her name to Enys. Enys was educated at Winchester College, matriculated at Exeter College, Oxford, and took an honorary third in classics. In 1821 his great-uncle, Francis Enys, died, and he inherited the family's land. He did not appear to take an interest in farming, but rather became active in local politics and took a position as a magistrate as High Sheriff of Cornwall in 1824. On 17 April 1834 he married Catherine Gilbert, the daughter of Mary Ann Gilbert and Davies Gilbert, and together they had five children, including John Enys. His father-in-law, Davies was President of the Royal Society at the time, and although Enys was not a member himself, his family connections opened Enys to the Society in a less formal way. He joined The Institution of Civil Engineers as an Associate on 12 March 1839.

== Career ==
The steam engine was just becoming widely used in Cornwall, after the introduction of the Watt steam engine, and Enys spent considerable effort studying and improving the models used nearby. In the process he wrote several seminal papers on the comparative performance of the engines, notably Remarks on the Duty of the Steam Engines employed in the Mines of Cornwall at different Periods. His works appeared in the Transactions of the Institution of Civil Engineers, the Transactions of the Royal Cornwall Polytechnic Society, the Reports of the British Association and others. He was voted a member of the Royal Geological Society of Cornwall in 1827.

With Henry de la Beche, Enys took up the topic of geology and mineralogy, which led to an interest in architecture. During a trip to Italy he became interested in boats, and subsequently published several papers on improved buoys, reefing and hull shapes.

== See also ==
- Enys family of Enys in Cornwall
