= Christopher Carleton =

British Army officer (1749–1787)

Lieutenant-Colonel Christopher Carleton (1749 – 14 June 1787) was a British Army officer who served in the American War of Independence. Born into an Ulster military family in Newcastle-upon-Tyne, Carleton's parents died at sea when he was only four years old. His uncles, Guy and Thomas Carleton, saw to his education and upbringing. At the age of 12, Carleton was commissioned into the British army's 31st Regiment of Foot at the rank of ensign. Prior to his first tour of duty in North America, he married Anne Howard, whose sister Maria was the wife of Guy. While in North America, Carleton met Sir William Johnson and lived among the Mohawk people, learning their language and partaking in their customs. Carleton would later remark that the time he spent living with the Mohawks was the happiest of his life. These skills would serve him well later.

Carleton was back in England when the American War of Independence broke out in 1775. In May 1776, Carleton, then at the rank of captain, arrived at Quebec City as part of a relief force for Guy, whose forces were under attack by the Continental Army. During the campaign leading up to the Battle of Valcour Island, Carleton served on Guy's staff and in command of detachments of Native American allies. In 1777, Carleton purchased a major's commission in the 29th Regiment of Foot, in which Thomas was a lieutenant colonel.

In the autumn of 1778, Carleton led a raid along the shores of Lake Champlain, burning Patriot-controlled towns along Otter Creek in Vermont and taking several American militiamen prisoner. The raid was very successful, destroying enough supplies to provision 12,000 men for a four-month campaign. Carleton also showed that he was an expert in leading Native warriors along with British regulars and Loyalist troops, a feat that not many British officers could claim. His time spent with the Mohawks in his youth had paid off.

During the Burning of the Valleys in 1780, Carleton lead another raid up Lake Champlain into the upper Hudson Valley, capturing the forts at Fort Ann and Fort George with a mixed force of British, Loyalist and Hessian troops and Native warriors, including the 29th's unique ranger company under John Enys. The years spent on the cold northern frontiers of North America took its toll on Carleton's health, and he died on 14 June 1787 at Quebec City.

== Sources ==
- The American Journals of Lt. John Enys, John Enys and Elizabeth Cometti (editor), Syracuse University Press 1976
- The Burning of the Valleys, Gavin K. Watt, Dundurn Press 1997
- Carleton's Raid, Ida H. Washington and Paul A. Washington, Cherry Tree Books 1977
- Letters of Brunswick and Hessian Officers During The American Revolution, William Stone, translator. ©1891, Joel Munsell's Sons, Albany, NY.
