= John Davies Gilbert =

John Davies Gilbert (5 December 1811 – 16 April 1854) was a land owner, born in Eastbourne the son of Davies Gilbert and Mary Ann Gilbert.

John Davies Gilbert and his son, Carew Davies Gilbert played a major role, as landowners, in the development of the town of Eastbourne and also developed Trelissick Garden in Feock, Cornwall.

In 1834 he was elected FRS as his father had been. but does not seem to have published any scientific papers. He was elected High Sheriff of Sussex for 1840.

He died in Padstow. He had married the Hon. Anne Dorothea Carew, daughter of Sir Robert Shapland Carew, 1st Baron Carew.

== See also ==
- Davies-Gilbert family

Honorary titles
Preceded by Thomas Frewen	High Sheriff of Sussex; 1840	Succeeded by Sir Richard Hunter
