= The Burning of the Valleys (1780) =

The Burning of the Valleys was a significant four-pronged attack on the northern frontiers of New York and Vermont during the American Revolutionary War. In October of 1780, British Regular, Loyalist, and Haudenosaunee forces simultaneously invaded the Mohawk, Schoharie, and upper Hudson River Valleys of New York, and the White River Valley of Vermont. The scorched-earth campaign was designed to make the patriot settlers abandon the territory and move the Canadian border south to include the abandoned regions. Forces commanded by Major Christopher Carleton captured and destroyed both Fort Anne and Fort George on October 10 and 11th, respectively. Forces under Captain John Munro attacked Ballston on October 12 - 13. Forces under Lieutenant Richard Houghton attacked Royalton, Vermont on October 16. Finally, on October 17 and October 18, forces under Sir John Johnson, Col. John Butler, Joseph Brant, Sayenqueraghta, and Cornplanter destroyed the Schoharie and lower Mohawk Valleys; the following day they destroyed Stone Arabia and the campaign culminated at Klock's Field, after which the attack column withdrew to Canada.

== Overview ==
Expeditionary Forces
| Commander | Total - All Ranks | Notes |
|---|---|---|
| Lt.Col. Sir John Johnson | 943 | 265 Haudenosaunee, 206 Butler's Rangers, 287 KRRNY, 160 British Regulars, 25 Hessians |
| Maj. Christopher Carleton | 776 | 484 British Regulars, 150 Loyalists, 108 Kahnawake & Kanehsatake, 34 Hessian Jaegers |
| Capt. John Munro | 195 | 131 KRRNY, 34 Fraser's Rangers, 30 Claus' Rangers |
| Lt. Richard Houghton | 200 | About 200 warriors of the Kahnawake & Kanehsatake |
| Total | 2,114 | |

== Timeline ==
- Sept. 20, 1780 - Sir John Johnson arrives at Oswego from Montreal
- Sept. 27 - Forces of Major Carleton, Captain Munro, and Lieutenant Houghton assemble at Fort Saint-Jean and subsequently embark.
- Oct. 2 - Johnson departs Oswego for Schoharie with Butler, Brant, Cornplanter & Sayenqueraghta.
- Oct. 6 - Carleton and Munro reach Bullwagga Bay on Lake Champlain. Munro departs, Carleton continues to South Bay.
- Oct. 10 - Carleton captures Fort Anne.
- Oct. 11 - Carleton captures Fort George, both forts burned along with settlements between. Munro arrives at the Sacandaga River.
- Oct. 12 - Carleton departs.
- Oct. 13 - Houghton on Onion River
- Oct. 16 - Houghton attacks Royalton, VT; Munro reaches Ballston & begins attack
- Oct. 17 - Ballston decimated by Munro, departs for Sacandaga River; Sir John Johnson's column attacks the Schoharie Valley
- Oct. 18 - Sir John's forces attack the lower Mohawk
- Oct. 19 - Sir John's forces destroy Stone Arabia & fight against General Van Rensselaer's forces at the Battle of Klock's Field, party withdraws at dark.
- Oct. 21 - Houghton returns to Saint-Jean
- Oct. 24 - Munro and Carleton rendezvous at Bullwagga Bay, embark for Canada
- Oct. 26 - Sir John Johnson's column departs Oswego for Canada

== Aftermath ==
Nearly all crops in the affected areas were destroyed just prior to harvest along with all stores of grain and food, houses, barns, livestock, etc. This magnitude of destruction made these settlements uninhabitable. Schenectady nearly became the limit of the frontier, if not for a few scattered forts in the Mohawk Valley. A report made in December 1780 stated "that 700 buildings have been burnt, 354 families have abandoned their plantations and moved from the county, 613 persons have deserted to the enemy, 197 persons have been killed, 121 persons are prisoners with the enemy. The number of uncultivated farms in consequence of incursions by and desertions to the enemy amounts to at least 1,200. The whole of the county is not included in the above. Returns from Cherry Valley, Newtown-Martin, Springfield, Harpersfield and Old England district, by reason of a total desertion of these settlements could not be got. The inhabitants have some deserted to the enemy, the greater number moved on." Much of Tryon County remained abandoned until after the war. This raid also marked the last time Sir John Johnson set foot in the Mohawk Valley.

Tally of Destruction
| Commander | Place Attacked | Houses Burned | Barns Burned | Mills Burned | Deaths Inflicted | Prisoners Taken |
|---|---|---|---|---|---|---|
| Lt. Col. Sir John Johnson | Mohawk and Schoharie Valleys, New York | 174 | 177 | 4 | 100 | ? |
| Maj. Christopher Carleton | Upper Hudson Valley, Lake George, NY | 38 | 33 | 7 | 27 | 130 |
| Capt. John Munroe | Ballston, New York | 19 | 19 | 1 | 2 | 30 |
| Lt. Richard Houghton | Royalton, Vermont | 21 | 20 | 2 | 4 | 26 |
| Totals | | 252 | 249 | 14 | 133 | 186+ |

== See also ==
- The Capitulation of Fort Ann
- Fort George and the Battle of Bloody Pond
- Raid on Ballston
- Royalton Raid
- Battle of Stone Arabia
- Battle of Klock's Field
