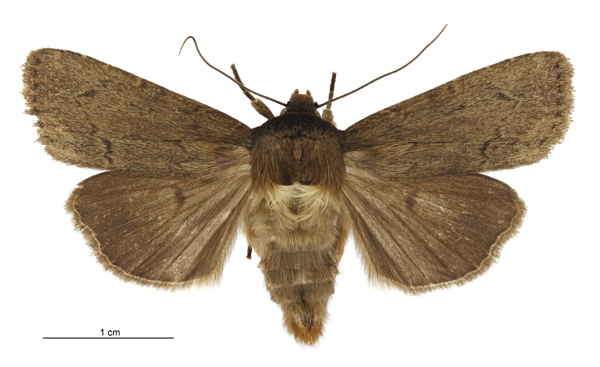
- Female
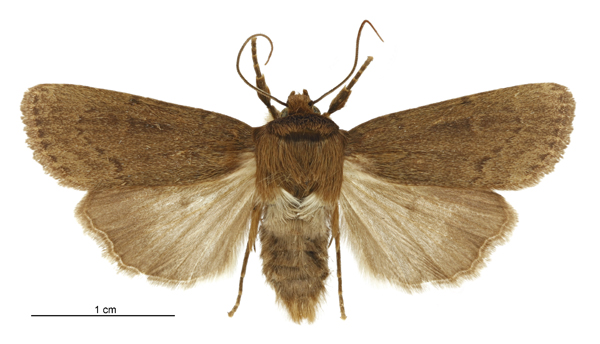
- Male

Scientific classification
- Kingdom: Animalia
- Phylum: Arthropoda
- Clade: Pancrustacea
- Class: Insecta
- Order: Lepidoptera
- Superfamily: Noctuoidea
- Family: Noctuidae
- Genus: Bityla
- Species: B. defigurata

Binomial name
- Bityla defigurata (Walker, 1865)

Synonyms
- Xylina defigurata Walker, 1865; Bityla thoracica Walker, 1865

= Bityla defigurata =

Species of moth

Bityla defigurata is a moth of the family Noctuidae. It is endemic to New Zealand.

== Taxonomy ==
This species was first described by Francis Walker in 1865 using specimens collected by T. R. Oxley in Nelson and originally named Xylina defigurata. Edward Meyrick placed this species in the genus Bityla and synonymised Bityla thoracica with this species. The female holotype is held at the Natural History Museum, London.

== Description ==
Walker described this species as follows:

Female. Cinereous-brown. Head and fore tegulae of the thorax dark brown. Palpi dull ochraceous, fringed beneath, obliquely ascending, rising a little higher than the vertex; second joint mostly black on the outer side; third elongate-conical, about one-third of the length of the second. Abdomen brownish-cinereous, extending rather beyond, the hind wings; apical tuft ochraceous. Wings shining, tinged with aeneous. Fore wings with some indistinct brown lines composed of lunules; orbicular and reniform marks indistinctly brown-bordered. Hind wings a little more cinereous than the fore wings. Length of the body 10 lines; of the wings 22 lines.

== Distribution ==
It is endemic to New Zealand and found in both the North and South Islands.

== Behaviour ==
The adults of this species are on the wing from January to March and is attracted to light. They have been collected via a mercury vapour light trap.

== Host species ==
The larvae of this species have been reared on Muehlenbeckia australis and Muehlenbeckia complexa.
