= Kernick =

Area of Penryn in Cornwall, England

Coordinates: 50.164°N 5.113°W

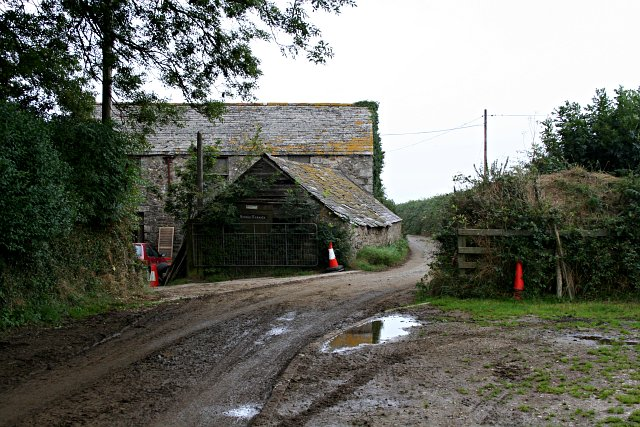
Higher Kernick Farm

Kernick (Cornish: Karnek, meaning rocky place) is a settlement in west Cornwall, England, UK. It is a part of the town of Penryn, now a suburb of Falmouth. The name Kernick is a derivative of Cernic / Carnak meaning 'rocky' in Cornish, like Carnac in Brittany/

Kernick is located near Mabe, a village on the edge of a new urban area. Kernick has thrived as an industrial area since the late 1970s with two industrial parks, and one large industrial estate, with about 100 factories. An Asda supermarket was recently constructed nearby, which has taken much business from the small town shops. Kernick is also thriving as a suburban housing area, with three housing estates in the vicinity, two of which (Littleoaks and Woodland Avenue) have in excess of 200 houses each. There is also another housing estate nearby, and a large area called Greenwood, which has in excess of 500 houses and bungalows. Kernick is also the site of the new Combined Universities in Cornwall (CUC).

There is also a place called Kernick in St Stephen in Brannel parish; the meaning here is "little corner" which also applies to Kernock, also in Cornwall.
