= HMS Maria =

A number of ships of the Royal Navy have carried the name Maria, including:

- HMS Maria (1776) a schooner served on Lake Champlain in 1776. She was at the battle of Valcour Island in 1776 though she did not participate in the action. Her subsequent disposition is currently obscure.
- HMS Maria (1805), a French schooner privateer captured in 1805 that foundered in 1807
- HMS Maria (1807), a gun-brig scuttled in 1808
- HMS Maria (1941), a wreck dispersal vessel, formerly the German weather ship August Wriedt
