= Penryn, Cornwall =

Town in Cornwall, England

Coordinates: 50.169°N 5.107°W

Penryn: Cornish: Pennrynn
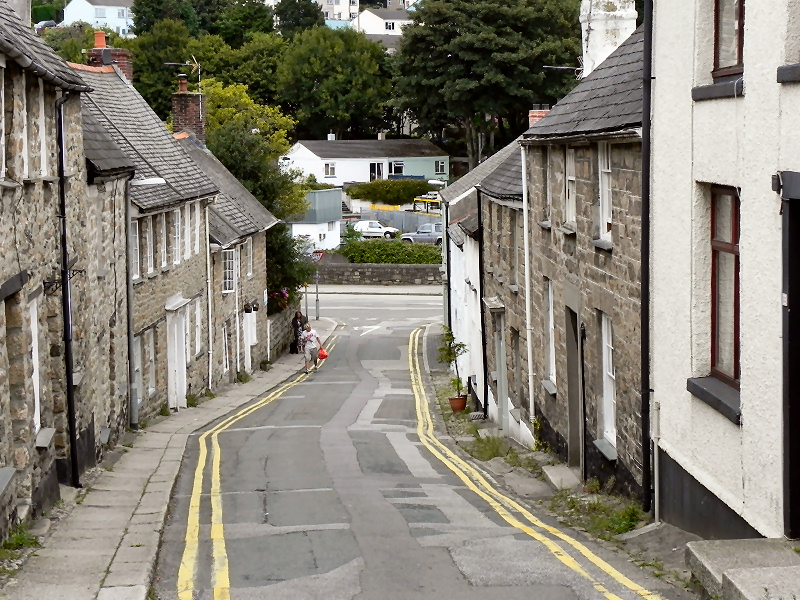
- St Gluvias Street, Penryn

- Location within Cornwall
- Population: 8,489 (Parish, 2021); 11,195 (Built up area, 2021)
- OS grid reference: SW782345
- Civil parish: Penryn
- Unitary authority: Cornwall Council
- Ceremonial county: Cornwall
- Region: South West
- Country: England
- Sovereign state: United Kingdom
- Post town: PENRYN
- Postcode district: TR10
- Dialling code: 01326
- Police: Devon and Cornwall
- Fire: Cornwall
- Ambulance: South Western
- UK Parliament: Truro and Falmouth

Penryn (/pɛnˈrɪn/; Cornish: Pennrynn [ˈpɛnːrɪnː], meaning 'promontory') is a civil parish and town in west Cornwall, England, United Kingdom. It is on the Penryn River about 1 mile (1.6 km) northwest of Falmouth. At the 2021 census the parish had a population of 8,489 and the built up area as defined by the Office for National Statistics (which extends beyond the parish boundary) had a population of 11,195.

Though now the town is overshadowed by the larger nearby town of Falmouth, Penryn was once an important harbour in its own right, lading granite and tin to be shipped to other parts of the country and world during the medieval period.

== History ==
=== Early history ===
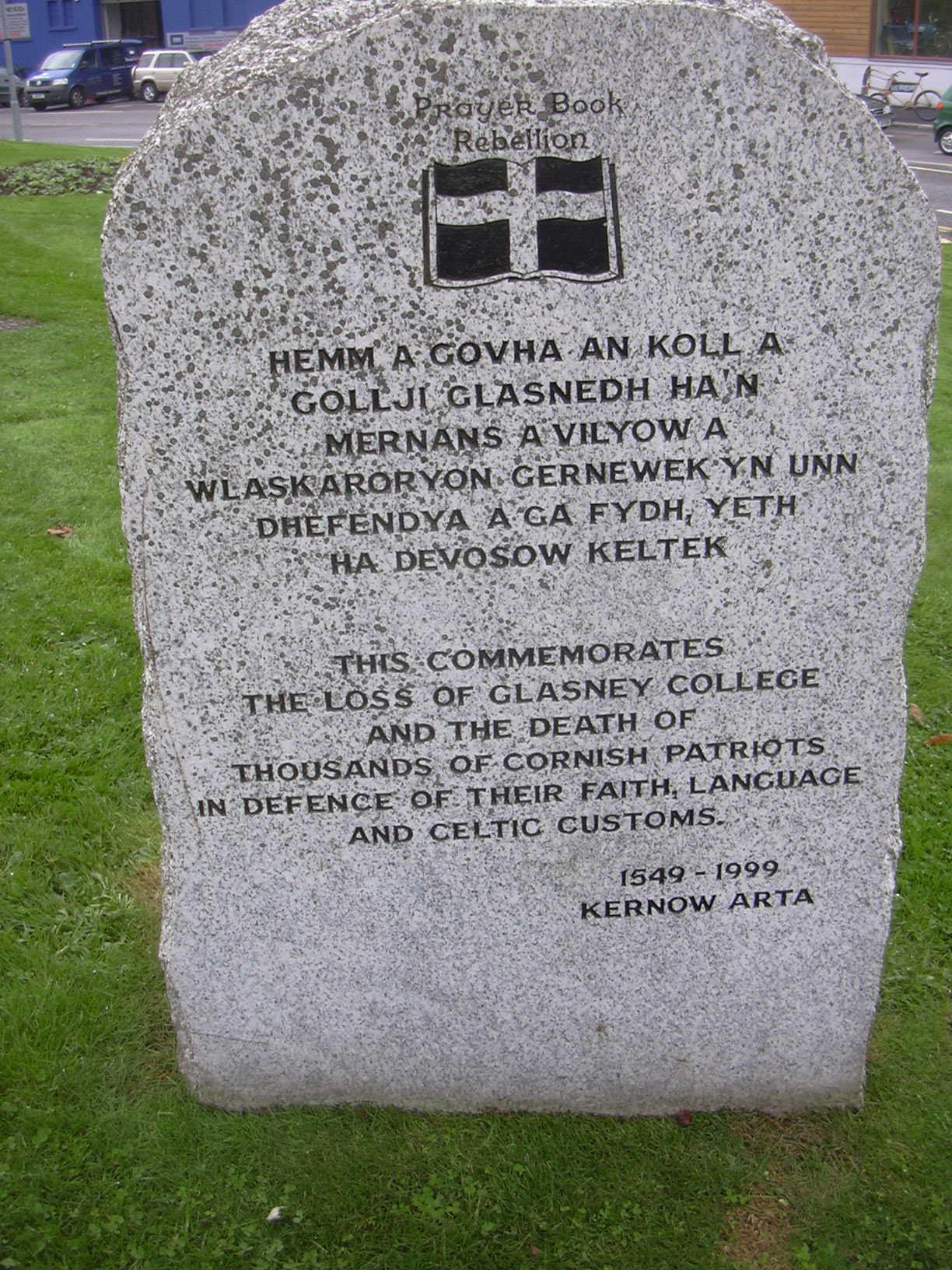
Prayer Book Rebellion Memorial, near the site of Glasney College

The ancient town first appears in the Domesday Book under the name of "Trelivel", and was since founded and named Penryn in 1216 by the Bishop of Exeter. The borough was enfranchised and its Charter of Incorporation was made in 1236. The contents of this Charter were embodied in a confirmation by Bishop Walter Bronescombe in the year 1259. In 1265, a religious college, called Glasney College, was built in Penryn for the Bishop of Exeter to develop the church's influence in the far west of the diocese. In 1374, the chapel of St Thomas (sometimes called St Mary's) was opened. Standing at the head of the Penryn River, Penryn occupies a sheltered position and was a port of some significance in the 15th century. After the Dissolution of the Monasteries by King Henry VIII and the disestablishing of the Roman Catholic church, Glasney College was dissolved and demolished in 1548 during the brief reign of Edward VI, the first Protestant Duke of Cornwall and afterwards King of England. The dissolution of Glasney College helped trigger the Prayer Book Rebellion of 1549.

=== Later history ===
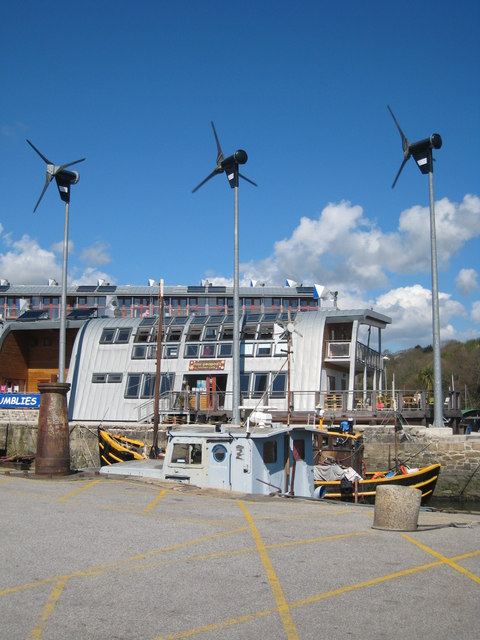
Jubilee Wharf

From 1554, Penryn held a parliamentary constituency, which became Penryn and Falmouth in 1832. The constituency was abolished in 1950, Penryn becoming part of the Falmouth and Camborne constituency. It received a royal charter as a borough in 1621, mainly in a bid by the crown to cure the town of piracy. At least three mayors of Penryn were convicted of piracy between 1550 and 1650. The arms of the borough of Penryn were a Saracen's head Or in a bordure of eight bezants. The merchant traveller and writer Peter Mundy (c.1600–67) was the son of a Penryn pilchard trader and travelled extensively throughout his life in Asia (where he was one of the first Europeans to taste tea), Russia and Europe before returning to Penryn to write his Itinerarium Mundi ('World Itinerary'); one of the earliest travel guides in English.

By the mid-17th century, the port was thriving from trade in Cornish fish, tin and copper. However, Penryn lost its custom house and market rights to the new town of Falmouth as a direct result of supporting the Parliamentary side in the English Civil War (1642–48).

In the early 19th century, granite works were established by the river and large quantities of the stone were shipped from its quays for construction projects both within the UK and abroad.

The population was 3,337 in 1841.

The A39 road, which begins in Bath and is about 200 miles (320 km) long, once passed through Penryn towards the end of its route in nearby Falmouth, but in 1994 was diverted around the town when the Penryn Bypass was opened, incorporating a stretch of new road along with upgrading to an existing road.

The town is the setting of the play The Penryn Tragedy, which tells of a young man unwittingly murdered by his parents after disguising himself as a rich stranger.

== Today ==
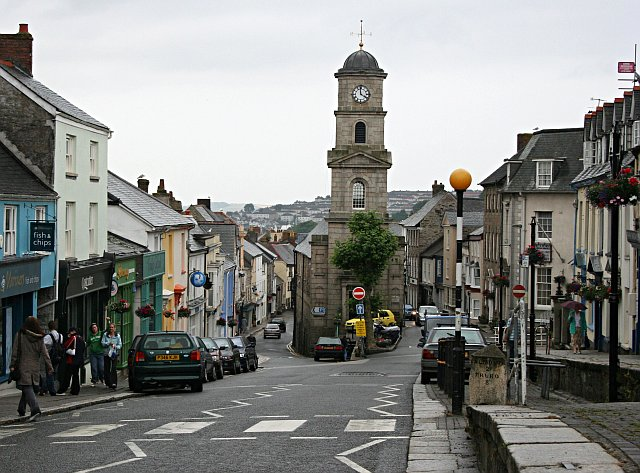
Market Street, looking south

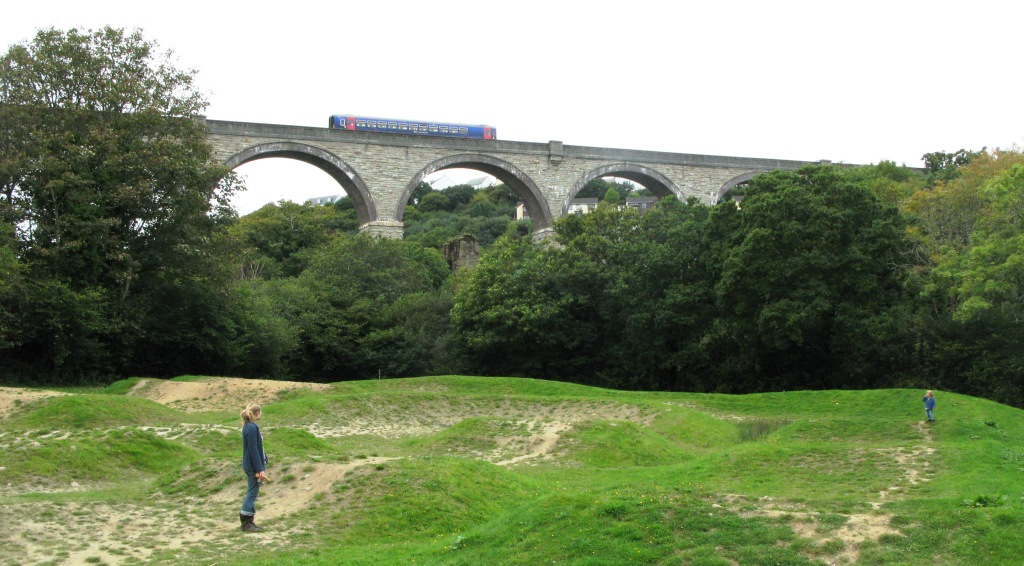
Collegewood railway viaduct

Today, Penryn is a quiet town and has retained a large amount of its heritage. A large proportion of its buildings date from Tudor, Jacobean and Georgian times; the town has therefore been designated as an important conservation area. The local museum is housed in Penryn Town Hall. The town hall building is partly 17th century and partly 19th century in date; its clock tower is dated 1839.

Penryn has seen some redevelopment in the early 21st century, with the construction of mixed-use development Jubilee Wharf in 2007, and the renovation of former storage unit Jubilee Warehouse as a workspace. In 2022, a public consultation was held at The Fish Factory on a proposed regeneration scheme for Commercial Road. The scheme aims to prioritise pedestrian traffic, through widened pavements and development of new public space.

== Governance ==
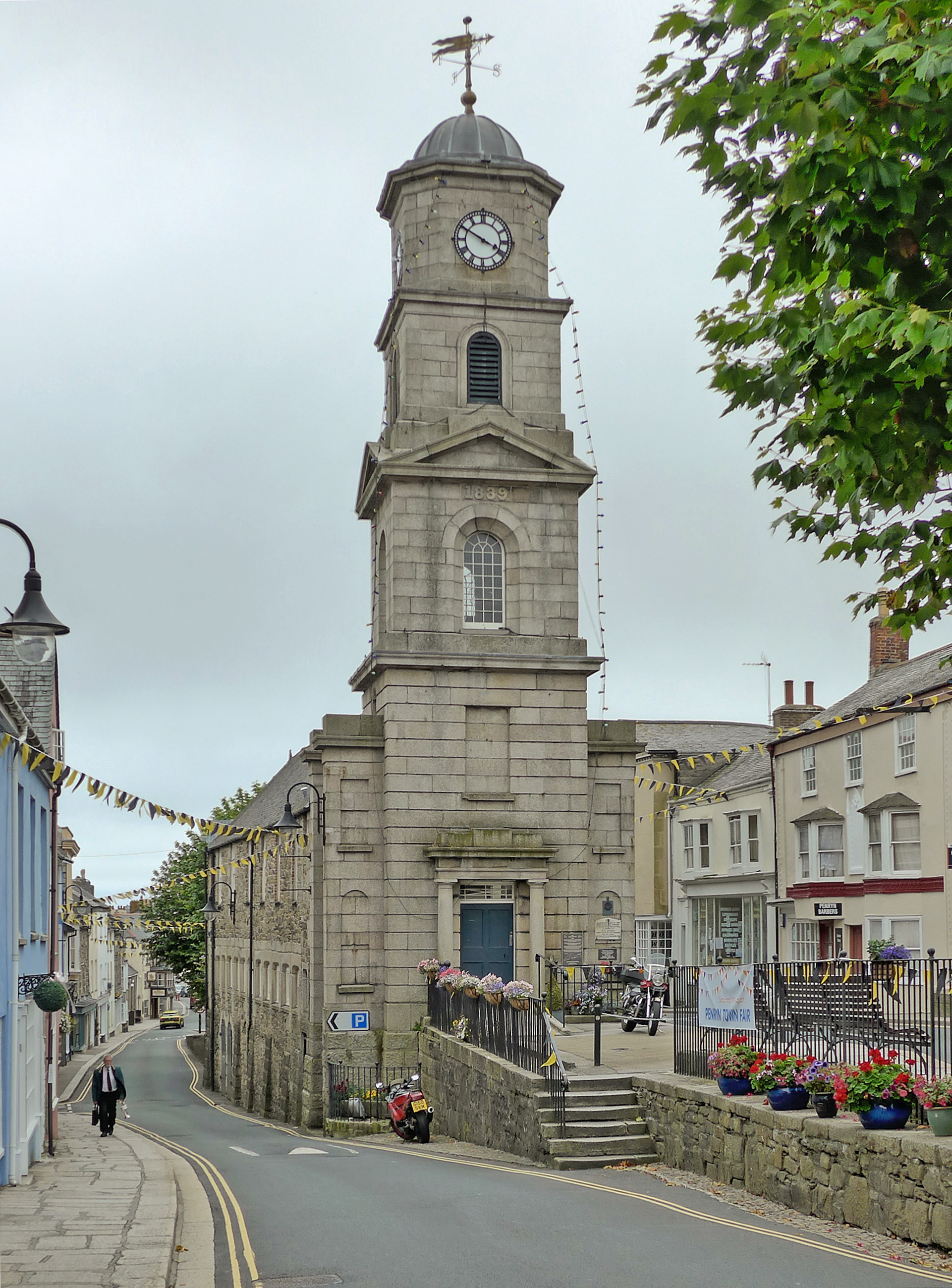
Penryn Town Hall

There are two tiers of local government covering Penryn, at parish (town) and unitary authority level: Penryn Town Council and Cornwall Council. The town council meets at Penryn Town Hall and has its offices at Penryn Library in St Thomas Street.

=== Administrative history ===
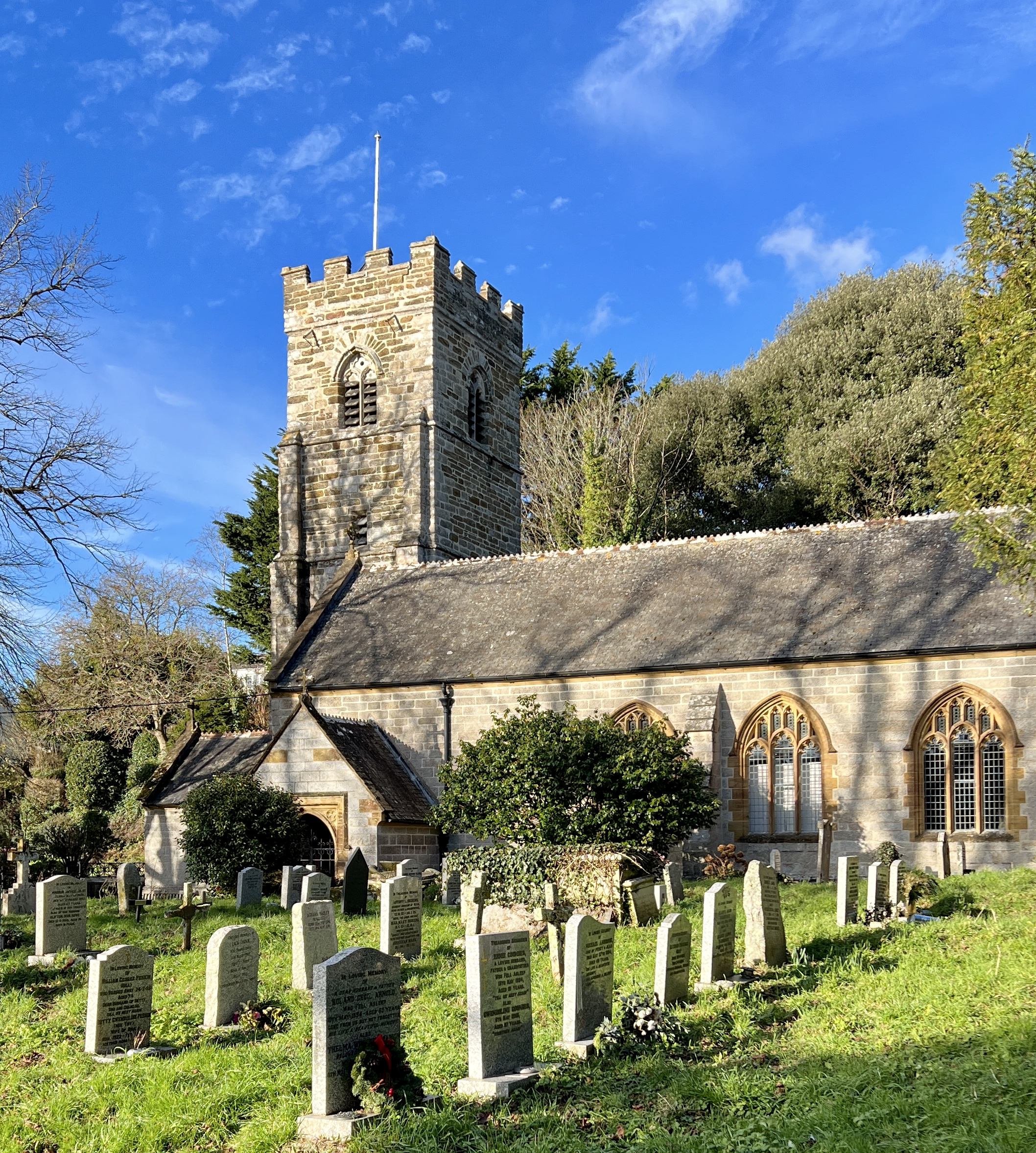
Parish church of St Gluvias

Penryn historically formed part of the ancient parish of St Gluvias in the Kerrier Hundred of Cornwall. The parish church, parts of which date back to the 15th century, stands about 0.25 miles (400 m) north of the centre of Penryn, separated from the main part of the town by one of the arms of the Penryn River. The parish of St Gluvias covered an extensive area; as well as Penryn it also included Ponsanooth and surrounding rural areas. In the 16th century the neighbouring parish of Budock (which covered Falmouth) was downgraded to be a chapelry of St Gluvias for ecclesiastical purposes, although Budock continued to be treated as a separate parish for civil purposes. Falmouth was made a separate parish in 1664, and the rest of Budock regained its ecclesiastical independence from St Gluvias in 1890.

Penryn was made a borough in 1236 by William Briwere, the Bishop of Exeter. It was a lower status seigneurial borough, remaining subordinate to the bishops of Exeter in their capacity as lords of the manor. From 1547 the town also formed the Penryn parliamentary borough (constituency).

The borough was formally incorporated in 1621, giving it greater powers of self-government. Penryn was reformed to become a municipal borough in 1836 under the Municipal Corporations Act 1835, which standardised how most boroughs operated across the country.

Penryn remained part of the parish of St Gluvias until 1866. From the 17th century onwards, parishes were gradually given various civil functions under the poor laws, in addition to their original ecclesiastical functions. In some cases, including St Gluvias, the civil functions were exercised by subdivisions of the parish rather than the parish as a whole. Poor law functions were administered separately for Penryn and the rest of St Gluvias parish. In 1866, the legal definition of 'parish' was changed to be the areas used for administering the poor laws, and so Penryn became a separate civil parish from St Gluvias.

The borough was enlarged in 1934 to take in areas from the neighbouring parishes of Budock, Mabe and St Gluvias. The part of St Gluvias absorbed into the borough included the parish church of St Gluvias and the adjoining settlement of the same name, which by then had effectively become a suburb of Penryn. Despite no longer including the namesake church or settlement, a reduced civil parish of St Gluvias continued to exist after 1934, covering the remaining northern parts of the old parish that had not been absorbed into Penryn. The St Gluvias civil parish was renamed Ponsanooth in 2021.

The borough of Penryn was abolished in 1974 under the Local Government Act 1972, when the area became part of the Carrick district. A successor parish called Penryn was created at the same time, covering the area of the abolished borough. As part of the 1974 reforms, parish councils were given the right to declare their parishes to be a town, allowing them to take the title of town council and giving the title of mayor to the council's chairperson. The new parish council for Penryn exercised this right, taking the name Penryn Town Council.

Carrick district was abolished in 2009. Cornwall County Council then took on district-level functions, making it a unitary authority, and was renamed Cornwall Council.

== Education ==
=== Higher education ===
In 2004, the Penryn Campus was completed, creating the hub of the Combined Universities in Cornwall (CUC) project. It includes the University of Exeter housing the 6th best Ecology Department in the world and Camborne School of Mines, which has moved from Camborne, where it has been for over a century, among other departments of the University of Exeter. The Campus also houses departments of Falmouth University, which is based in the centre of Falmouth. In 2007, phase two was completed, which includes increased student accommodation and new teaching areas.

=== Schools ===
There are currently two schools in Penryn:

- Penryn Primary Academy (a merging of Penryn Infants and Junior Schools)
- Penryn College

== Transport ==
Penryn railway station was opened by the Cornwall Railway on 24 August 1863. It is towards the northwest end of the town and is served by regular trains from Truro to Falmouth on the Maritime Line. There are several bus routes that connect the town to Falmouth, Helston and Penzance.

== Twinning ==
Penryn has been twinned with the commune of Audierne in Brittany, France since 1 January 1973.

The relationship remains strong still, with Penryn welcoming and hosting guests from Audierne as recent as 2012 and 2014.

In 2023, a memorial stone was erected in Penryn to celebrate 50 years of twinning with Audierne.

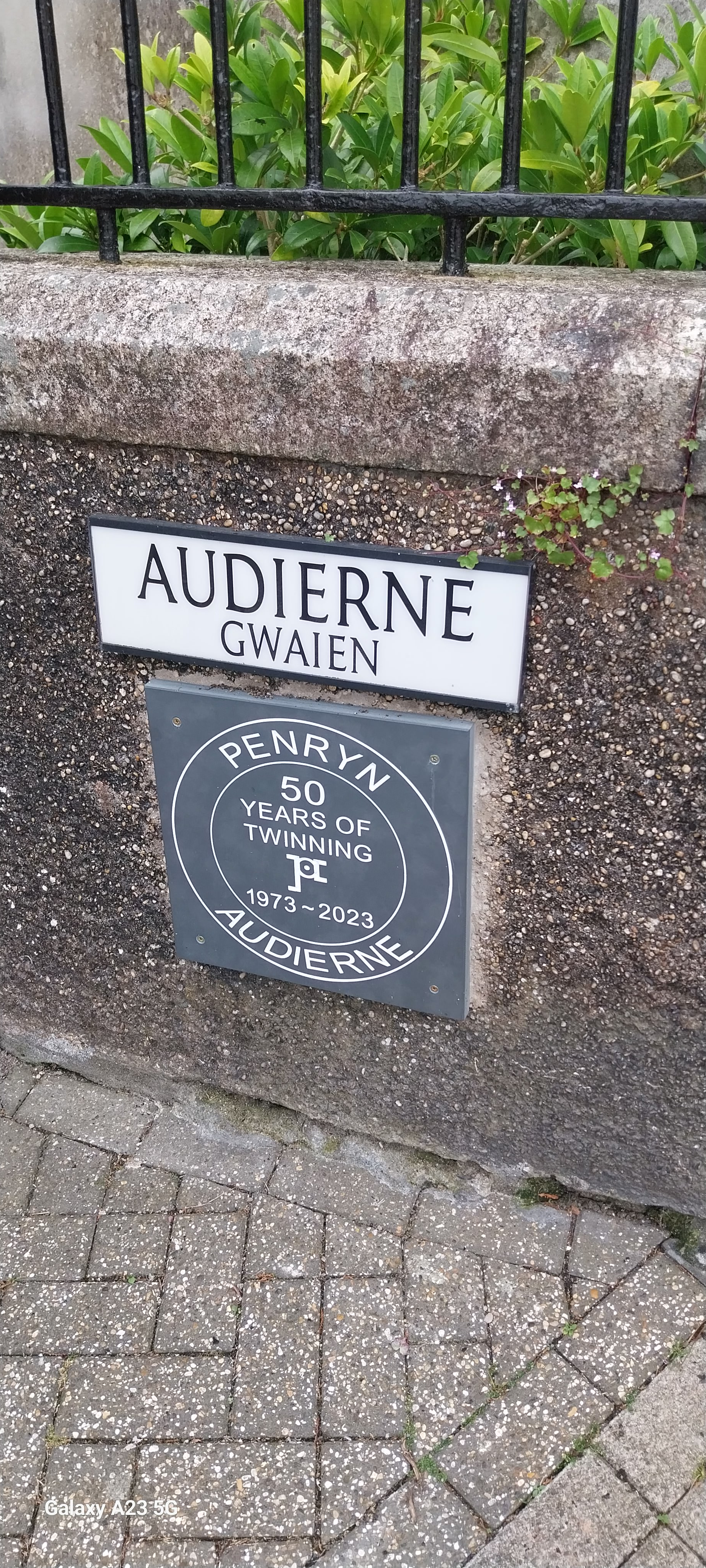
This memorial stone in Penryn commemorates 50 years of twinning with Audierne.

== Media ==
Local TV coverage is provided by BBC South West and ITV West Country. Television signals are received from the Redruth and local relay TV transmitters.

Local radio stations are BBC Radio Cornwall on 103.9 FM, Heart West on 107.0 FM, and Source FM, a community based station which broadcast to the town on 96.1 FM.

The town is served by the local newspaper, Falmouth Packet.

== Sport and leisure ==
Penryn RFC, founded in 1872, is a rugby union club which plays in the Tribute Western Counties West league, the seventh tier of the English rugby union league system. They are nicknamed "The Borough" and are the oldest rugby club in Cornwall.

Penryn Athletic (founded 1963; also known as "The Borough") is a non-League football club who play at the 1,500-capacity Kernick Road ground. The club is a member of the South West Peninsula League Division One West, which is a step 7 league in the national league system.

In 2021, Penryn-based Cornwall R.L.F.C. joined the third tier of professional Rugby league, RFL League 1.

The English Shinty Association is based in Penryn.

=== Cornish wrestling ===
Penryn hosted Cornish wrestling tournaments over the centuries. Places where tournaments were held include the Bowling Green, Parkengue and the Glasney playing field.

== Policing ==
The policing of the area is the responsibility of Devon and Cornwall Police who have a dedicated team to cover the area known as the Penryn & Mylor Local Policing Team.

== Notable residents ==
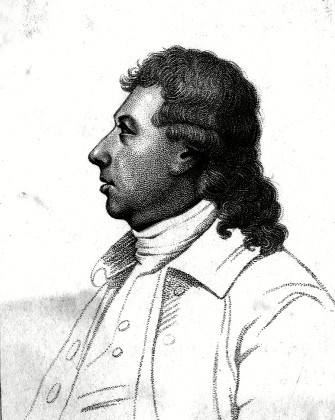
Jonathan Hornblower

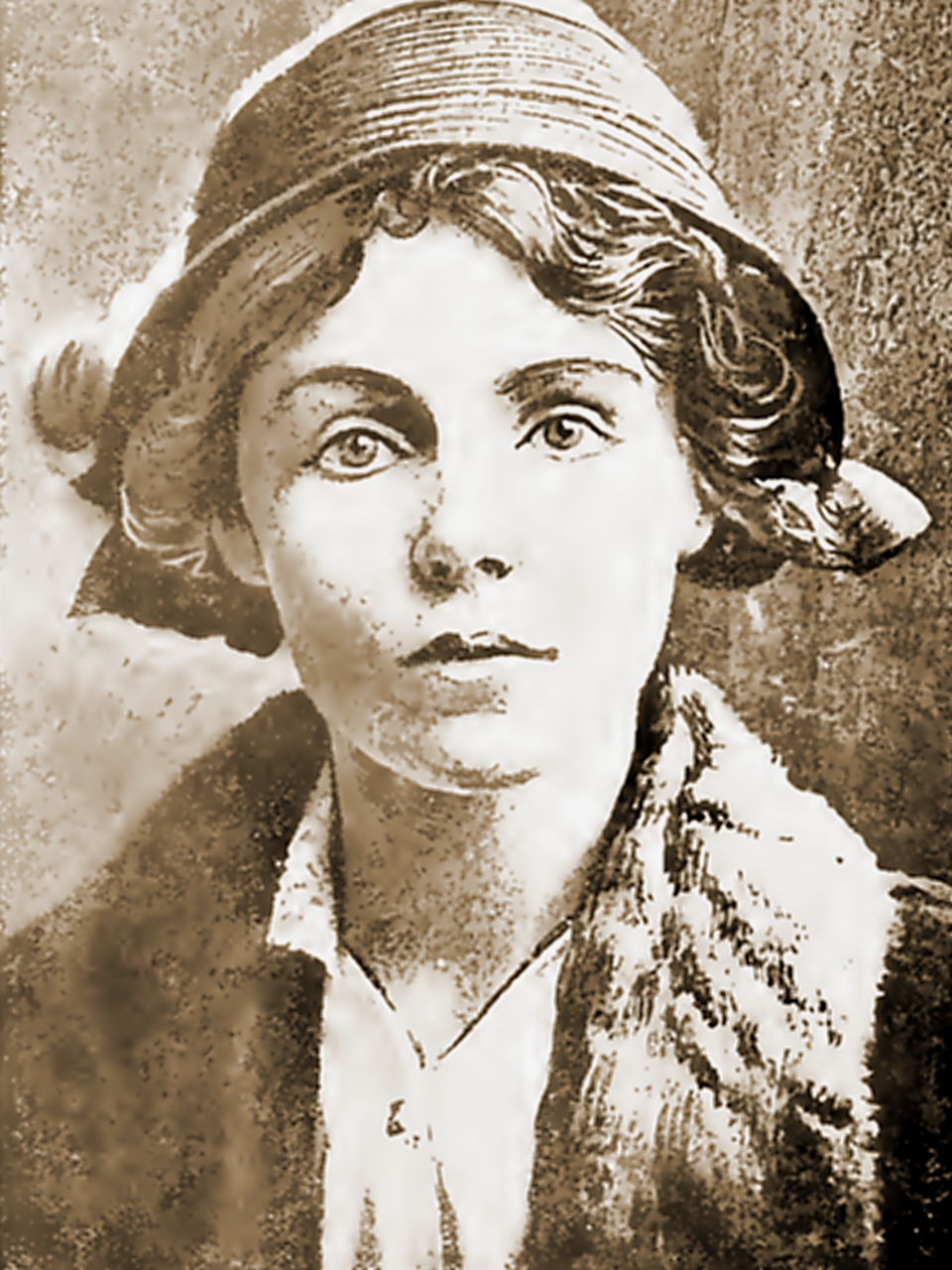
Violetta Thurstan, 1917

- Sir John Killigrew (died 1584), the second Governor of Pendennis Castle (1568–1584) and twice MP for Penryn
- Peter Mundy (1597-1667), factor, merchant trader, traveller and writer.
- Samuel Enys (1611–1697), an English merchant, politician and MP for Penryn
- John Coode (c. 1648 – 1709), Reverend, Colonel, Captain, revolutionary, and Governor of Maryland 1689–1691
- William Worth (1677−1742), a classical scholar and divine.
- Thomas Pellow (1704–1745), author and former slave.
- Cyrus Redding (1785–1870), a British journalist and wine writer.
- Jonathan Hornblower (1753–1815), English pioneer of steam power, died locally.
- Pascoe Grenfell (1761–1838), businessman, politician and MP for Penryn.
- Vice-Admiral Shuldham Peard (1761–1832), officer of the Royal Navy.
- John Tucker Williams (1789–1854), Canadian soldier and politician
- John Samuel Enys (1796–1872), mining engineer and scientist, he inherited the Enys Estate in 1821
- Commander Edward Dunsterville (1796–1873), a naval officer and hydrographer.
- William Harris Rule (1802–1890), Methodist missionary.
- William Upton Richards (1811–1873), an English Anglican priest.
- Emma Hosken (1845–1884), novelist
- Paymaster Rear-Admiral Sir Hamnet Share (1864–1937) a Royal Navy paymaster officer.
- Violetta Thurstan (1879–1978), World War I nurse, died locally aged 99
- Vic Roberts (1924–2004), British Lion and England rugby union player who played 16 games for England played for Penryn RFC.
- Ellen Hunter (born 1968), a Welsh competitive cyclist and tandem pilot in Paralympic events, lives locally

== See also ==
- Kernick
