= British Regulars =

British Army soldier of the 18th and 19th centuries

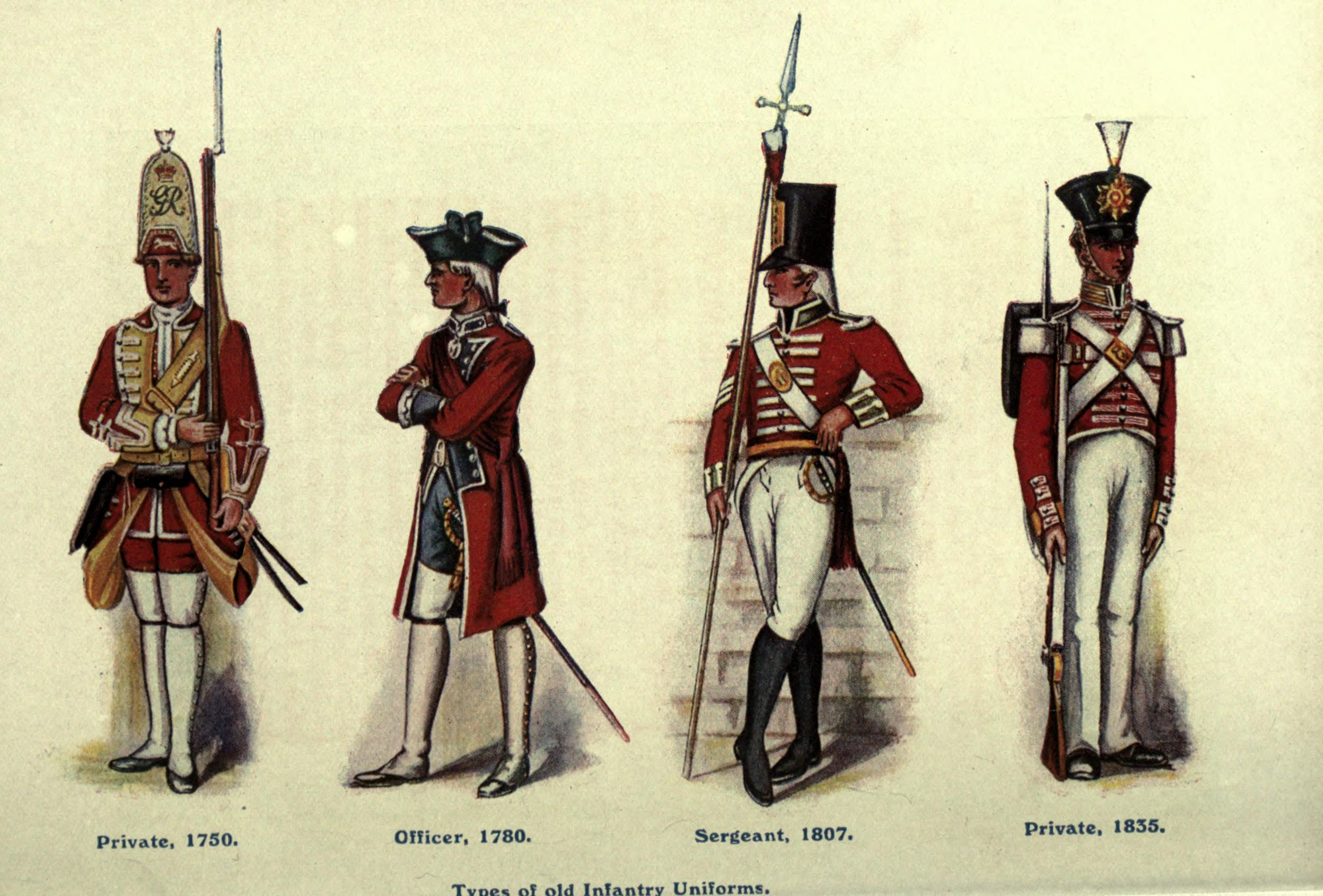
Infantry uniforms of the British Army from 1750 to 1835

British regulars is a term commonly used to describe the eighteenth-century British foot soldiers who were known for their distinct red uniform and well-disciplined combat performance. These soldiers were members of the regular army, as compared to irregular military such as private armies or mercenaries.

== History ==
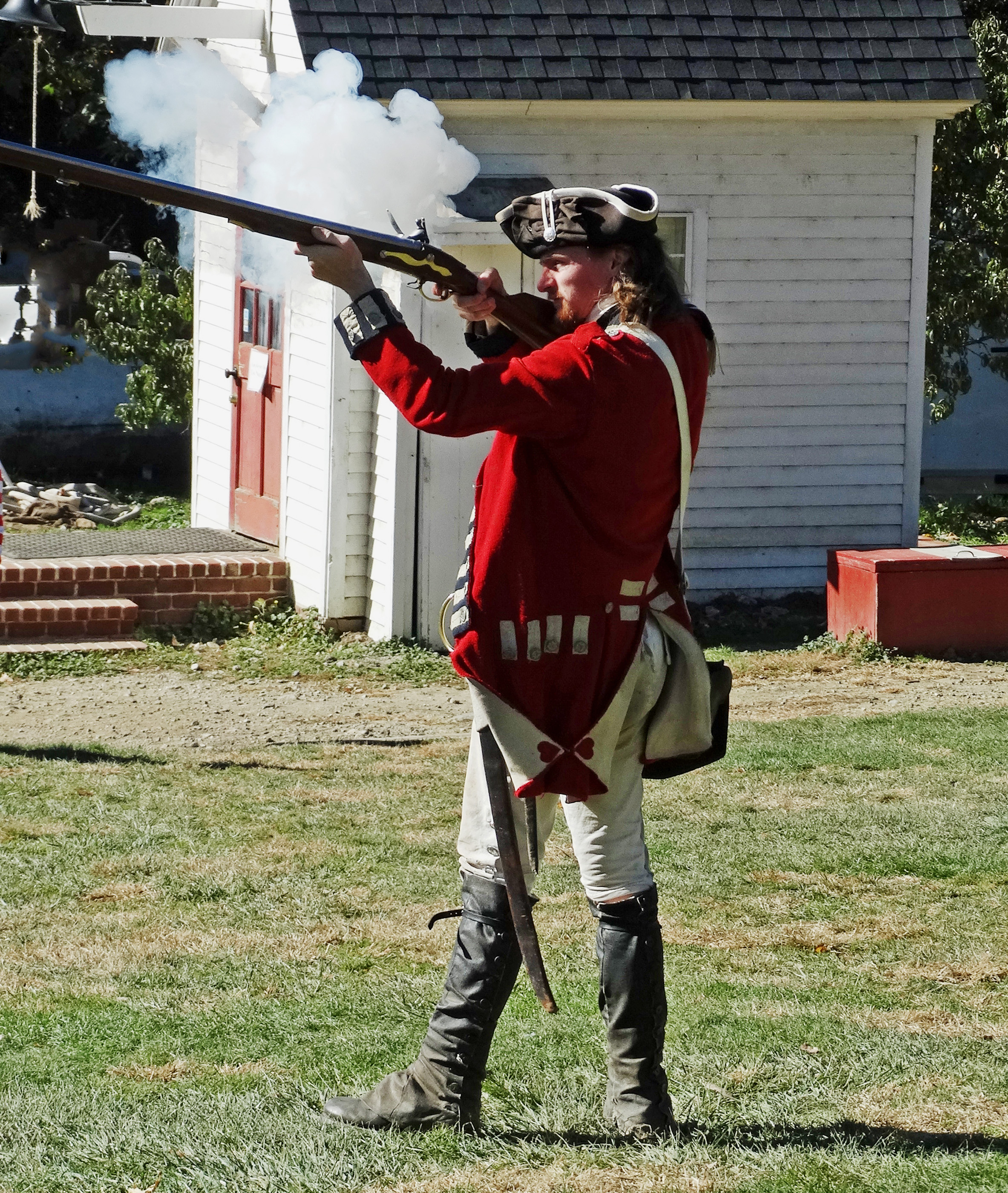
A re-enactor dressed in the uniform of the British Army during the American Revolutionary War

Known famously in British folklore as the "Red Coats", the hardened soldiers were the backbone of the British Army in the 18th and the 19th centuries. There is no universally accepted explanation as to why the British wore red.

The classical British Regulars were most famous for their actions at the Battle of Culloden (1746), the Seven Years' War (1756–1763), the American Revolutionary War (1775–1783), the Peninsular War (1808–1815), the War of 1812 (1812–1815) and the Waterloo campaign (1815). During the Napoleonic Wars (1803–1815), the British Regulars were a well-disciplined group of foot soldiers with years of combat experience, including in the Americas, the Irish Rebellion of 1798 and the War of 1812.

Most of the British regulars were between the ages of 18 and 29, and over 60% were 5 feet 4 inches (1.63 m) to 5 feet 7 inches (1.70 m) tall. At the time, the British government did not allow enlisted men to be older than 45.

Although typically under English command, many of the enlisted Regulars were either Scottish or Irish. A small number of Regulars were from Prussia and other states of the German Confederation. From those multiple origins also came the two different schools of thought: the American and the German. The American school focused on open-formation light infantry tactics, which were well suited for areas of rough terrain, and dense forested areas, which were best suited against enemies that had no cavalry or artillery. It also favoured infantry ranks of two deep and the use of light infantry with rifles. The German school focused on disciplined close-drill order, which was well suited for the vast European Plain. That approach was preferred in large battlefields if the enemy had large numbers of cavalry and artillery. It favoured infantry ranks of three deep and the use of smoothbore muskets.

In April 1775, during Paul Revere's midnight ride, Revere's warning, according to eyewitness accounts of the ride and Revere's own descriptions, was "The Regulars are coming out!", in reference to the British regulars.

After 1855, starting in India and gradually extending to other colonial outposts, the scarlet uniforms were often replaced with khaki on campaign for the tactical reason of camouflage. But it was not until 1902, with the introduction of a universal khaki service dress, that scarlet was officially abandoned as the campaign dress for European operations.

== Sources ==
- Moran, Donald Norman. "The British Army During the American Revolution". americanrevolution.org.
- "The National Army Museum (homepage)". National Army Museum. Archived from the original on April 1, 2005 – via Wayback Machine.
