= John Enys (naturalist) =

New Zealand runholder and naturalist

John Davies Enys (11 October 1837 – 7 November 1912) was a New Zealand runholder and naturalist. He was born in Penryn, Cornwall, England to John Samuel Enys (1796 – 1872) and Catherine (née Gilbert) and was educated at Harrow School. In 1861, he went to New Zealand with John Acland and sent flowering plants, shrubs and trees to Cornwall, for the gardens at Enys House.

== See also ==
- Enys family of Enys in Cornwall
