= Davies Gilbert =

British engineer and politician

Davies Gilbert FRS FSA
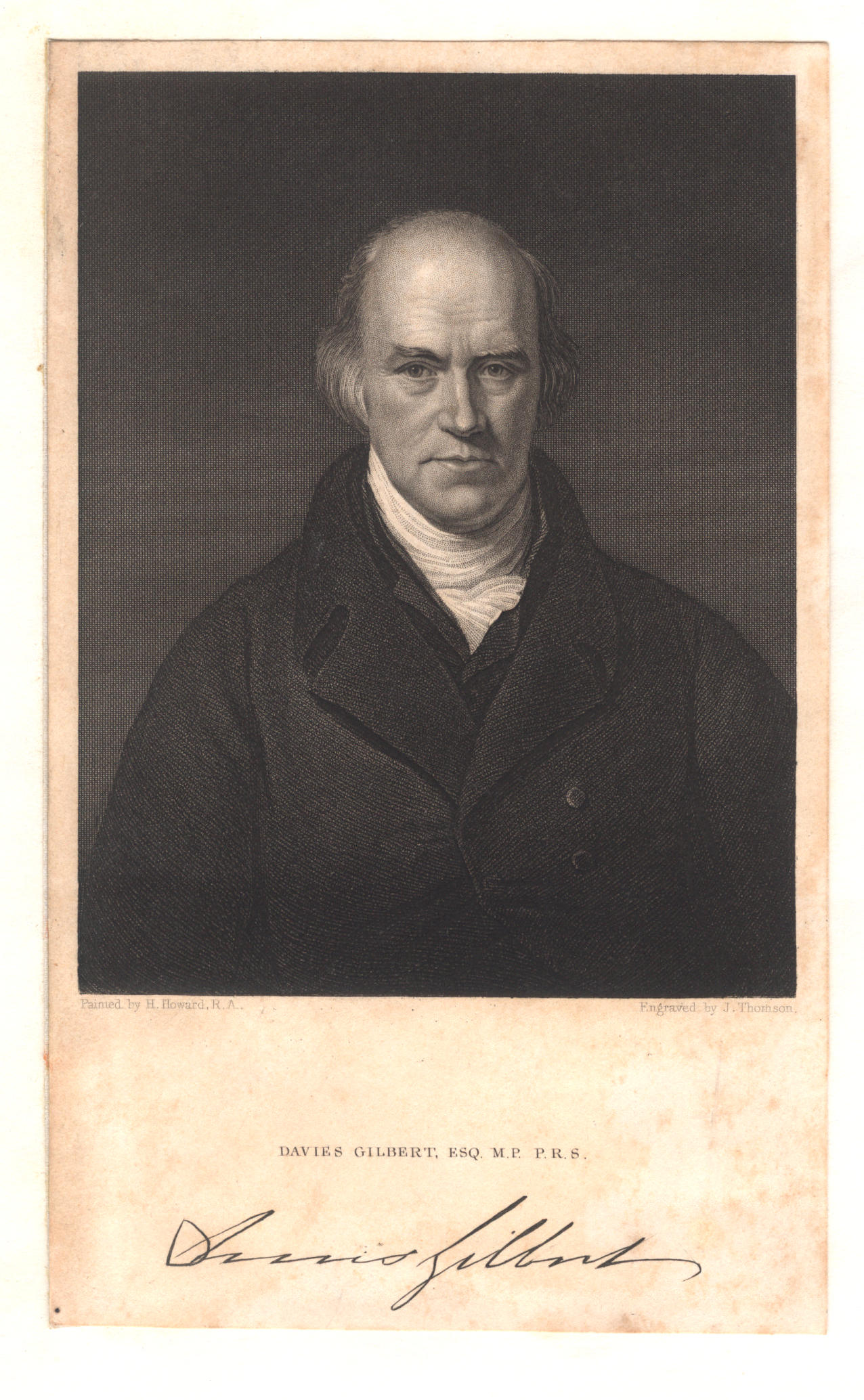
- Born: Davies Giddy; 6 March 1767; St Erth, Penzance, Cornwall, Great Britain
- Died: 24 December 1839 (aged 72); Eastbourne, Sussex, England
- Spouse: Mary Ann Gilbert
- Scientific career
- Fields: Engineering
- Workplaces: Royal Society

24th President of the Royal Society
- In office 1827–1830
- Preceded by: Humphry Davy
- Succeeded by: Prince Augustus Frederick

Davies Gilbert (born Giddy; 6 March 1767 – 24 December 1839) was a British engineer, author, and politician. He was elected to the Royal Society on 17 November 1791 and served as its President from 1827 to 1830. He changed his name to Gilbert in 1817 and served as Member of Parliament, first for Helston in Cornwall and then for Bodmin.

== Biography ==
Davies Giddy was born on 6 March 1767, the second of the three children of Reverend Edward Giddy, curate of St Erth's Church, and his wife Catherine, daughter of Henry Davies of Tredrea, St Erth in Cornwall. His parents' first child, also Davies by forename, died within 24 hours of birth in 1766, and their third child, Mary Philippa Davies Giddy (known as Philippa) was born in 1769. The Giddy family moved to Penzance, living on Chapel Street in 1775, until Giddy's mother Catherine inherited the family home of Tredrea back in St Erth. By 1780 the family returned to St Erth, and Davies was taught by his father, alongside his sister Philippa. Davies Giddy would later adopt Gilbert as his surname, the maiden name of his wife, the agronomist Mary Ann Gilbert, whom he married at Easter of 1808.

Davies was educated first at Penzance Grammar School and then by his father, and by Rev Malachy Hitchins, the mathematical astronomer. At the age of 17, at the recommendation of Hitchins, he was sent to Bristol to join the Mathematical Academy of Benjamin Donne where he remained for three years. His sister Philippa simultaneously finished her own schooling with the famous bluestocking Hannah More. He went up to Pembroke College, Oxford in 1786, whence he graduated with a MA on 29 June 1789.

He was elected to the Royal Society on 17 November 1791 and served as its President from 1827 to 1830. Davies was High Sheriff of Cornwall from 1792 to 1793. He served in the House of Commons as Member of Parliament for Helston in Cornwall from 1804 to 1806 and for Bodmin from 1806 to 1832.

Giddy was a close friend of the physician Thomas Beddoes, had attended Beddoes' lectures at Oxford when Beddoes became University Reader in Chemistry in 1788 and was in regular correspondence with him over the latter's plans for a Pneumatic Institution in Bristol. Giddy was an early supporter of Humphry Davy and persuaded Beddoes to employ him in the laboratory at the institute.

The Dictionary of National Biography article says of him:

"Gilbert's importance to the development of science in the early nineteenth century lay in his faith that science provided the best means to tackle practical problems and in his facility as a parliamentary promoter of scientific ventures."

His mathematical skills were sought by early engineering pioneers such as Jonathan Hornblower, Richard Trevithick and Thomas Telford. He also had an interest in the history and culture of Cornwall. For instance, he removed a Celtic cross from near Truro, on the Redruth Road (where it had found new use as a gatepost), and took it to a churchyard in his new home of Eastbourne. When asked why he carried off a Cornish Cross and re-erected it in Eastbourne by the Rev. Canon Hockin, of Phillack, Davies replied, It was to show the poor, ignorant folk that there was something bigger in the world than a flint!

He changed his name to Gilbert in 1817. In 1822 he collected and published a number of Cornish carols and in 1838 assembled and published A Parochial History of Cornwall.

He edited for publication a Cornish Language poem about the Passion: Passyon agan Arluth, as Mount Calvary (1826). He was elected to the Society of Antiquaries in 1820. Gilbert was the President of the Royal Geological Society of Cornwall from its foundation in 1814 until his death. He was elected a Foreign Honorary Member of the American Academy of Arts and Sciences in 1832.

Davies Gilbert was opposed to mass education during his time in parliament. When the Parochial Schools Bill of 1807 was debated in the Commons, Tory MP Davies Gilbert warned the House that:

"However specious in theory the project might be of giving education to the labouring classes of the poor, it would, in effect, be found to be prejudicial to their morals and happiness; it would teach them to despise their lot in life, instead of making them good servants in agriculture and other laborious employments to which their rank in society had destined them; instead of teaching them the virtue of subordination, it would render them factious and refractory, as is evident in the manufacturing counties; it would enable them to read seditious pamphlets, vicious books and publications against Christianity; it would render them insolent to their superiors; and, in a few years, the result would be that the legislature would find it necessary to direct the strong arm of power towards them and to furnish the executive magistrates with more vigorous powers than are now in force. Besides, if this Bill were to pass into law, it would go to burthen the country with a most enormous and incalculable expense, and to load the industrious orders with still heavier imposts. (Hansard, House of Commons, Vol. 9, Col. 798, 13 June 1807, quoted in Chitty 2007:15–16)"

He died in Eastbourne in Sussex on Christmas Eve 1839.

== Marriage and family ==
On 18 April 1808 he married Mary Ann Gilbert, and in 1816 he took his wife's surname, Gilbert, to perpetuate it. This enabled the couple to inherit the extensive property in Sussex of her uncle, Thomas Gilbert, who had no male heir.

Three daughters and a son survived him. Their son, John Davies Gilbert (5 December 1811 – 16 April 1854) was elected a Fellow of the Royal Society in April 1834 but does not seem to have published any scientific work. Their eldest daughter, Catherine, married John Samuel Enys (born 1796) on 17 April 1834. She was the mother of the notable New Zealand naturalist, John Enys (11 October 1837 – 7 November 1912). Their second daughter, Annie, married Rev. Henry Owen, rector of Heveningham, Suffolk on 4 December 1851. The other daughters were Mary Susannah and Hester Elizabeth.

== Publications ==
Books and publications written or edited by Davies Gilbert include:

- Plain Statement of the Bullion Question (1811)
- Some Ancient Christmas Carols, with the Tunes to which they were formerly sung in the West of England. Collected by D. Gilbert. London: J. Nichols and Son, (1822).
- Some Ancient Christmas Carols, with the tunes to which they were formerly sung in the West of England. pp. x, 79. London: J. Nichols and Son, 1823
- "On the vibrations of heavy bodies in cycloidal and in circular arches, as compared with their descents through free space; including an estimate of the variable circular excess in vibrations continually decreasing." By Davies Gilbert, .. London : printed by William Clowes, [1823] 15,[3]p. 'Extracted from the Quarterly Journal, Vol. XV'.
- A Cornish Cantata. [Names of places in Cornwall arranged in the form of verses.] [Privately printed? East-Bourn?] 1826.
- Mount Calvary; or, the History of the Passion, Death and Resurrection of Jesus Christ, written in Cornish (as it may be conjectured) some centuries past. Interpreted in English, in ... 1682, by J. Keigwin . Edited by D. Gilbert. pp. xxii. 96. Nichols and Son: London, 1826.
- "On the expediency of assigning Specific Names to all such Functions of Simple Elements as represent definite physical properties; with the suggestion of a new term in mechanics; illustrated by an investigation of the Machine moved by Recoil" ... From the Philosophical Transactions. pp. 14. [Privately printed:] London, 1827.
- "Some Collections and Translations respecting St. Neot, and the former state of his Church." In : Hedgeland (J. P.) A Description ... of the ... decorations ... in the Church of St. Neot, etc. 1830.
- A Cornish dialogue between Tom Pengersick and Dic. Trengurtha. East-Bourn : Davies Gilbert, [ca. 1835](In verse.)
- The Parochial History of Cornwall, Founded on the Manuscript Histories of Mr. Hals and Mr. Tonkin; with Additions and Various Appendices, 4 vols., London, 1838. (includes copious extracts from J. Whitaker, Daniel Lysons and Samuel Lysons, &c. and geological notices by Dr. Boase).
  - Vol.1, London, 1838
  - Vol.2, London, 1838
  - Vol.3, London, 1838
  - Vol.4, London, 1838

In 1831, Gilbert gave evidence to a Parliamentary select committee on steam carriages, which is included in the committee's report, published in 1834.

== See also ==
- List of presidents of the Royal Society

Parliament of the United Kingdom
Preceded by James Harris; John Penn	Member of Parliament for Helston; 1804–1806; With: James Harris 1804–1805; Archibald Primrose 1805–1806	Succeeded by Sir John Shelley; Archibald Primrose
Preceded by Josias Porcher; James Topping	Member of Parliament for Bodmin; 1806–1832; With: William Wingfield, 1806–1807; Sir William Oglander, 1807–1812; Charles Bathurst, 1812–1818; Thomas Bradyll, 1818–1820; John Wilson Croker, 1820–1826; Horace Seymour, 1826–1832	Succeeded by William Peter; Samuel Thomas Spry
Professional and academic associations
Preceded by Humphry Davy	24th President of the Royal Society; 1827–1830	Succeeded by Prince Augustus Frederick, Duke of Sussex
