= Mary Ann Gilbert =

English agronomist

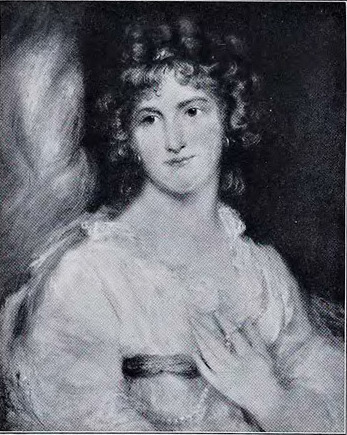
- Portrait by Ozias Humphry (1796)
- Born: 1776; Lewes, Sussex, United Kingdom
- Died: 26 April 1845 (aged 68–69)
- Occupations: Practitioner and publiciser in agricultural improvement, advocate of the impoverished agricultural labourer
- Spouse(s): Davies Gilbert born Davies Giddy, (1767 – 1839), Scientist and Parliamentarian

Mary Ann Gilbert (1776 – 26 April 1845) was an English agronomist.

== Birth and childhood ==
Mary Ann Gilbert was the daughter of Thomas Gilbert, who was a grocer in Lewes, Sussex. When he died in 1782, he left (by her own account) his widow and daughter almost penniless. After her mother's death in 1807, she frequently stayed with her uncle Charles at Eastbourne.

== Marriage ==
On 18 April 1808, she married Davies Giddy, a Cornish landowner, who had served as High Sheriff of the Duchy. He was an M.P. for Cornish constituencies from 1806 to 1832. Among his roles in Parliament was as Chairman of the Board of Agriculture. Mary Ann Gilbert was passionately concerned about low agricultural productivity and the plight of the rural poor. Davies was more interested in how the Parish Rate for the support of unemployed might be reduced.

In 1814, Mary Ann Gilbert's uncle, Charles Gilbert, died. In his will, he left her much property in Sussex, or to a future husband, if he changed his name to "Gilbert". In December 1817 Davies Giddy took his wife's surname, "Gilbert", to perpetuate it. In January 1818, the names of their children were also changed.

== Agronomic experiment ==
Sharing her husband's interest, Mary Ann Gilbert managed some successful practical agronomical experiments at Beachy Head in feeding the poor, or rather, teaching them to feed themselves using land no one else wanted, for a fair rent. She presented the statistical results of these works to her husband's political, scientific and "County" contacts. She was also a prominent member of the Labourer's Friend Society (later the Society for Improving the Condition of the Labouring Classes). Among those who advised her were Richard Whately, Anglican Archbishop of Dublin and his brother, the Vicar of Cookham in Berkshire, Edwin Chadwick and William Gill, of Chacewater, Cornwall.

== Topographic illustrations ==
Her illustrations appear in Thomas Bond's Topographical and historical sketches of the boroughs of East and West Looe, in the county of Cornwall (1823). Bond was a cousin of her husband.

== Children ==
Of their eight children, three daughters and a son survived her husband. Their son, John Davies Gilbert (5 December 1811 – 16 April 1854) was elected a Fellow of the Royal Society in April, 1834. He played a significant part, as landowner, in developing the town of Eastbourne.

== Death ==
Mary Ann Gilbert died on 26 April 1845 at Eastbourne

== See also ==
- British Agricultural Revolution

== Sources, Notes and References ==
=== Sources ===
- Todd, A.C. (1956). "An Answer to Poverty in Sussex, 1830-45". Agricultural History Review. 4 (1): 45–51.
- ODNB David Philip Miller (2004). "'Gilbert (Giddy) Davies (1767–1839)". Oxford Dictionary of National Biography (online ed.). Oxford University Press. doi:10.1093/ref:odnb/10686. (Subscription, Wikipedia Library access or UK public library membership required.)
- A.C. Todd (1967), Beyond the blaze: A biography of Davies Gilbert, D.Bradford Barton
