= General Wadsworth =

General Wadsworth may refer to:

- James Wadsworth (lawyer) (1730–1816), Connecticut Militia brigadier general in the American Revolutionary War
- James S. Wadsworth (1807–1864), Union Army brevet major general
- Peleg Wadsworth (1748–1829), Continental Army brigadier general
- William Wadsworth (officer) (1765–1833), New York State Militia brigadier general
