= Sweet Briar (Geneseo, New York) =

Historic house in New York, United States

- U.S. National Register of Historic Places
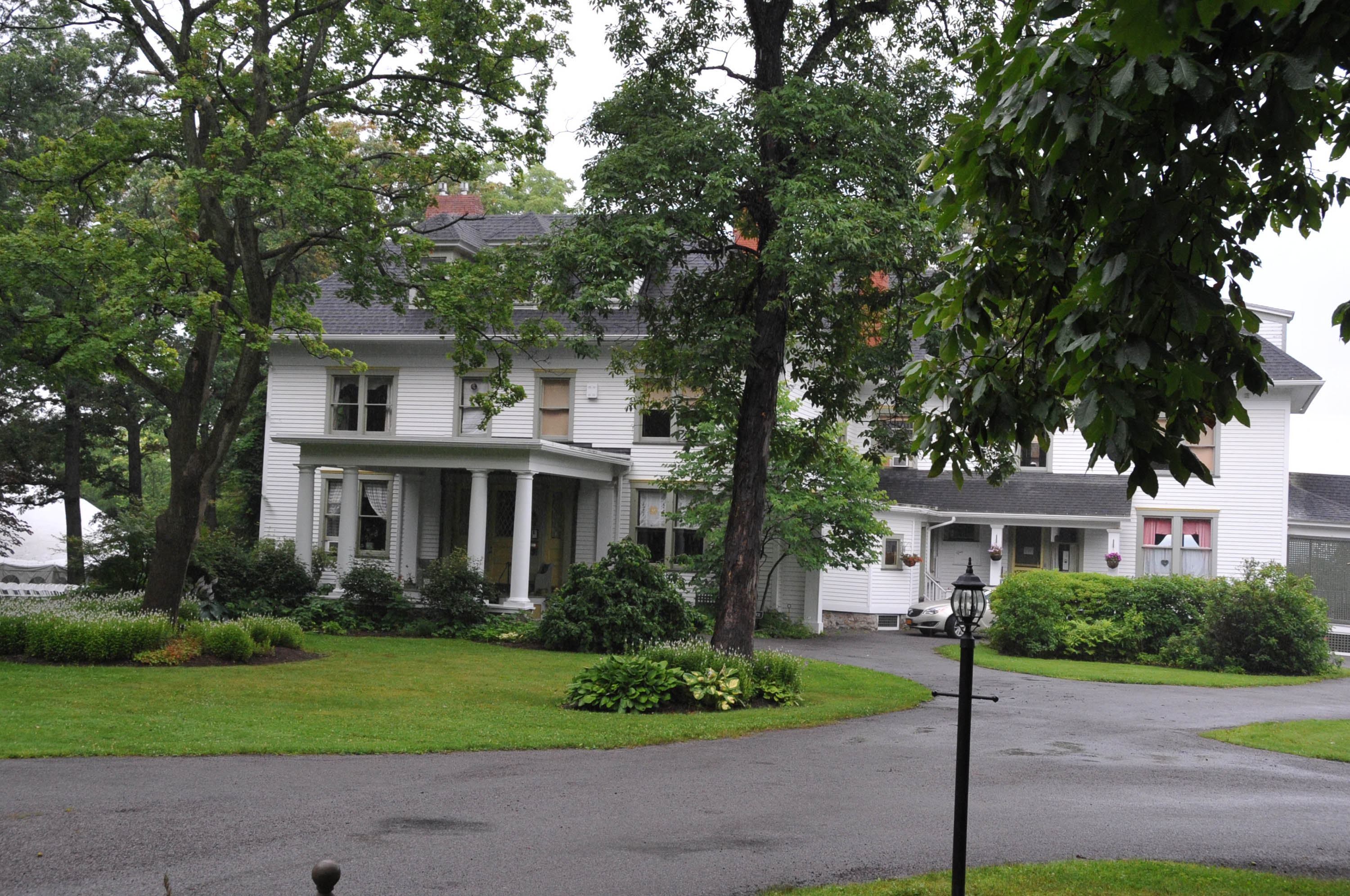

- Location within New York Location within the United States
- Nearest city: 5126 Mount Morris Rd., near Geneseo, New York
- Coordinates: 42°46′28.95″N 77°49′41.29″W
- Area: 246.243 acres (99.651 ha)
- Built: 1898
- Built by: Forbes, Edward
- Architect: Austen, George
- NRHP reference No.: 10000104
- Added to NRHP: March 29, 2010

Sweet Briar is a historic farm house located near Geneseo in Livingston County, New York.

== History ==
The main house was built about 1898 by George and Isabel Valle Austen on land that had been previously owned by Horatio Jones and the Wadsworth family. It was then the home of Winthrop and Margaret Ward Terry Chanler. It is a 2 1/2-story frame building with clapboard siding and a hipped roof with dormers. It is in a "U" shape and features a grand Tuscan colonnade. Also on the property are contributing gate posts, a stable, fountain, two tenant houses, and the Chapel of St. Felicitas. The chapel was built in 1913 and is a small stucco building with a slate roof and stained glass windows. The structure was later moved to the neighboring home near Fall Brook. The main house (with ten acres) was sold in 2004 and operated as a bed and breakfast, wedding venue, spa and yoga studio until 2014. Currently Sweet Briar is a private residence.

It was listed on the National Register of Historic Places in 2010.

== See also ==
- List of Registered Historic Places in Livingston County, New York
