= William Wadsworth (general) =

American militia officer (1765–1833)

Portrait of Wadsworth by John Trumbull

Brigadier General William Wadsworth (1765 – 15 February 1833) was an American militia officer and landowner who served in the War of 1812. He commanded the New York militia contingent of the American army which was defeated at the Battle of Queenston Heights. Wadsworth waived his right to command over Lieutenant Colonel Winfield Scott of the United States Army. During the battle, Wadsworth faced the British at all times so he would not be shot in the back and appear to be cowardly. Waving his sword and swearing at the troops back across the river, hoping to instill the fighting spirit in them, he made a genuine but vain attempt to get the militia to cross and reinforce their position. At the end of the battle, Wadsworth was taken prisoner when a portion of the American army, cut off on the Canadian side of the Niagara River, surrendered to the British.

== Family ==
William Wadsworth was a scion of the prominent Wadsworth family of Connecticut. He was a sixth generation descendant of William Wadsworth (1595–1675), who was one of the Founders of Hartford, Connecticut. In 1790, with his charismatic brother James Wadsworth, he moved from Connecticut to the Genesee Valley of Western New York State.

Settling in "Big Tree" on June 9, 1790, on the east bank of the Genesee River, William and his brother went from the leading pioneers of this unsettled region to one of its largest wealthiest land holders. As the settlement in the area increased, William was elected Town supervisor for 21 years. Before and during his tenure, William created and took charge of the area's local militia and eventually took command of the Genesee Valley militia. By the time hostilities broke out between the U.S. and Great Britain in 1812, William Wadsworth was promoted to brigadier general.

William never married and history records no known children.

== Visit from the Duke ==
Despite the fact William and his brother were now by any standard wealthy, they were living in their first log cabin when, in the summer of 1795, François de La Rochefoucauld, 7th Duke of La Rochefoucauld arrived from Canawaugus, New York, with his entourage of a young Englishman, servants and a poodle named Cartouche. The duke, who had letters of introduction to "those great American Landlords, Messrs. James and William Wadsworth", was somewhat taken aback by their manorial dwelling. He described it in his memoirs as "a small log house as dirty as any I have ever seen" It was cluttered with stores of all kinds and live chickens. The duke says, "It stank so I could hardly bear it." The duke's dog apparently ate one of Wadsworth's chickens and his servant Jenny told that "eminent nobleman" what she thought of him and his dog. William's hospitality extended him an invitation to "stay for a week," which was hastily declined. The duke stayed the night, but William could not see them off properly, as Captain, he had to attend to the muster of militia early the following morning. The duke left that day for Buffalo and continued on his "Grand Tour" into Canada.

== Treaty of Big Tree ==
Between August 20, 1797 and September 16, 1797, William Wadsworth hosted the United States delegation for the Treaty of Big Tree in his log cabin and new cobblestone house. A meadow between the Wadsworths' cabin at Big Tree and the gigantic oak by the river, which gave the place its name, was the site of the conference.

Nearly three thousand Seneca and other members of the Six Nations of the Iroquois attended the conference. Their representatives were the Chiefs Cornplanter, Red Jacket, Farmer's Brother, Tall Chief, Little Beard and others, the Clan Mothers of the nation, and Mary Jemison. The United States' representatives were Colonel Jeremiah Wadsworth, Commissioner representing the US Government, Thomas Morris representing his father, Robert Morris, General William Shepard representing Massachusetts, Theophilus Cazenove and Paolo Busti, representatives for the Holland Land Company, Captain Israel Chapin, representing the Department of Indian Affairs, Joseph Ellicott, Land surveyor, and James Rees as acting secretary.

The treaty was signed on September 16, 1797, after nearly a month of sometimes heated, back and forth negotiations. It opened up the territory west of the Genesee River and established ten Reservations for the Seneca in Western New York.

== Battle of Queenston Heights ==
On June 18, 1812, War was declared between the United States and Great Britain. That same day, William Wadsworth was promoted to brigadier general and put in command of the 7th Brigade, 1st Division made up of the 18th, 19th, and 20th regiments of the New York State Detached Militia. These regiments represented the Counties of Seneca, Cayuga and Ontario respectively.

The 20th Regiment contained the various companies of Ontario County, New York in which was William's original Geneseo Company now under the command of Lieutenant Colonel Peter Allen.

At the outbreak of the War of 1812, the Niagara Frontier was unprepared to defend its settlements. Many who lived along the Niagara River which separates Canada from New York were alarmed by the military activity on the Canadian side of the river. They wrote to New York Congressman and Quartermaster General, Peter B. Porter, on April 15, 1812, about their concerns of the lack of arms and ammunition, adding "there is not five muskets that is fit to use in this place & they are not to be had in this quarter." Governor Daniel D. Tompkins was made aware the New York Militia was destitute of arms, camp equipment, blankets, and other items. Particularly, at the settlements of Black Rock, now a part of Buffalo, New York, and the settlement at Lewiston, New York.

On June 25, 1812, one week after his promotion and the declaration of war, Governor Tompkins ordered Brigadier General William Wadsworth and his newly formed 7th Brigade, with two cannons and ball, to command the Niagara Frontier and reinforce the 400 regular army at Black Rock. The Governor's instruction made it clear Wadsworth was "at liberty to act offensively as well as defensively" according to the circumstances along the river. Wadsworth confessed to the governor, in a letter, that he lacked military experience and was "ignorant of even the minor duties of the duty to which you have assigned me," and asked to have an experienced "military secretary" assigned to him, a request to which the governor complied. The Governor later assigned the more experienced Major General Amos Hall to overall command of the Niagara Frontier militia on July 28, 1812, until Major General Stephen van Rensselaer could assume the command on August 11, 1812. It was for these reasons Wadsworth earned the epitaph "the reluctant general."

Wadsworth marched his column of about 900 men from Canandaigua and reached Batavia on July 1, picking up U.S. regular troops along the way. These consisted of the 13th U.S. Infantry Regiment under Lieutenant Colonel John Chrystie and Major James Mullany; the 23rd Infantry Regiment under Lieutenant William Clarke; and the 3rd U.S. Artillery Regiment under Captain James McKeon. Wadsworth reached Black Rock on July 3 with a combined force of 1600 men. He immediately dispatched militia reinforcements to Fort Schlosser at Niagara Falls, New York, and to Lewiston and sent the detachment of regulars on to Fort Niagara. About a week later four more companies of volunteer militia attached to the 20th regiment arrived, along with 20 horsemen acting as courier riders. This group brought General Wadsworth's combined strength to nearly 1,900 men at arms (including invalids and absentees) by July 10, 1812.

General Wadsworth immediately appraised the defenses between Buffalo and Fort Niagara. He reports that Fort Niagara "is very much decayed" and under-gunned. He requested heavy ordnance and field artillery. He asked the Governor to dispatch 2,000 more troops and that he immediately send food, tents, shoes and equipment for the men currently there. He went to work building batteries and breast works, but this was nearly futile "without axes, hoes, shovels or anything of this kind."

Per Wadsworth's request, Governor Tompkins sent his personal assistant, the engineer and artillerist Nicholas Gray, to assist Wadsworth. Upon his arrival on July 18, Gray reported to Tompkins that he was impressed with General Wadsworth whose "camps were in good health and orderly" and that he "had ordered a military school, both for officers and soldiers... and pays unwearied attention to the troops, and is forming a system which has as its objective the organization of the staff and camp duties."

On July 24, 1812, Major General Amos Hall arrived at Buffalo and took command, but this was only temporary, as both Wadsworth and Hall knew they were to be replaced soon. On August 11, 1812, Major General Stephen Van Rensselaer arrived to Lewiston and took Command.

On September 4, 1812, Major General Van Rennselaer writes in his general orders "To the Commanding officer of the 7th Brigade [General Wadsworth] and to the Colonels of the 18th and 20th Regiments [Wadsworth's original Company], the General tenders his acknowledgments, for the strict discipline of their troops and the preservation of their health." This order following months of successive general orders issuing complaints and instructions to the officers about the troop's lack of discipline, order, and sanitation.

Stephan Van Rensselaer was a popular Federalist politician and an opponent in the gubernatorial candidacy of New York in 1813. His rival, Governor Tompkins, had appointed him to command the American army for political purposes, perhaps to get rid of him, as he was an inexperienced commander.

Under presidential pressure from Washington, D.C. Van Rensselaer began making plans to cross the Niagara River from his base at Lewiston, NY to capture the village of Queenston, Ontario and the nearby heights. He ordered Brigadier General Alexander Smyth to join him in Lewiston with his troops on October 11, 1812. However, Smyth, of the regular US Army, commanding at Buffalo, had issues with taking orders from him. Believing van Rensselaer's hasty maneuver unwise, he and his men remained conspicuously absent from the campaign that followed.

In the pre-dawn hours of October 13, 1812, Lieutenant Colonel John Chrystie and the first landing party made their way across the river. After Col. Chrystie's boat came under surprise fire, his crew retreated to Lewiston. Captain John E. Wool, having landed, took command of the 13th United States Infantry Regiment, led a group of American soldiers up a fisherman's path to the British artillery stationed on top of the heights. His men were able to take out the British artillery emplacements on Queenston Heights.

After realizing the Americans had landed, British Major General Isaac Brock sent a message from Queenston to British Major General Roger H. Sheaffe at Fort George, requesting immediate reinforcements to block the American landings. In the meantime General Brock ordered his men and Indian Allies to retake the heights.

Major General Van Rensselaer worked to consolidate the position on the Canadian side of the river. Ordering the heights to be fortified, he placed Lieutenant Colonel Winfield Scott in command with Brigadier General William Wadsworth leading the militia. Despite the earlier success, Van Rensselaer's position was tenuous as only around 600 men had crossed being 350 Regular Army and only 250 Militia had volunteered to cross with Wadsworth.

After Van Rensselaer gave command of the invasion party to Lieutenant Colonel Winfield Scott. Major Isaac Roach recalls that when Scott "took command he did not know there was a General officer on the grounds. The latter [Wadsworth], who was in plain clothes at the time, modestly made his rank known, insisted on supporting Scott, which he did, with zeal and valor, in every combat."

General Brock led the British charge up the heights that nearly succeeded, but it ultimately was repelled. Brock, an obvious target with his commanding height and general's uniform, was wounded in the hand and then shot and killed by American sharpshooters. A second charge, this time under the command of Lieutenant Colonel John Macdonell, soon followed. The Americans repulsed this second change, killing Macdonell and severely wounding Captain Wool in the thigh.

Meanwhile, General Wadsworth with a detachment of militia volunteers and Winfield Scott's regulars crossed the river to reinforce Captain Wool's position and take command. Wadsworth had hoped "that his example might have a better effect than his orders in making the militia cross."

British reinforcements arrived from Fort George to Queenston, including British artillery. Opening fire from the village, it made crossing the river hazardous. On the heights 300 Iroquois began attacking Scott and Wadsworth's outposts.

Frustrated, van Rensselaer worked tirelessly to convince the militia to embark to reinforce Scott and Wadsworth. However, most of the citizen Militia, low on ammunition, knowing reinforcements were not in the vicinity, hearing the war cries of the Indians, and in full view of the British reinforcements approaching across the river, stood by their known right, as volunteer militia, to refuse to invade or fight in a foreign country. By law, militiamen were not required to cross a border under arms, but could volunteer to do so.

Ultimately unsuccessful, Van Rensselaer dispatched a note to Scott and Wadsworth giving them permission "to withdraw if the situation warranted."

Abandoned by the militia, hearing the Mohawk war cries under John Brant and fearing massacre, Wadsworth's men retreated. During their retreat Wadsworth was wounded in the right arm. His line collapsing, Scott, too, fell back, ultimately retreating down the slope above the river. With no escape and the Mohawks, embittered over the loss of two chiefs, in pursuit, Scott was forced to surrender the remnants of his command to British Major General Roger Sheaffe. Wadsworth's men too, soon ran out of ammunition and were forced back to the edge of the heights where "Thousands could testify to seeing him [Wadsworth] standing on... land at the edge of the bluff, pleading... to his men on the safe bank to join him and save the day. When they would not, he shook his bright sword and cursed them so terribly that one awed eyewitness wrote, 'His language was said to be the worst in the whole American Army'." Another witness later described Wadsworth as "the most eloquently profane officer in the [US] army."

After the bugles hailed the cease-fire, General Wadsworth was brought before General Roger H. Sheaffe. Upon introductions, British Captain James Crooks recalls, Wadsworth "drew his sword and presented the handle to General Sheaffe who said, 'I understand General your people have surrendered,' to which Wadsworth made no other answer other than bowing his head in token that it was so."

The British tallied the total number captured at 436 regulars and 489 of militia. They released the walking wounded the day after the battle. The militia was released on parole on October 15. Surprisingly, among them was Brigadier General William Wadsworth, who had negotiated the release of Major James Mullany and Captain Peter Ogilvie. The release of such high-ranking officers was the cause of much consternation and dismay among the British troops and their Indian allies. General Sheaffe relates he allowed Wadsworth's release in the hope "his going with the militia will... only tend to ensure a strict execution of the agreement." The other regular officers were released several months later after the terms of the exchange agreement between the parties was honored.

Shortly after his parole General Wadsworth returned to his home on the Genesee Valley to recuperate. Though disappointed with the lack of militia to volunteer on that fateful day Wadsworth still defends them. He later writes to Van Rensselaer, "I do not say where the regulars and militia who were not there... were, but it is clear they were not where they ought to have been. ...I am conscious that on the 13th and that on every other day during the campaign, I endeavored to do my duty. With this I shall rest satisfied, however others may estimate my services. I am aware that the militia have their faults, but they have their merit, too, and it is that merit of which they ought not to be deprived, unless it is intended to render them useless in the future."

When William died in 1833 his brother James Wadsworth inherited his estate. His obituary noted that "Few officers... have been more universally respected and beloved by their soldiers."
