= Eliza Chappell Porter =

American educator (1807–1888)

Eliza Emily Chappell Porter
- Born: Eliza Emily Chappell; November 5, 1807; Geneseo, New York, U.S.
- Died: January 1, 1888 (aged 80); Santa Barbara, California, U.S.
- Resting place: Rosehill Cemetery, Chicago
- Monuments: Eliza Chappell School, Chicago
- Occupation: Teacher
- Years active: 1823–1875
- Organization: U.S. Sanitary Commission
- Known for: First public school teacher in Chicago
- Title: Associate Director, Northwest Sanitary Commission
- Term: July 1863–?
- Movement: Underground Railroad
- Spouse: Rev. Jeremiah Porter
- Children: Nine

Eliza Emily Porter (née Chappell; November 5, 1807 – January 1, 1888) was the first public school teacher in Chicago, at Fort Dearborn. She established normal schools, educated settlers and American Indians at Mackinac Island, aided the wounded during the American Civil War as a member of the U.S. Sanitary Commission, participated in the Underground Railroad, and taught freedmen.

== Early years ==
Porter was born on November 5, 1807, in Geneseo, New York, the youngest daughter of eight children. Porter's father, Robert Chappell, was supposedly the descendant of "Huguenots banished from France under the Edict of Nantes in 1688, who found refuge, with their persecuted brethren, in England". Robert moved to Franklin County, New York, then to Geneseo (Livingston County, New York). Eliza Chappell was the eighth child born to Robert and Elizabeth Kneeland Chappell. She was described as a "bonny child, plump and fair, with curling auburn hair, and bright grey eyes".

Robert Chappell was widowed shortly after Porter's birth. Burdened with seven young children at home, he sent Porter to live with her niece, Mrs. Bower of Franklin County, New York. Bower wanted to adopt Porter, but Porter insisted on living with the family as a "little cousin". Porter "easily [distanced] her boy cousins in study, she was ambitious to rival them in outdoor sports". By age twelve, Porter returned home; at age fourteen, she joined the Presbyterian church.

Porter boarded with a reverend's family in Rochester, New York, at the age of fifteen, and attended school. By age sixteen, Porter took charge of a neighboring school as a teacher. She eagerly read any books that were available to her. Porter felt it was important to educate toddlers. "I am more and more convinced that parents and those who have the care of children do not regard with sufficient interest the first three years," she wrote in her journal.

== Frontier work ==
Porter was friends with a Mr. and Mrs. Loomis, missionaries from Rochester, who introduced her to Mr. and Mrs. Robert Stuart, who desired a teacher for their family. Stuart was a partner of John Jacob Astor at the American Fur Company in Mackinac Island, Michigan. She studied the Infant School system, and departed for Mackinac Island in June 1831.

At the age of 22, she began teaching the Stuart children, as well as other children on the island and at the mission. Porter struggled with the responsibilities of a new teacher. She wrote in her journal that, "Her life, so redeemed, given back from the grave, she counted as in a peculiar sense 'not her own,'..." She saw the need for teachers as well as laborers, mechanics, and farmers to populate the frontier. She made a trip to New York to secure more teachers, and established schools in St. Ignace, Michigan. On June 19, 1832, Porter remarked on her teaching:

This day closes my third term, have had an examination in which the parents and friends of the school have evinced great interest. Could my dear friends at home have seen me surrounded by 54 (the present number of pupils) precious immortals, many of whom within nine months have learned to read and recite passages of scripture—could you have looked in upon us this morning, and followed us in our exercises I doubt not your hearts would have filled to overflowing.

== Spiritual life ==
Porter's moral fortitude could best be seen in the list of personal rules she adopted:

1. To rise with or before the sun.
2. To devote one hour to reading, meditation and prayer before leaving my room.
3. Should this precious season ever seem irksome and tasteless to remain until God manifests Himself.
4. To inquire with regard to all my movements: will this be for God's glory?
5. To examine carefully the motives which through each day have influenced my conduct.
6. To endeavor in my intercourse with all to do as I would wish to be done by.
7. To speak evil of no one. To do good to all.

8. To observe one day of each week as a season for private fasting and prayer.

Porter had a serious illness before teaching in Mackinac; many believed it was a miracle that she survived. Porter credited this miracle to her strong religious beliefs but she was still a product of the prejudices of the time:

23rd [June 1832] on my return from the mission accompanied by one of the sisters I called at some of the Indian lodges. We had a copy of St. John's Gospel and attempted to read to them but such indifference! Oh! When shall all this wandering miserable race believe the report? Soon! For the day of the Lord is at hand.

She also commented on Catholic families on the frontier:

19th [June 1833]. Last week after Miss O's arrival, went to the Point, four miles from Mackinaw to see if a school could be opened there. Never have I witnessed such scenes of wretchedness and want. About one hundred and eighty inhabitants. All Catholics except one or two families. French and Indian languages alone spoken there. Every man in the settlement a confirmed drunkard.

== Black Hawk War ==
During the Black Hawk War, the spread of cholera terrified the residents of Mackinac Island. On July 7, 1832, Porter wrote:

Mackinaw is now greatly perplexed. Fear and alarm take hold of many. The cause is not the movements of the Indians. We have not had any serious, perhaps I may say any fears from them. ... Three steamboats filed with troops are now on their passage. ... They spent one night in our harbor and left behind them two sick soldiers, whose disease has proved to be the dreaded scourge cholera.

== Chicago ==
Porter arrived in Chicago in June 1833 with the prospects of opening a school by September. The school was established in a small log house formerly used as a store. There were 25 students; they furnished their own chairs, "but those who were unable to do so had primitive seats supplied them". There were no desks. Some students paddled their canoes across the Chicago River to and from the school. The only teaching tools Porter had were "maps, a globe, scriptural texts and hymn books, and illustrations of geometry and astronomy".

In 1834, the school was moved into the first Presbyterian Church in Fort Dearborn, on the southwest corner of Lake and Clark Streets. The school was rented from the church for nine dollars a month. That year, Porter established a normal school for future teachers, located on the future site of LaSalle Street, for 12 girls who lived on the prairie.

=== Marriage ===
Porter married Rev. Jeremiah Porter, the youngest child of Dr. William Porter and Charlotte Porter, on June 15, 1835. Porter and Jeremiah first met on Mackinac Island during discussions about establishing a school. After the Porters were married, they left Chicago for Farmington, Illinois. They moved to Peoria, Illinois before settling in Green Bay, Wisconsin on January 4, 1851; they remained there until 1858. The Porters returned to Chicago when Jeremiah became pastor of Edwards Congregational Church.

Porter was always a thin, frail woman. She was able to overcome neuralgia and lost most of her teeth, but not her sense of humor. When Eliza traveled to New York to meet her future in-laws, her mother-in-law remarked "Oh! What can such a poor little hand do?"

== Civil War ==
The Porters were living in Chicago at the outbreak of the American Civil War; they promptly entered the service. As early as the summer of 1861, Porter visited Cairo, Illinois, organizing hospitals, distributing supplies, escorting volunteers, and seeing to the sick or wounded. In October 1861, Eliza became the office manager of the Chicago (later Northwestern) U.S. Sanitary Commission, which solicited food, medical dressings, and other supplies for use in frontline military hospitals.

After the Battle of Shiloh in early April 1862, Porter recognized that she would be more useful in the field. In July 1863, she returned to Chicago to act as associate director of the Chicago branch of the Northwest Sanitary Commission with fellow humanitarian Dorothea Dix. Most of 1862 was spent in field hospitals at Ft. Pickering where Jeremiah was stationed. Following the Battle of Vicksburg, Porter traveled to Chattanooga, Tennessee, where she worked side by side with Mary Ann Bickerdyke. Porter and Bickerdyke directed all manner of volunteer field-hospital work, such as cooking, laundering, distributing relief supplies, and — in emergencies — nursing the wounded.

Porter followed the U.S. Army to the Battle of Atlanta. Jeremiah served as Chaplain in Battery A of the First Illinois Light Artillery at Ft. Pickering. Porter secured nurses from Chicago, and on orders from medical director Dr. Charles McDougal, escorted the nurses to Savannah. The Porters followed the Union Army through Kentucky, Tennessee, and Georgia.

Porter worked closely with Bickerdyke distributing supplies and caring for the sick. Eliza helped treat the wounded in Memphis from the Battle of Vicksburg. After the battle, Porter went through Louisville to Nashville, then on to Alabama, where she assisted Lincoln Clark's wife at Huntsville Prison. She continued her relief work up until Sherman's Campaign.

== Activism ==
Both Porter and Jeremiah were active reformers. Jeremiah met abolitionist Elijah Lovejoy in Alton, Illinois, for an anti-slavery convention, and Porter educated children and veteran freedmen during and after the Civil War. She established a school in Memphis for African-American children. She participated in founding a school at Shiloh, Tennessee, for former slaves freed by the Emancipation Proclamation.

In Austin, Texas, Porter established a Sunday school for freed slave children. "She [Eliza] would have a multitude of little black children packed close as their little wriggling bodies would permit. I seem to see her standing before them in that rude room upon that rough floor her beautiful eyes beaming, her whole face illuminated with love while every eye was fastened upon her face as she taught them of God and His laws, of Jesus and His love." She went on to establish a kindergarten for African-American children in a missionary settlement in East Austin, Texas.

Porter and Jeremiah were active in the Underground Railroad. During their stay in Green Bay, Wisconsin, the Porter home was the last stop before slaves crossed into the safety of Canada. She regarded it as a "secret service before the Lord". When a fugitive slave and his three small children arrived at the Porters' doorstep in Green Bay in the middle of the night, Porter suggested housing the family in the church. For four days, the belfry served as a refuge until a sailboat could be procured to carry the passengers to a steamboat bound for Canada.

In addition to her medical assistance, Eliza made appeals to many politicians about obtaining speedier recovery of convalescent soldiers—especially sending those soldiers home to northern hospitals. Porter even appealed to Abraham Lincoln in Washington, D.C., in 1863:

But it is not for the dead I plead, but for those who still live, and are suffering home and heart sickness in Southern hospitals. We ask that as you are giving furloughs to all veterans who are able and willing to re-enlist from the ranks, you will not forget the sick and wounded veterans, but extend furloughs to them also.
... President Lincoln, do you know that the holding of our sick in government hospitals, is doing more in some sections of our country to prevent re-enlistment, and weaken confidence in our government than all other causes combined?

== Mexican frontier ==
After her service in the Civil War ended in October 1865, the Porters went to the "Mexican frontier" in Texas to distribute supplies to U.S. soldiers on behalf of the Sanitary and Christians Commissions. Porter also opened a Protestant school. She taught in the school herself until the autumn of 1866, when Jeremiah became the pastor of the Congregational church in Prairie du Chien, Wisconsin. By this time it had been five years since the Porters has settled into a home of their own. In 1868, the Porters returned to schoolwork in Brownsville, Texas, when Jeremiah became pastor of the Presbyterian Church there. In Brownsville, Eliza reopened the coeducational Rio Grande Seminary. After about a year in Brownsville, they returned to Chicago.

== Oklahoma and Wyoming Territory ==
Jeremiah was appointed Post Chaplain by the U.S. Senate in 1870, and sent to work at Fort Brown, Texas, on the north side of the Rio Grande. In January 1874, the Porters went to Fort Sill in the Oklahoma Territory, among the Comanche and Kiowa tribes, because Jeremiah was the chaplain for Ulysses S. Grant's command. Porter "taught the children of the garrison in a day school [Rio Grande Female Institute], gathered the laundresses for instruction and made herself the special friend of everyone in need".

Jeremiah was transferred to Ft. Russell, Wyoming in 1875. By this time, Porter's health started to deteriorate. After a bout with malaria and pneumonia, her lungs were never the same, making frontier living intolerable. She spent much time away from her husband, because she couldn't venture out in the cold. Porter was torn between wanting to be near her sons in Chicago, and avoiding the harsh winters; she found any permanent resting place impractical. She spent summers in Wisconsin or Michigan, and winters in Florida, Texas, or California. Although her health failed her, she kept busy with correspondence and "read with keen interest".

== Death ==
Porter caught a chill at Christmas in 1887 that developed into pneumonia. She died at the age of 80 on January 1, 1888, in Santa Barbara, California. Memorial services were held in Chicago on January 17. People from all walks of life shared recollections of Eliza Chappell Porter.

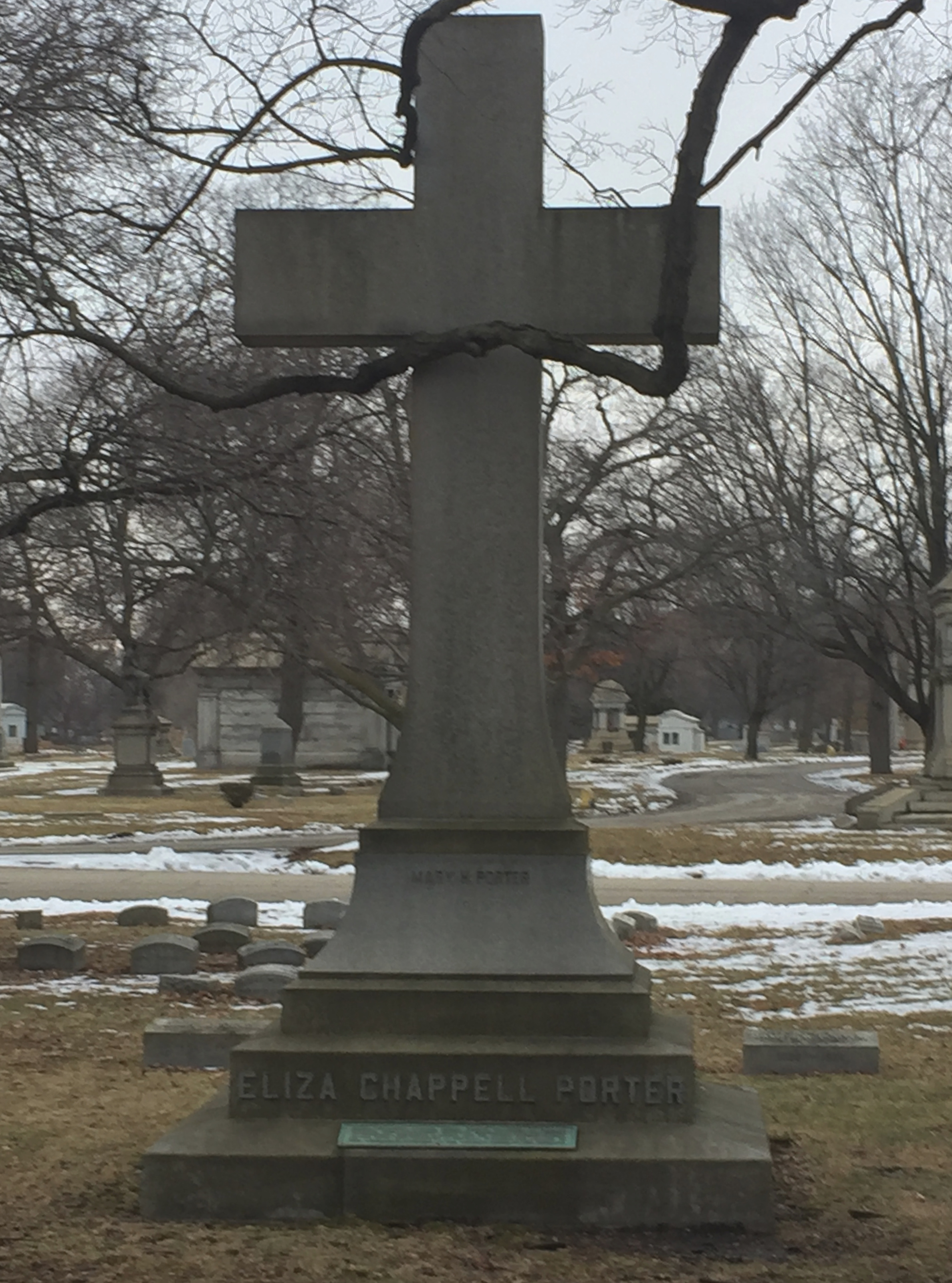
Porter's grave at Rosehill Cemetery

Hers was distinctively a pioneer work; and she had in large measure the inventive and organizing faculties requisite for that. She was always reaching out after the as yet unattempted good. She was an enthusiast in new, better methods. ... To the end, hers was the attitude of a learner.

— F. B. Perkins, Memorial for publication, January 21, 1888

Mary Livermore — a fellow member of the U.S. Sanitary Commission, journalist, and women's-rights advocate—remarked of the "uniform gentleness and untiring diligence that characterized her", noting "What a power she was in the hospitals" and "It seems to me that her biography, like that of our Lord, may be condensed into one phrase, 'she went about doing good'."

Jeremiah remained active, giving lectures to large crowds up until just before his own passing in 1893.

Porter is buried at Rosehill Cemetery in Chicago.

== Children ==
Porter had nine children; six reached adulthood. Eliza gave birth to her first child at the age of 28, and her last baby boy at 44. When Porter's youngest child was five, she set up an elementary school on their property where all were welcome. When the children got older, they were sent to boarding school.

== Eliza Chappell School ==
The Eliza Chappell Elementary School, located at 2135 West Foster Avenue in Chicago, was built in 1937 and is named in honor of Porter. The school, formerly known as the Foster and Leavitt site, was named on October 20, 1937, with Elvira Fox as the elected principal. A plaque was placed in Porter's honor at the southwest corner of State and Wacker Streets, acknowledging the first public school in Chicago in 1833.

== Sources ==
- More Than Petticoats: Woman's Work in the Civil War. Greta Anderson. Guilford, Conn: TwoDot. 2004. ISBN 0-7627-2529-X.
- L. P. Brockett & Mary C. Vaughan (1867). Woman's work in the civil war: a record of heroism, patriotism and patience. Philadelphia: Zeigler, McCurdy & Co.
- Coles, David J.; McPherson, James M.; Heidler, David Stephen; Heidler, Jeanne T. (2000). Encyclopedia of the American Civil War: a political, social, and military history. New York: W.W. Norton & Co. ISBN 0-393-04758-X.
- Herma Naomi Clark (1941). The elegant eighties, when Chicago was young. Chicago, Ill: A.C. McClurg & Co.
- Porter, Mary H. (1892). Eliza Chappell Porter: A Memoir. Fleming H. Revell. OL 7208554M.
- "Educational Enterprise in Chicago". Chicago Daily Tribune. June 24, 1900. p. 36.
- "Eliza Emily Chappell Porter". Encyclopædia Britannica. 2009.
- "Group Will Dedicate Eliza Porter Plaque". Chicago Daily Tribune. October 4, 1954. p. B17.
- "Pageant to Tell City's Dramatic Story Sept. 16". Chicago Daily Tribune. (1872–1963) September 7, 1934. Proquest Historical Newspapers Chicago Tribune. (1849–1986), p. 10.
- "Rev. Jeremiah Porter, Chicago’s First Moral Crusader". The Chicago Crime Scenes Project. March 31, 2009. June 8, 2009.
- Carol Kramer. "School Name Pays Homage to Early Chicago Teacher". Chicago Tribune. September 16, 1965. Proquest Historical Newspapers Chicago Tribune (1849–1986), p. N1.
- Winslow, Charles S. (August 1, 1939). Outline History of Chicago Public Schools. C.S. Winslow.
- Elizabeth Leonard. Yankee Women: Gender Battles in the Civil War. New York: W.W. Norton, 1994, p. 45.
- Glennette Tilley Turner. "Underground Railroad". The Encyclopedia of Chicago. Retrieved June 7, 2009.
- Jane E. Schultz. Women at the Front: Hospital Workers in Civil War America. Chapel Hill: University of North Carolina Press, 2004, p. 77.
- John L. Rury. "Schools and Education". The Encyclopedia of Chicago. Retrieved June 7, 2009.
- Julia Pferdehirt. "History Alive! The Underground Railroad in Wisconsin". Teaching With Stories.com Retrieved June 17, 2009.
- Norman Rozeff. Civilizing "The Frontier - The Porters". Cameron County Historical Commission. April 2008. Retrieved June 8, 2009.
- Robert McHenry. Famous American Women: A Biographical Dictionary From Colonial Times to the Present. New York: Dover, 1983, p. 193.
- Sheila Wolfe. "City's History Can Be Traced at Rosehill". Chicago Daily Tribune. (1872–1963) July 27, 1959. Proquest Historical Newspapers Chicago Tribune (1849–1986), p. 20.
- Therese Quinn. "An Introduction to CPS: CPS is the Third-Largest School System in the U.S. and the Second-Largest employer in the City". Area Chicago. Retrieved June 8, 2009.
- "Called to Her Rest". Chicago Inter Ocean. January 2, 1888. p. 4 – via Newspapers.com.
