= Battle of Queenston Heights =

1812 battle of the War of 1812

- Part of the War of 1812
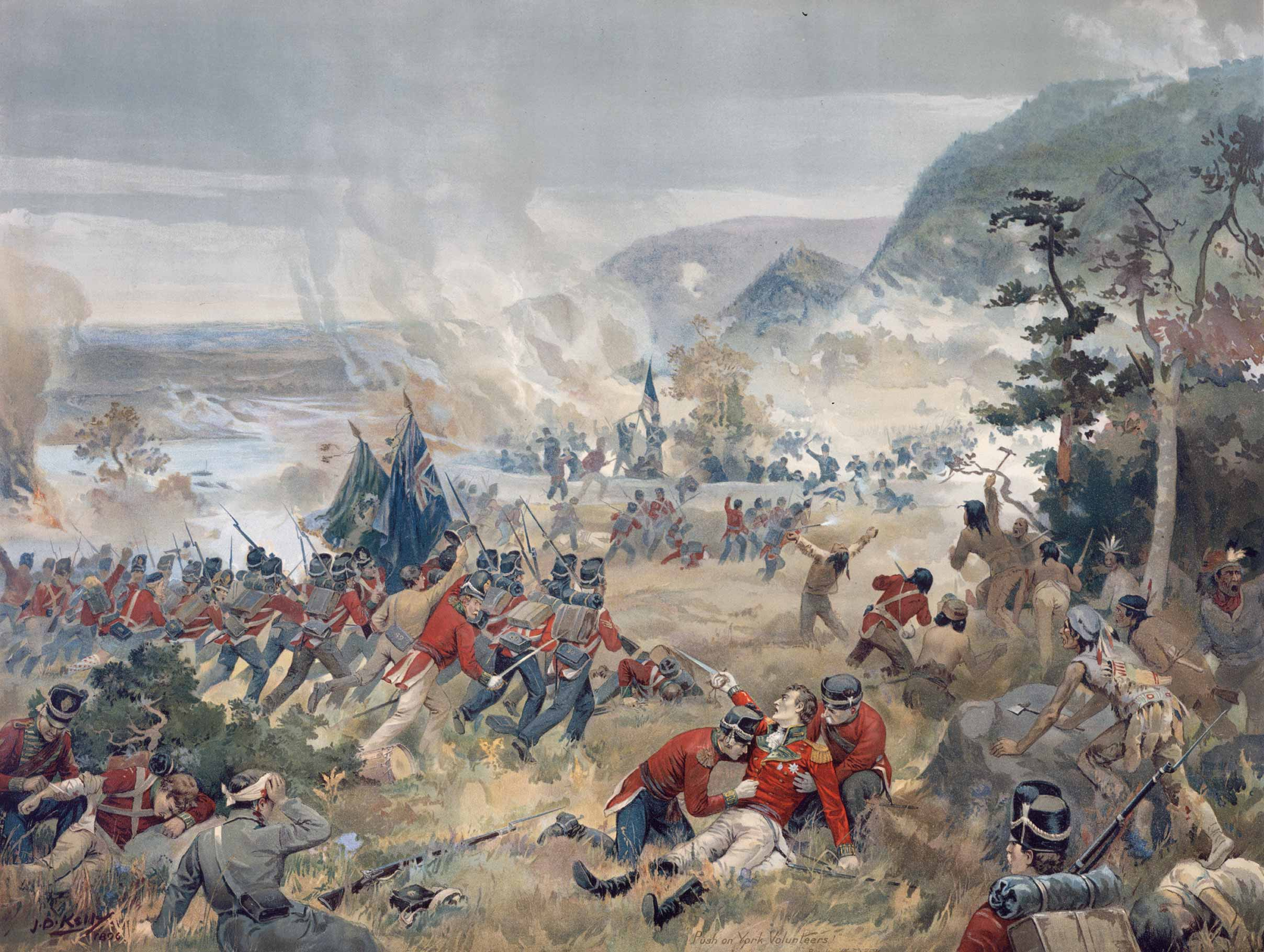
- 1896 painting of the battle
Date	13 October 1812
Location	Queenston, Upper Canada 43°9′43″N 79°3′2″W
Result	British-Mohawk victory

Belligerents
United Kingdom; Upper Canada; Mohawk	United States

Commanders and leaders
Isaac Brock †; Roger Hale Sheaffe; John Macdonell †	Stephen Van Rensselaer; Winfield Scott (surrendered); William Wadsworth (surrendered)

Strength
1,366	3,550

Casualties and losses
21 killed; 85 wounded; 22 captured	60–100 killed; 80 wounded; 955 captured

The Battle of Queenston Heights was the first major engagement of the War of 1812. The battle took place on 13 October 1812, at Queenston in Upper Canada (now Ontario) and was a decisive British victory. United States regulars and New York militia led by Major General Stephen Van Rensselaer crossed the Niagara River from Lewiston and engaged British regulars and Canadian militia led by Major General Isaac Brock. Major General Roger Hale Sheaffe took command of British forces after Brock was killed. Mohawk warriors led by John Norton supported the British during the battle.

The battle was an American attempt to establish a foothold on the Canadian side of the Niagara River before campaigning ended with the onset of winter. The British victory was mainly due to the poorly managed American offensive. Despite their numerical advantage and the widely dispersed British forces defending the Niagara frontier, the Americans were unable to get the bulk of their invasion force across the Niagara River because of British artillery and the reluctance of the inexperienced American militia. As a result, British reinforcements arrived, defeated the unsupported American forces, and forced a surrender. The battle is considered historically significant mainly due to the loss of the British commander.

== Background ==
The United States invasion across the Niagara River was originally intended to be part of a four-pronged attack on Upper and Lower Canada. Brigadier General William Hull would attack Amherstburg from Detroit, Major General Van Rensselaer would attack across the Niagara River, another attack would cross Lake Ontario to take Kingston, and Major General Henry Dearborn, the commander-in-chief of the United States Army, would use the Lake Champlain route to capture Montreal. These attacks were expected to bring the two British colonies to their knees and ensure a quick victory.

The attacks failed or were never launched. Hull was besieged at Detroit and, fearing a massacre by Britain's Indigenous allies, surrendered Fort Detroit and his entire command on 13 August. Meanwhile, Dearborn and his forces remained inactive at Albany, New York and seemed to be in no hurry to attack Kingston or Montreal.

Van Rensselaer was unable to launch an attack across the Niagara River in the summer of 1812 due to the lack of men and supplies. Although he held the rank of major general in the New York state militia he had also never commanded soldiers in battle. Van Rensselaer was considered the leading Federalist candidate for the governorship of New York. Hoping to get Van Rensselaer out of the way, New York governor Daniel Tompkins had put Van Rensselaer's name forward to command the army on the Niagara. Van Rensselaer officially took command on 13 July 1812. He secured the appointment of his second cousin, Lieutenant Colonel Solomon Van Rensselaer, as his aide-de-camp. Solomon van Rensselaer was an experienced soldier who had been wounded at the Battle of Fallen Timbers in 1794, and was a valuable source of advice to his cousin.

== Prelude ==
=== British moves ===
Major General Isaac Brock was both the civil administrator of Upper Canada and the commander of the military forces there. He was an aggressive commander, and his successful capture of Detroit in August 1812 had won him praise, the reputation as the "Saviour of Upper Canada" and a knighthood, the news of which would not reach Upper Canada until after his death. His superior at Quebec, Lieutenant General Sir George Prevost, was of a more cautious bent, and the two clashed over strategy.

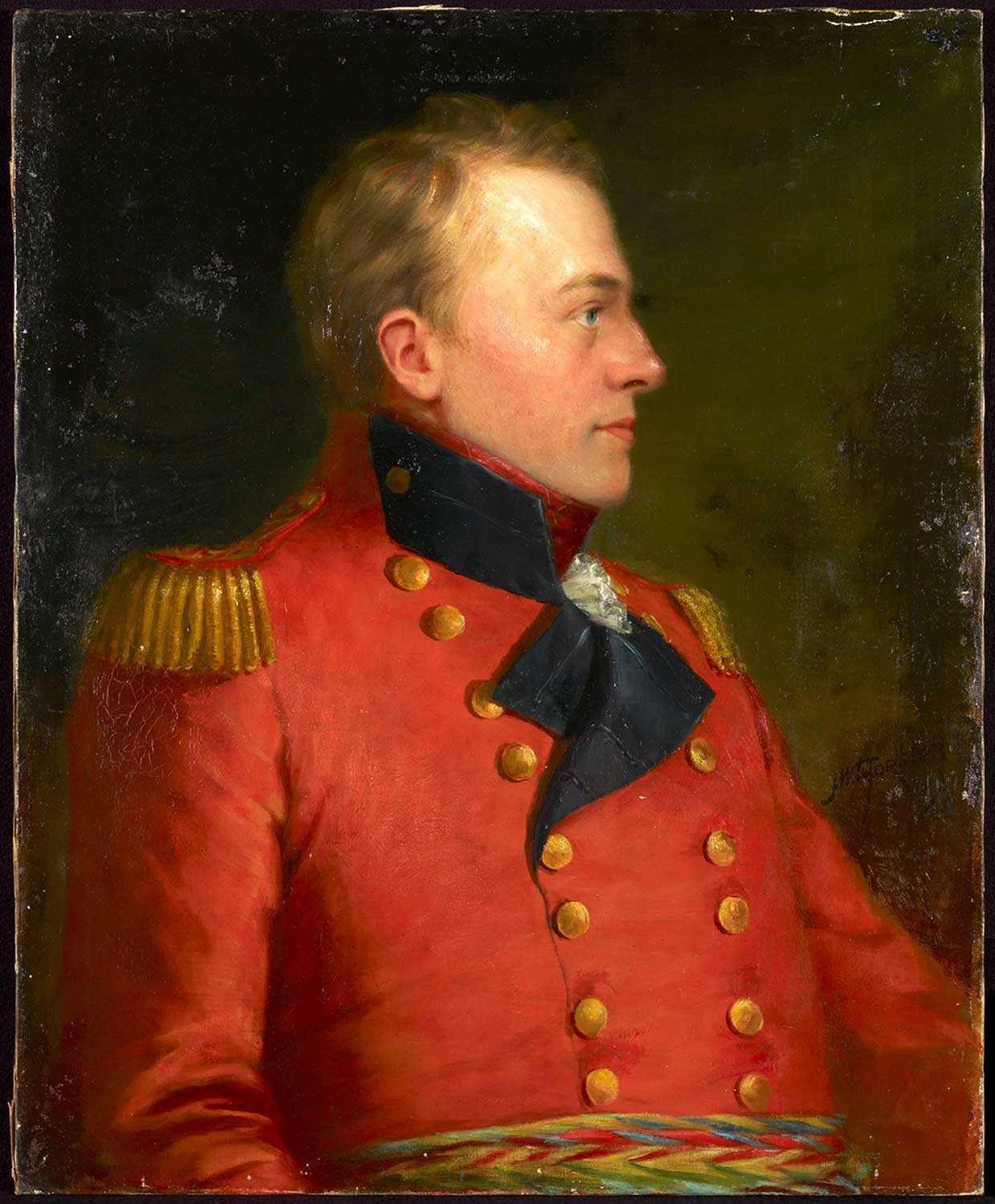
Major General Isaac Brock led a force made up of British regulars and Canadian militia during the Battle of Queenston Heights.

After his victory at Detroit, Brock had hastened back east, planning to cross the Niagara River and attack Van Rensselaer before he could be reinforced. Prevost, however, vetoed this plan and ordered Brock to behave more defensively. Not only was Prevost concerned by Brock's apparently rash actions, but he was also aware that the British Government had revoked the Orders in Council which had hampered American trade with France, thus removing one of the stated causes of the war. Provost believed that peace negotiations might ensue and did not wish to prejudice any talks by taking offensive action. He opened talks with Major General Dearborn, who agreed to an informal armistice. President Madison rejected Dearborn’s action and ordered him "to proceed with the utmost vigor in your operations." Hostilities resumed on 4 September.

While Brock had been at Detroit, Major General Sheaffe had been in command of the troops on the Niagara frontier. Acting under Prevost's orders, Sheaffe had negotiated an armistice with Lieutenant Colonel Van Rensselaer on 20 August, and had voluntarily restricted the movement of British troops and supplies. Brock returned to Niagara on 22 August, to find the armistice in effect. The terms of the armistice permitted the use of the river by both powers as a common waterway and the British could only watch as American reinforcements and supplies arrived. When the truce ended, Major General Van Rensselaer's forces were in much better shape than they had been previously.

=== American moves ===
The only significant American military presence along the Niagara River before June 1812 had been a company of artillery at Fort Niagara. In early June, a regiment of 600 militia volunteers commanded by Lieutenant Colonel Philetus Swift was dispatched to reinforce the garrison and establish camps at Black Rock and Lewiston. In early July, and additional 400 regulars and 1,200 militia arrived under the command of Brigadier General William Wandsworth. When Van Rensselaer arrived in mid-August this number had been reduced to roughly 1,400 due to sickness, desertions and furloughs, however, additional soldiers and artillery continued to arrive over the next several weeks. By the end of September, a brigade of 1,200 regulars under the command Brigadier General Alexander Smyth were encamped at Black Rock. The Canadian historian Robert Malcolmson has calculated that at the time of the battle, Van Rensselaer's army consisted of approximately 2,484 United States Army regulars, 4,070 New York militia and 160 Pennsylvania militia.

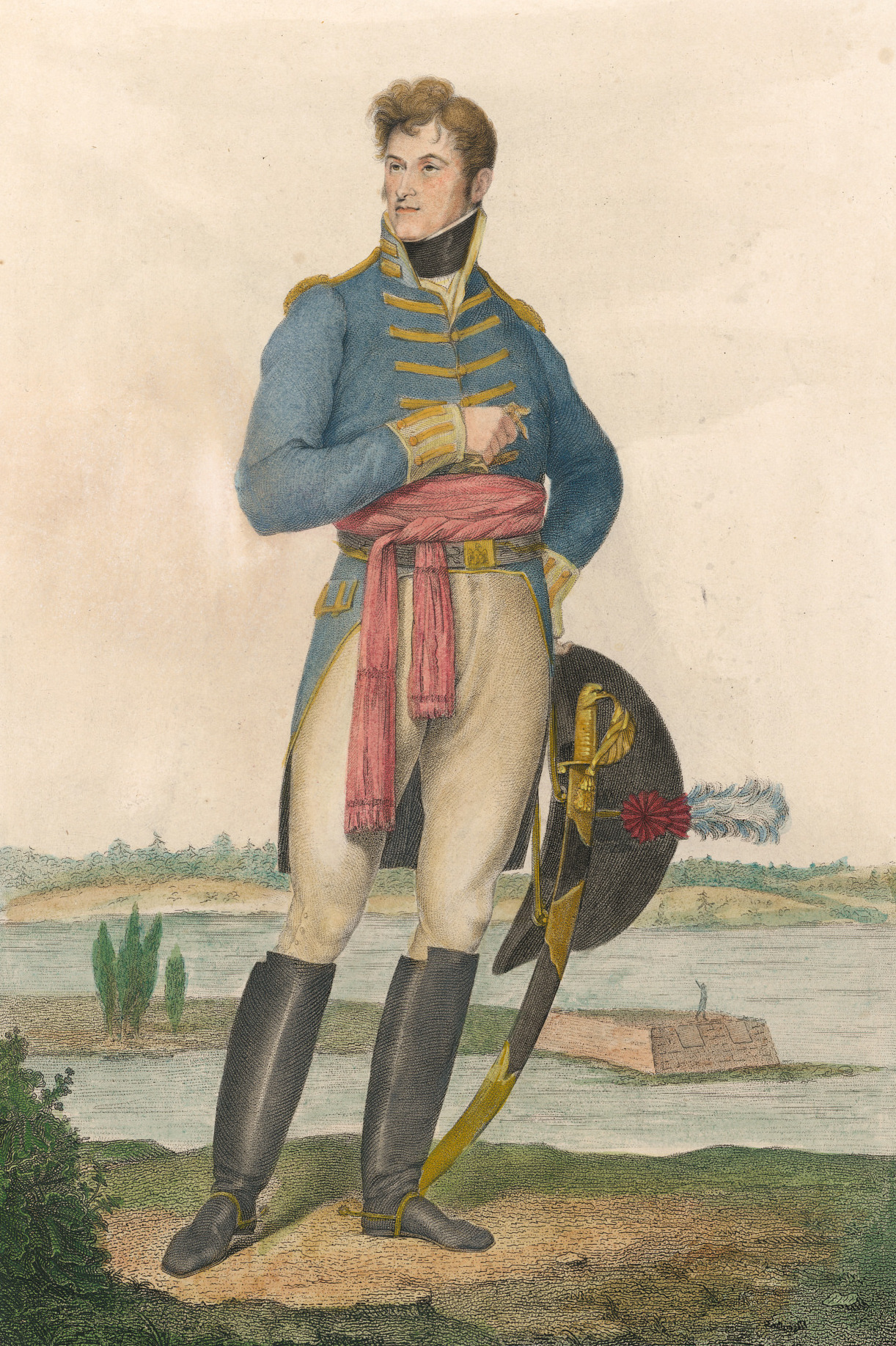
Major General Stephen Van Rensselaer commanded American forces at the Battle of Queenston Heights

Although Hull had failed at Detroit, and Dearborn had yet to make any move against Montreal or Kingston, Van Rensselaer was convinced he had the strength to invade Upper Canada. He planned to cross the Niagara River from Lewiston and take the heights above Queenston, while Smyth crossed the river near Fort Niagara and captured Fort George. Smyth, however, failed to attend a council of officers in early October to plan the attack. Although a lawyer by trade, Smyth was a regular officer who refused to acknowledge that Van Rensselaer outranked him. Van Rensselaer, an amiable politician in a hurry to launch the invasion, chose to proceed with the attack from Lewiston only. His goal was to establish a fortified bridgehead around Queenston, where he could maintain his army in winter quarters while planning for a campaign in the spring.

On 9 October, American sailors, artillerymen, and volunteers from the militia, commanded by Lieutenant Jesse Elliot, launched a successful boarding attack on the brigs Caledonia and Detroit, anchored near Fort Erie at the head of the Niagara River. Both brigs were captured, although Detroit subsequently ran aground and was set on fire to prevent it being recaptured. Brock feared this might presage an attack by Smyth from Black Rock and galloped to Fort Erie. He soon realized that there was no immediate danger from Smyth, and returned to his headquarters in Niagara that night. It was mistakenly reported to Van Rensselaer that Brock had left in haste for Detroit.

Van Rensselaer decided to launch his attack in the early hours of 11 October, even though Colonel Solomon Van Rensselaer, who was to lead the attack's first wave, was ill. Van Rensselaer sent orders to Smyth to march his brigade to Lewiston in preparation for the attack "with every possible dispatch." Smyth's brigade set out upon receipt of the letter, however, because of foul weather, the route to Lewiston was so bad that abandoned wagons could be seen "sticking in the road." The same weather drenched Van Rensselaer's men at Lewiston as they waited to embark. The officer in charge of the boats is alleged to have rowed his boat away and deserted the army, taking with him most of the oars. By the time the oars could be replaced, the attack had to be postponed.

When Smyth received word that the attack had been delayed, he ordered his men back to their camp at Black Rock, rather than press on to Lewiston. He wrote to Van Rensselaer on 12 October that his brigade would not be in condition to move out again until 14 October. Van Rensselaer, however, had decided that a second attempt would be made on 13 October.

=== Advanced warning ===
Major Thomas Evans was prevented by an American officer from landing in order to arrange a prisoner exchange on 12 October.

Brock was aware of the failed American attempt to cross the Niagara River at Queenston on 11 October but believed it may have been a feint to distract him from a major attack elsewhere. On 12 October Brock's brigade major, Major Thomas Evans, crossed the Niagara River under a flag of truce to request an exchange of prisoners taken in Elliot's raid on the British brigs three days before. Evans attempted to see Colonel Solomon Van Rensselaer but was told that he was ill. Instead, he was met by a man who called himself Toock, who claimed to be Stephen Van Rensselaer's secretary. Toock, who was probably Van Rensselaer's secretary Major John Lovett, repeatedly insisted that no exchange could be arranged for at least several days. Evans was struck by the repetition of this phrase and had also spotted several boats hidden under bushes along the shore. He deduced that a crossing was planned for 13 October, but when Evans returned to the British lines a gathering of officers responded to his theory with skepticism. Brock, however, took Evans aside and after a private conversation became convinced of the possibility. He instructed his officers to be ready for immediate action and sent dispatch riders to warn nearby militia commanders.

== Battle ==
=== British dispositions ===
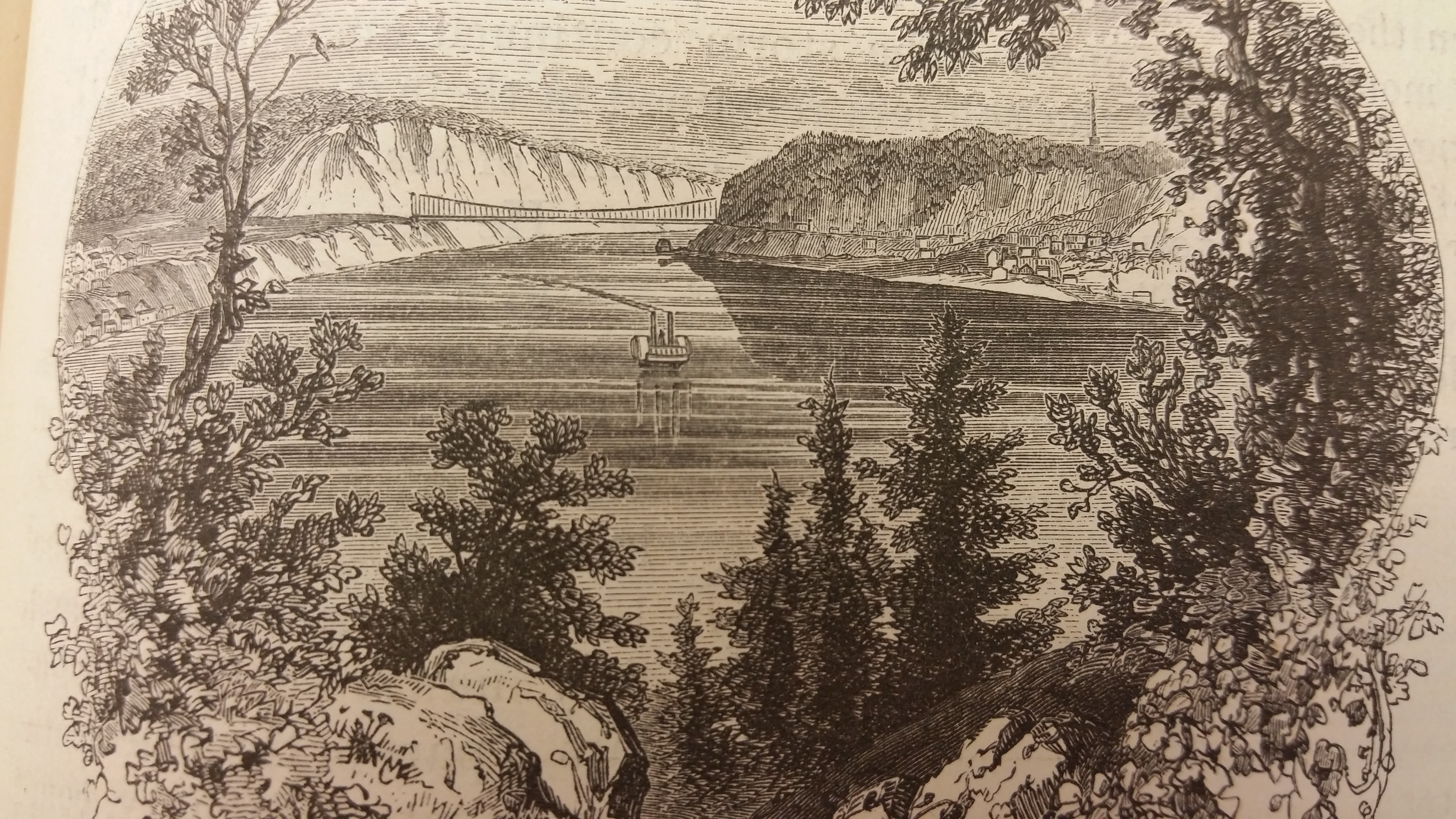
The British positioned a 12-pounder gun and a 18-pounder carronade at Vrooman's Point, a mile north of Queenston. Boats crossing from Lewiston to Queenston were beyond the range of the carronade and at the maximum range of the gun.

The village of Queenston is located on the west side of the Niagara River at the north end of the Niagara Gorge. In 1812, it was home to roughly 300 inhabitants and 20 scattered dwellings surrounded by gardens and orchards. A wharf and stone guardhouse had been constructed in 1791. South of the village, the ground rose 300 feet (91 m) to the promontory known as Queenston Heights. The slope from the river to the heights was steep but overgrown with shrubs and trees, making it possible to climb. The river was fast-flowing and roughly 200 yards (180 m) wide but was described as being "little trouble to even an indifferent oarsman."

Queenston was protected by 450 regulars and militia under the command of Captain James Dennis. In the village was Dennis's grenadier company of the 49th Regiment of Foot, the two flank companies of the 2nd Regiment of York Militia, the two flank companies of the 5th Regiment of Lincoln Militia, and a ten-man detachment from the 41st Regiment of Foot. A 9-pounder gun had been positioned near the guardhouse, and an 18-pounder gun and 8-inch mortar were positioned in a redan two-thirds of the way up the escarpment above Queenston. The guns were manned by members of the 1st Lincoln Artillery, supervised by a small detachment of Royal Artillery personnel. The light company of the 49th Regiment under Captain John Williams protected the redan.

A 12-pounder gun and a 18-pounder carronade, also manned by the 1st Lincoln Artillery, were sited at Vrooman's Point, a mile north of the village, while a 9-pounder gun and a second 18-pound carronade were at Brown's Point two miles further to the north. These positions were guarded by the two flank companies of the 3rd Lincoln.

An additional 260 regulars and 300 militia were based at Fort George ten miles to the north. Nearby was an encampment of the Six Nations of the Grand River that could field 160 warriors, while at Chippewa to the south were 150 members of the 41st Regiment and 100 militia from the 2nd Lincoln.

=== American landing ===
"The grape and musket balls, poured upon them at close quarters as they approached the shore, made incredible havoc. A single discharge from a field-piece directed by Captain Dennis himself (the captain of the 49th Grenadiers) killed fifteen in one boat."

— Lieutenant John Beverley Robinson of the 3rd Regiment of York Militia

Queenston was attacked by the 6th, 13th, and 23rd Infantry Regiments. Joining the attack were the 16th, 17th, 18th, 19th, and 20th Regiments of New York Militia, supported by a detachment of volunteer riflemen. Van Rensselaer's plan called for 900 regulars and 2,650 militia to cross the river. The Americans had twelve batteaux, each of which could carry thirty men, and two larger batteaux which were fitted with platforms on which field guns or wagons could be carried. The first wave of the boats would carry 40 artillerymen, 150 militia, and 150 regulars. Lieutenant Colonel Van Rensselaer would lead the militia contingent while Lieutenant Colonel John Chrystie of the 13th U.S. Infantry would lead the regulars.

The invasion was supported the 2nd Artillery Regiment, commanded by Lieutenant Colonel Winfield Scott, two companies of the New York State Militia Artillery, and an artillery detachment from Fort Niagara. Two 18-pounder guns had been placed in an earthwork named "Fort Gray" on Lewiston Heights with a mortar located nearby. Scott's two 6-pounder field guns were positioned just south of the village of Lewiston several hundred yards north of the embarkation point.

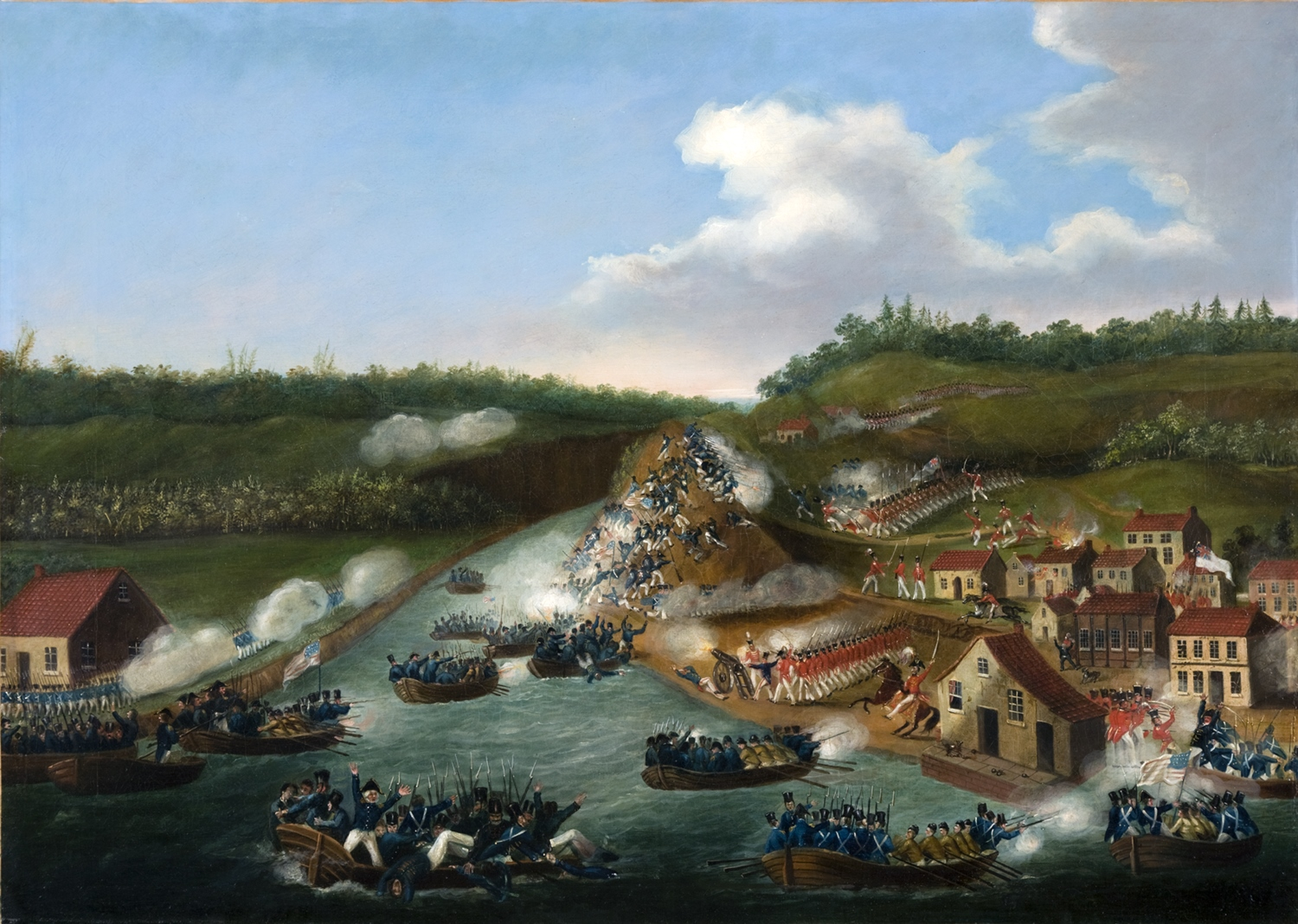
The Battle of Queenston Heights by eyewitness James B. Dennis, depicts the American landing on 13 October 1812. The village of Queenston is in the right foreground, with Queenston Heights behind. Lewiston is in the left foreground

The Americans began crossing the river a few hours before dawn on 13 October. Three of the boats, including Chrystie's, struggled against the current and returned to the American side of the river. The remaining ten boats under Lieutenant Colonel van Rensselaer approached the narrow gravel beach south of the village. British guards spotted the boats as they approached and opened fire before hastening to the village to spread the alarm. After landing, the Americans climbed the riverbank, formed a column and began advancing towards the village, but were met by a detachment of British regulars and militia under the command of Captain Dennis. During the intense firefight that followed, Lieutenant Colonel Van Rensselaer was hit in the thigh by a musket ball then hit five more times in the heel, thighs and calf. Although he survived, he spent the rest of the battle out of action, weak from loss of blood. Captain John E. Wool of the 13th U.S. Infantry, who had also been wounded, took over command. Wool pulled his men back to the landing point while Dennis withdrew back to the village.

Meanwhile, the British artillery opened fire on the boats and embarkation point, while the American artillery attempted to silence the British guns. As a second wave of boats started across the river, the crews of three of them, one of which was carrying Chrystie, panicked when they came under fire and turned back. One of the others was sunk by the British 9-pounder in the village but as dawn approached, American artillery fire disabled the gun.

A number of boats carrying Lieutenant Colonel John Fenwick (formerly the commandant at Fort Niagara) and 80 men came under intense fire they landed at Hamilton Cove at the north end of the village. Captain Dennis moved quickly to prevent the Americans from establishing a foothold by rushing more of the 49th and the militia to the cove, while Captain William's company moved down from the redan to the south end of village. During the fierce engagement, Fenwick was hit at least three times including once in the eye. General Van Rensellaer's aide-de-camp, Major John Lovett, wrote that Fenwick was "clothed with bullets." With their boats' hulls perforated from musket fire, and with many of their comrades killed or wounded, Fenwick's detachment quickly surrendered. One officer and five other men managed to escape in a boat carrying six of the wounded.

Meanwhile, Captain Peter Oglivie with the rest of the 13th Infantry had crossed the river and reinforced Van Rensellaer and Wool. Before Van Rensellaer was evacuated with the wounded, he ordered Wool and Oglivie to head upstream, climb the heights and storm the redan battery. Lieutenant John Gansevoort who had been posted at Fort Niagara before the war and knew the area, was ordered to guide them.

=== Death of Isaac Brock ===
At Niagara, Brock had been awakened by the noise of the artillery at Queenston. Although he thought the attack might only be a diversion, he decided to ride there immediately, followed shortly afterwards by his aides, Lieutenant Colonel John Macdonnell and Captain John Glegg. At Brown's Point he encountered the detachment of the 3rd York preparing to march to Queenston and urged them onwards. He briefly stopped at Vrooman's Point, and after learning that the enemy was out of range of the carronade, continued galloping towards Queenston where he arrived shortly after dawn. By this time, Wool and Oglivie had ascended the heights and concealed by the forest had moved into position behind the redan. Without Captain Williams's company to protect them, the artillerymen fled as soon as the Americans emerged from the trees. Brock immediately dispatched a message to Major General Sheaffe at Fort George, ordering him to send reinforcements.

c. 1908 illustration of Brock's death

Brock resolved to retake the redan without waiting for reinforcements. At the foot of the escarpment he assembled a body of men from Williams's company and from the flank companies of the 2nd York and 5th Lincoln, and placing himself at the head of the soldiers from the 49th, led them up the slope in a frontal attack against the redan. Brock was struck in the wrist by a musket ball but continued upwards towards the enemy. His height, energetic gestures, and officer's uniform made him an obvious target. An American soldier stepped forward from a thicket and fired at the general from a range of barely 50 yards (46 m). The ball struck Brock in the chest, killing him almost instantly. While the British continued their attack, several men, supervised by Captain Glegg, carried Brock's body from the field and hid in a house diagonally opposite the home of Laura Secord. Williams then pulled everyone back into the forested area west of the redan where he was joined by Lieutenant Colonel Macdonell and the detachment of the 3rd York from Vrooman's Point.

Although he was lawyer by trade with little military experience, Lieutenant Colonel Macdonell led a second attempt, together with Williams, to retake the redan. Macdonell and Williams slowly advanced through the shelter of trees until they were about 30 yards (27 m) from the enemy, unaware that Wool and Oglivie had been reinforced. The 49th and 3rd York charged forward and began pushing the Americans back. Someone at the redan panicked and spiked the 18-pounder, however, the battle's momentum turned when a musket ball hit Macdonell's mount, causing it to rear and twist around. A second shot hit Macdonell in the small of the back, causing him to fall from his horse. At the same time, Williams was knocked unconscious by a musket ball that grazed his skull. As the British attack faltered, the Americans pressed forward and took 21 prisoners. Williams, who despite his wound had regained consciousness, retreated with the rest of his men to the village, bringing with them the mortally wounded Macdonell down to Queenston. Captain Dennis then ordered his forces to abandon Queenston and pull back to Durham's Farm near Vrooman's Point.

According to popular legend, Brock's last words were "Push on, brave York Volunteers," however, the consensus among most historians and biographers is that the general died without saying a word. Forensic analysis of his uniform coat (now in the collection of the Canadian War Museum) and the eyewitness account of George Jarvis, support this theory.

Jarvis, a gentleman volunteer with the 49th Regiment wrote that Brock:

...fell on his left side, within a few feet of where I stood. Running up to him I enquired, " Are you much hurt, Sir ?" He placed his hand on his breast and made no reply, and slowly sunk down.

The location of the gunshot hole in the coat indicates that the projectile likely passed through Brock's sternum and ruptured his aorta and pulmonary arteries. Death would have been almost instantaneous and Brock would have been incapable of saying anything. It is possible, however, that Brock did say "Push on, brave York Volunteers," or words to that effect, as he passed the 3rd York at Brown's Point.

=== Midday ===
By mid-morning, the Americans were only opposed by the 12-pounder at Vrooman's Point which was at its maximum range. The Americans moved several hundred fresh reinforcements and a 6-pounder field gun across the river to the Queenston landing, then up to the heights. They unspiked the 18-pounder in the redan but its field of fire on the west side of the river was limited. Meanwhile, American soldiers entered the village and began looting.

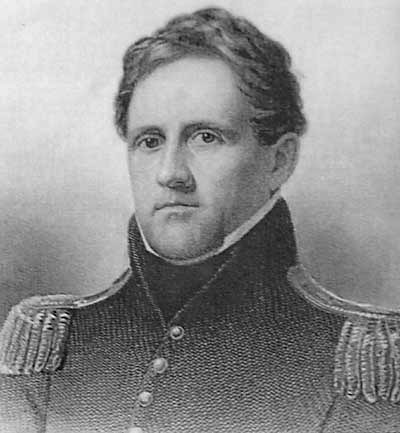
Lieutenant Colonel Winfield Scott was instructed to take command of the American forces that had captured Queenston Heights earlier in the day. Scott was taken prisoner when the Americans surrendered.

Lieutenant Colonel Chrystie finally succeeded in crossing to Queenston and briefly took command of the American troops on the heights. When Brigadier General William Wadsworth arrived, Chrystie returned to Lewiston to brief Van Rensselaer. Unaware that Wadsworth had crossed the river, Van Rensselaer had asked Lieutenant Colonel Winfield Scott of the 2nd Artillery to take command at Queenston Heights. When Scott arrived, Wadsworth, who was nominally present as a volunteer, waived his right to command and took charge of the militia. Scott's command consisted of a collection of unorganised detachments, some without their officers. Likewise, some officers had crossed the river but their men had refused to follow them. It has been calculated that roughly 1,350 American soldiers crossed the river on 13 October.

Sheaffe arrived at Durham's Farm in the mid-morning followed closely by the first of the British reinforcements from Fort George. A detachment of the Royal Artillery under Captain William Holcroft, with two 6-pounder guns and a 5.5 inch howitzer, advanced on the village, supported by a company of the 41st under Captain William Derenzy. Captain Alexander Hamilton of the Niagara Light Dragoons guided them to firing positions near his home overlooking the river. When the artillery opened fire it once again became hazardous for the American boats to cross the river. Two American boats were sunk, and the two 6-pounders near Lewiston were repeatedly silenced by shrapnel fire. Meanwhile, Derenzy slowly began pushing the Americans out of the village.

At the same time, Mohawk warriors from the Grand River under John Norton (Teyoninhokarawen) had climbed the escarpment well to the west of Queenston and were approaching Scott's position from the south. Norton encountered a militia scouting party that fled towards the safety of their line. A body of infantry moved forward to cover the patrol's retreat and exchanged fire with the Mohawk. Unwilling to mount a frontal attack, Norton headed west into the woods, then silently circled around to the north side of the American lines. Norton "discharged Leaden death among them" then pulled back to the west. In response Scott led several companies in a slow advance westwards, halting to deliver volleys before entering the woods. In the ensuing skirmish both the Mohawk and the Americans suffered casualties. Faced with mounting casualties, Scott's men began an orderly withdrawal back to their lines, while Norton continued to harass the Americans.

Major General Van Rensselaer finally crossed over to Queenston but did not ascend to the heights until after Scott had pulled back to the American lines. Van Rensselaer decided to return to Lewiston and arrange for ammunition and more men to be sent across. At the landing he witnessed a group of soldiers suddenly swarm a boat and shove off, desperate to reach the safety of the other side. In the aftermath of Norton's attack, a significant number of American soldiers had begun to abandon their posts, badly affected by the sight of the dead and wounded, and the war cries of the Mohawk.

After returning to the eastern shore, Van Rensselaer discovered that none of the militia were willing to cross the river. He later reported that "...to my utter astonishment, I found that at the very moment when complete victory was in our hands, the ardor of the unengaged troops had entirely subsided. I rode in all directions—urged men by every consideration to pass over—but in vain." He dispatched a message to Wadsworth and Scott which left the decision whether to stand and fight or retreat across the river to them, promising to send boats if the decision was made to withdraw.

=== Sheaffe's attack ===
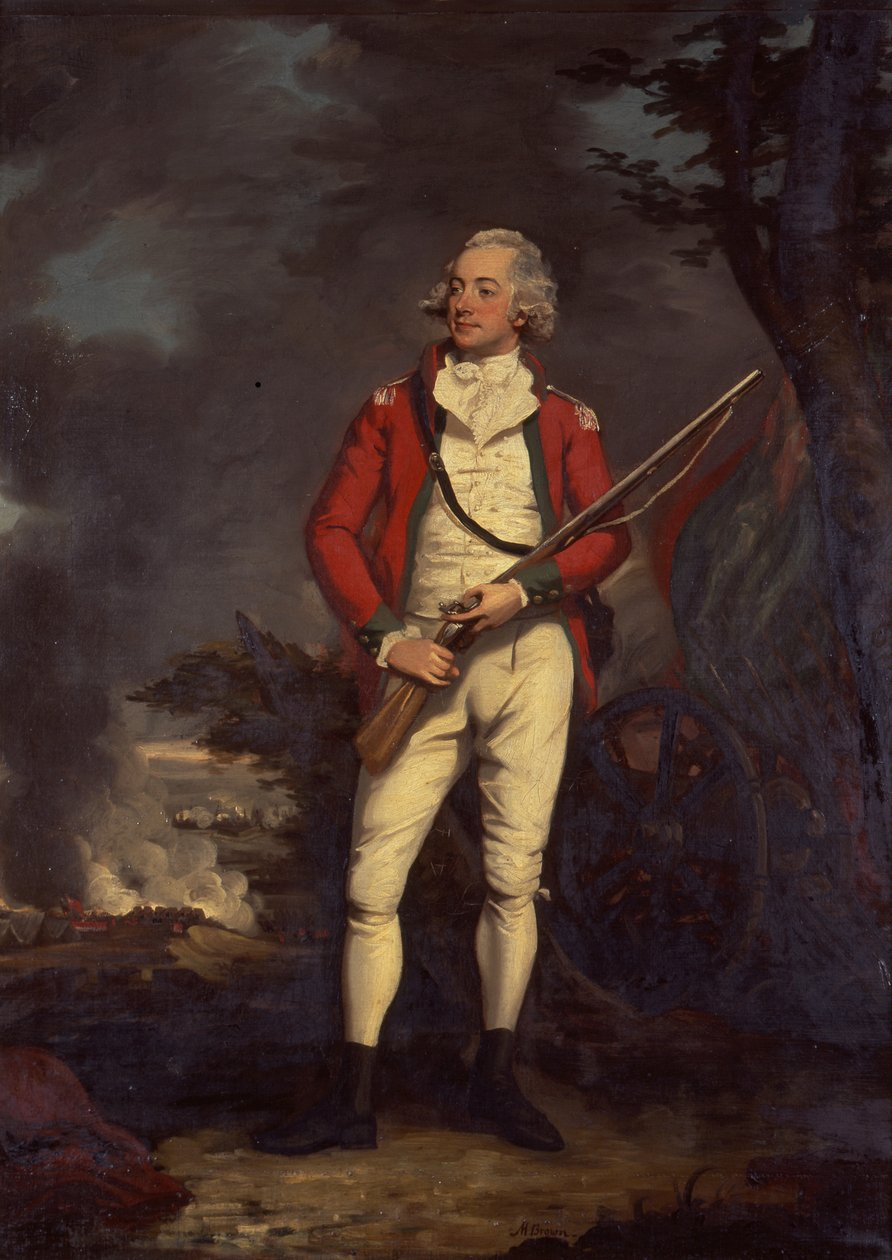
After Brock's death, Major General Roger Hale Sheaffe took charge of the remaining British regulars, Canadian militiamen, and Mohawk warriors.

At Durham's farm, additional reinforcements had arrived from Niagara. In addition to most of the force that had been in Queenston, Sheaffe now had at his disposal two more companies of the 41st Regiment; the flank companies of the 1st Lincoln, 4th Lincoln, and 1st York; Runchey's Coloured Company, and the Niagara Dragoons. An artillery detachment under Lieutenant William Crowther of the 41st arrived with two 3-pounder field guns transported by the Provincial Royal Artillery Drivers or "Car Brigade," a militia unit commanded by Captain Isaac Swayze and responsible for moving field guns and munitions during military engagements. Sheaffe sent a dispatch to Chippewa, ordering the three companies of the 41st Regiment and the flank companies of the 2nd Lincoln to march north and rendezvous with him to the south of the heights.

Sheaffe set out with approximately 650 men and marched across fields to ascend the escarpment about a mile west of Queenston. His forces then circled around to south, following the path that Norton had taken earlier. Sheaffe positioned the main body of his regulars facing north and directly in front of the American line at a distance of about 400 yards (370 m). The two light companies of regulars, Runchey's Coloured Company, and Norton's Mohawks moved into position west of the American position. When the reinforcement from Chippewa arrived, Sheaffe ordered them into position on his eastern flank.

Just after 3:00 p.m, Sheaffe gave the order to advance. His regulars marched forward to within 100 yards (91 m) of the American line then volleyed en masse. The Americans volleyed in return then began to pull back. The British continued to advance by platoon, halting and firing as they did so, until they were exchanging point-blank fire with the retreating Americans. Meanwhile, the light companies, the Coloured Company and the Mohawks moved in from the west. While some of the Americans were able to make an orderly retreat towards the landing, others panicked and threw down their weapons or fell to the deaths trying to climb down the cliff. As they retreated they encountered many of those who had earlier abandoned the posts and had taken shelter among the trees along the river. They soon discovered that no boats were waiting to evacuate them. Some tried to swim to safety and were shot at. Scott wrote that it took three attempts with a flag of truce to surrender before the British finally ceased firing roughly an hour after the attack began.

=== Casualties ===
The British official casualty return gave 14 killed, 77 wounded, and 21 missing, not including casualties suffered by the Mohawk.. Malcomson, however, determined that the official return underestimated casualties and has calculated that the regulars and militia suffered 16 killed, 83 wounded, and 21 captured, with a further five killed, two wounded, and one captured among the Mohawk. Among the wounded was James Secord, the husband of Laura Secord.

The number of Americans killed in the battle has been variously estimated at between 60 and 100. Eighty‐two severely wounded Americans were evacuated across the Niagara before the surrender, of whom two died soon after. The British initially captured 955 Americans, including 120 severely wounded officers and men. This was more than the hospital at Niagara could accommodate, so some of them had to be cared for in the court house or in nearby churches. The number of the walking wounded, who were seen by the British surgeons and then kept with the other prisoners, has not been recorded. Of the severely wounded prisoners, 30 died within a few days. The report on prisoners issued on 15 October recorded 19 officers and 417 enlisted men from the regulars, and 54 officers and 435 other ranks from the militia. The 80 surviving wounded in the American hospital, and the 90 surviving wounded prisoners were presumably the basis for General Van Rensselaer's statement, in a letter to Dearborn on 20 October, that "the aggregate" of his information would indicate that 170 Americans had been wounded in the battle. This gives total American casualties of 60 to 100 killed, 80 wounded, 90 wounded prisoners and 835 other prisoners. Six officers (four regular and two militia) were among the killed; 11 officers (six regular and five militia) were among the wounded who escaped captured and eight officers (four regular and four militia) were among the wounded prisoners. Those captured included Brigadier General Wadsworth, Lieutenant Colonel Scott and four other lieutenant colonels. A 6-pounder gun and the colours of a New York Militia regiment were also captured.

== Aftermath ==
After the battle, Sheaffe proposed a temporary truce and invited Van Rensselaer to send surgeons to assist in treating the wounded. Within days all of the walking wounded as well as all of the militia prisoners were paroled and sent back across the river including Wadsworth. The regulars, including Scott and Chrystie, were sent down to Quebec and were exchanged at the end of November.

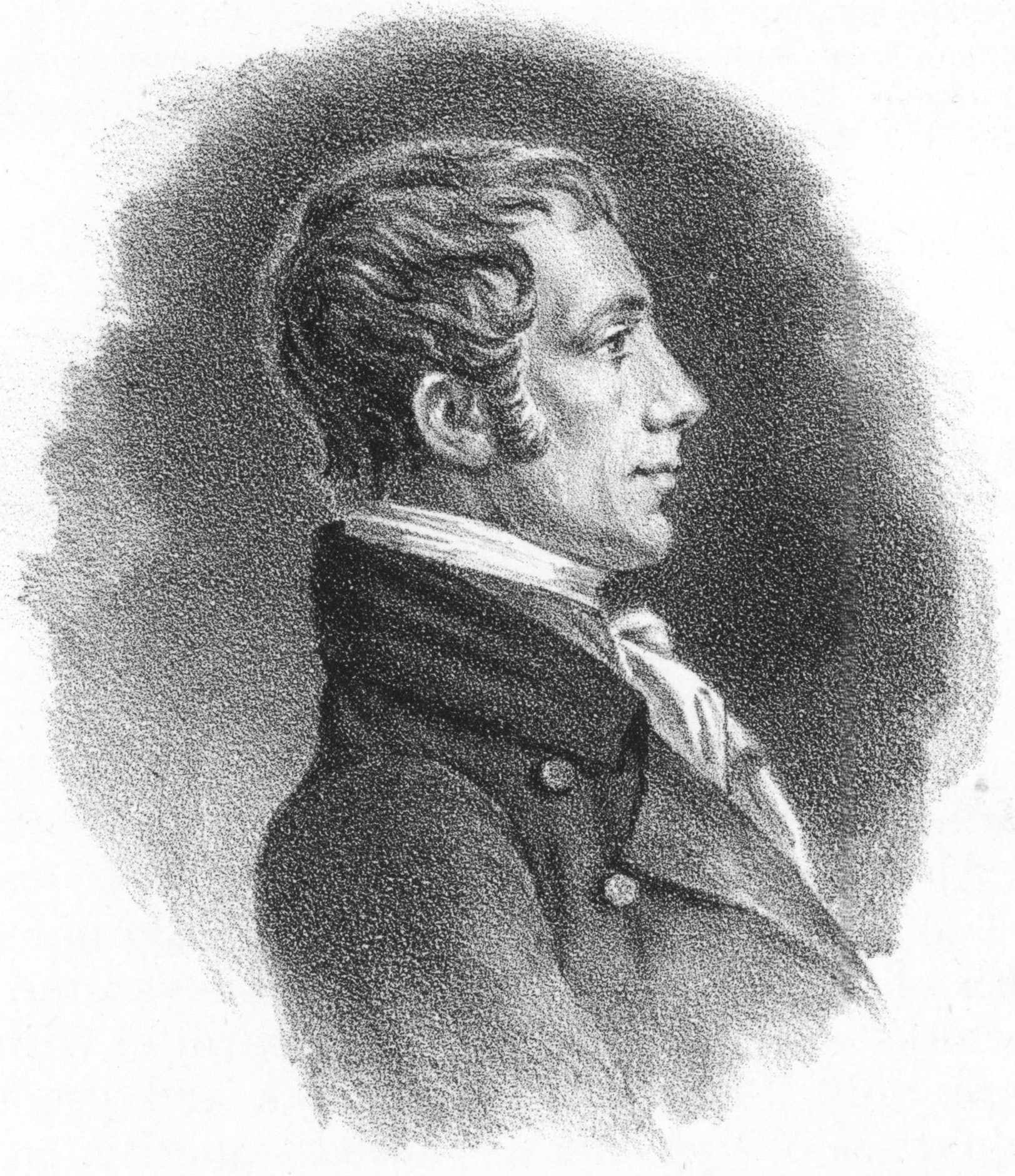
Brigadier General Alexander Smyth, the officer who refused to support Van Rensselaer's attack, succeeded him as commander of American forces on the Niagara River.

On 16 October, Van Rensselaer turned over command of his remaining forces to Alexander Smyth, the officer whose insolence had badly injured the invasion attempt. Smyth still had his regulars at Black Rock but refused to launch any attacks across the river until he had 3,000 men under his command. At the end of November, he launched a raid to prepare the ground for a full-scale invasion. Known as the Battle of Frenchman's Creek, the raid was successful, but two subsequent attempts to cross the river near Fort Erie were called off due to the arrival of British reinforcements, the lack of boats, and inclement weather. With his men suffering from illness and poor morale, and faced with desertions and a breakdown of discipline, Smyth requested a month's leave to visit his family, but failed to return from leave and was removed from the Army rolls three months later.

The question of who was to blame for the defeat was the subject of heated debate after the war. Stephen Van Rensselaer's popularity remained high enough that he was able to continue his attempt to unseat Daniel Tompkins as Governor of New York, and although he was unsuccessful, he later served in the United States House of Representatives. General John Armstrong, Jr., who became the Secretary of War in 1813, pinned the blame on the general in his Notices of the War of 1812, published in 1836. This provoked an indignant response from Solomon Van Rensselaer, who compared Armstrong to Benedict Arnold and laid the blame squarely on Lieutenant Colonel Chrystie (who had died of natural causes in July 1813). Van Rensselaer accused of Chrystie of cowardice and said "to his failure may mainly be attributed all our disasters."

Despite the victory, the loss of Major General Brock was a major blow to the British. Brock had inspired his own troops and the militia and civilian authorities in Upper Canada by his confidence and constant activity. Sheaffe, his successor, received a baronetcy for his part in the victory but did not command the same respect, and was known as a harsh disciplinarian. His success where Brock had rashly sacrificed himself could not help him escape censure for not having followed up the victory at Queenston Heights with an attack on Fort Niagara (which had been evacuated by its garrison after a bombardment from British batteries that afternoon). The following April, Sheaffe was defeated by a numerically superior American force at the Battle of York. Although his decision to retreat with his few regulars was accepted by his superiors (and his American opponents), it left the local militia, the Assembly of Upper Canada and the population of York feeling abandoned and aggrieved. Sheaffe was removed from his civil and military commands and later recalled to Britain.

== Legacy ==
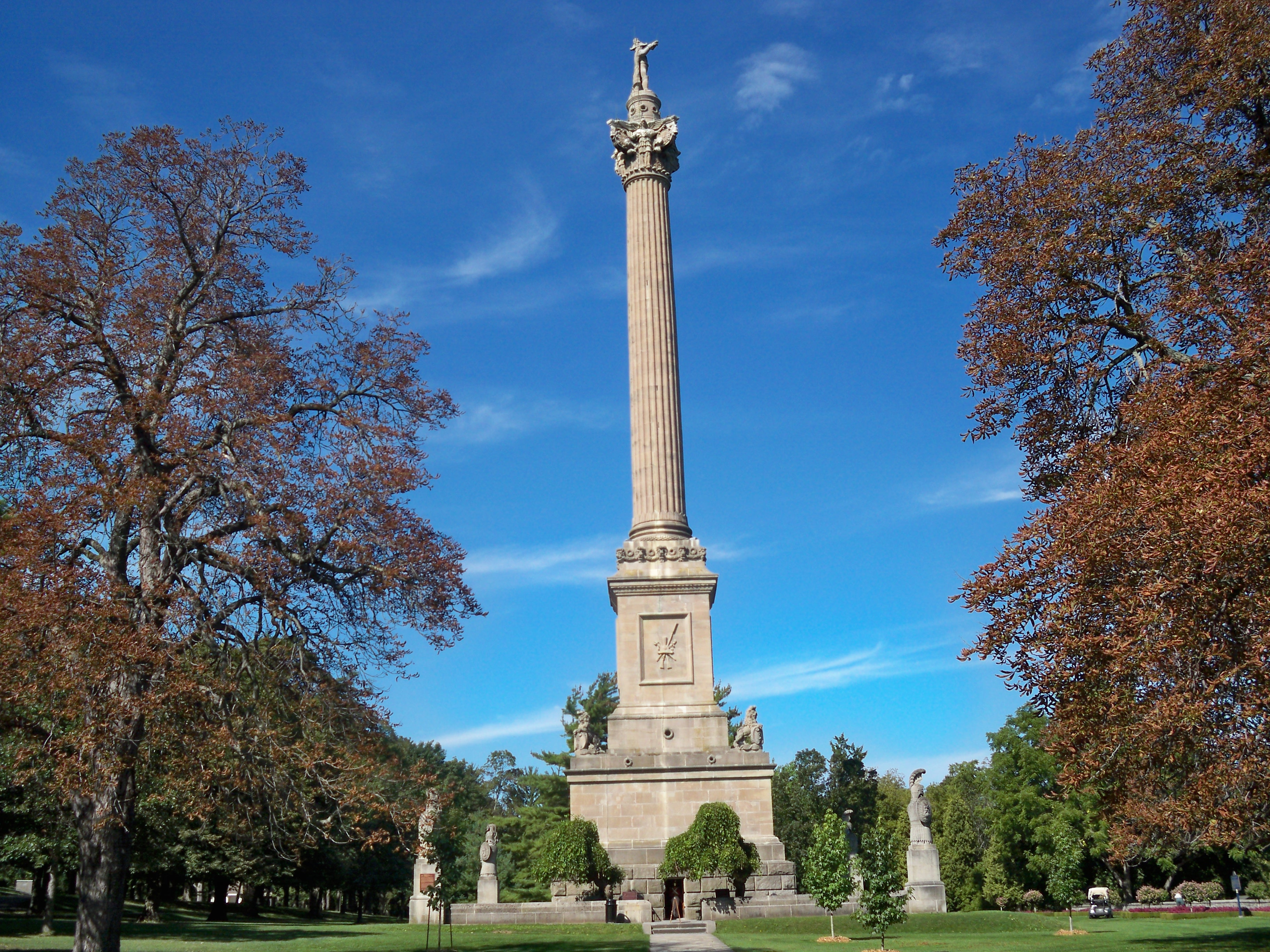
A 56-metre (185 foot) column, known as Brock's Monument was constructed atop Queenston Heights to commemorate the battle as well as Major General Isaac Brock.

A 56-metre (185 foot) column atop Queenston Heights, known as Brock's Monument, commemorates the battle as well as the memory of the British general who died there. Brock and Lieutenant-Colonel John Macdonell, are interred at the monument's base. The monument was built between 1853 and 1856 and replaced an earlier monument that was destroyed in 1840. Brock is further commemorated by a bust at the Valiants Memorial in Ottawa.

The misspelled battle honour "Queenstown" was awarded to the 41st Regiment of Foot and the 49th Regiment of Foot. Their successor units in the modern British Army are the Royal Welsh Regiment and The Rifles Regiments. In the Canadian Army, the Lincoln and Welland Regiment, the 56th Field Artillery Regiment, the Queen's York Rangers, and the Royal Hamilton Light Infantry perpetuate the history and heritage of the militia units that took part in the battle. These regiments also carry the Queenston battle honour.

Many poems and songs have been written about the battle. The song "MacDonnell on the Heights", was composed by Stan Rogers and included in Rogers's 1984 posthumous album From Fresh Water. The song commemorates the role of John Macdonell in the battle. In 1959, as an answer to Johnny Horton's hit record, "The Battle of New Orleans", Toronto radio station CHUM recorded "The Battle of Queenston Heights", with disk jockey Mike Darow on lead vocals. Credited to "Mike Darrow and the CHUMS", the number became a regional hit in its own right, reaching #17 on CHUM's own chart.

Brock University in St. Catharines, the city of Brockville, and several Ontario schools are named after Major General Brock, as are many municipal roads throughout Ontario. Ontario's Highway 405 that connects the Queenston-Lewiston International Bridge to the Queen Elizabeth Way was designated the General Brock Parkway in 2006.

A re-enactment of part of the battle features in episode 1 of the eighteenth series of Murdoch Mysteries.

On his first Forward Guidance video on 19 April 2026, Prime Minister Mark Carney highlighted Major General Isaac Brock and the Battle of Queenston Heights in his address to Canadians.
