= Geneseo, New York =

Town in New York, United States

Geneseo, New York Seneca: Jo’néhsi:yo:h
- Town
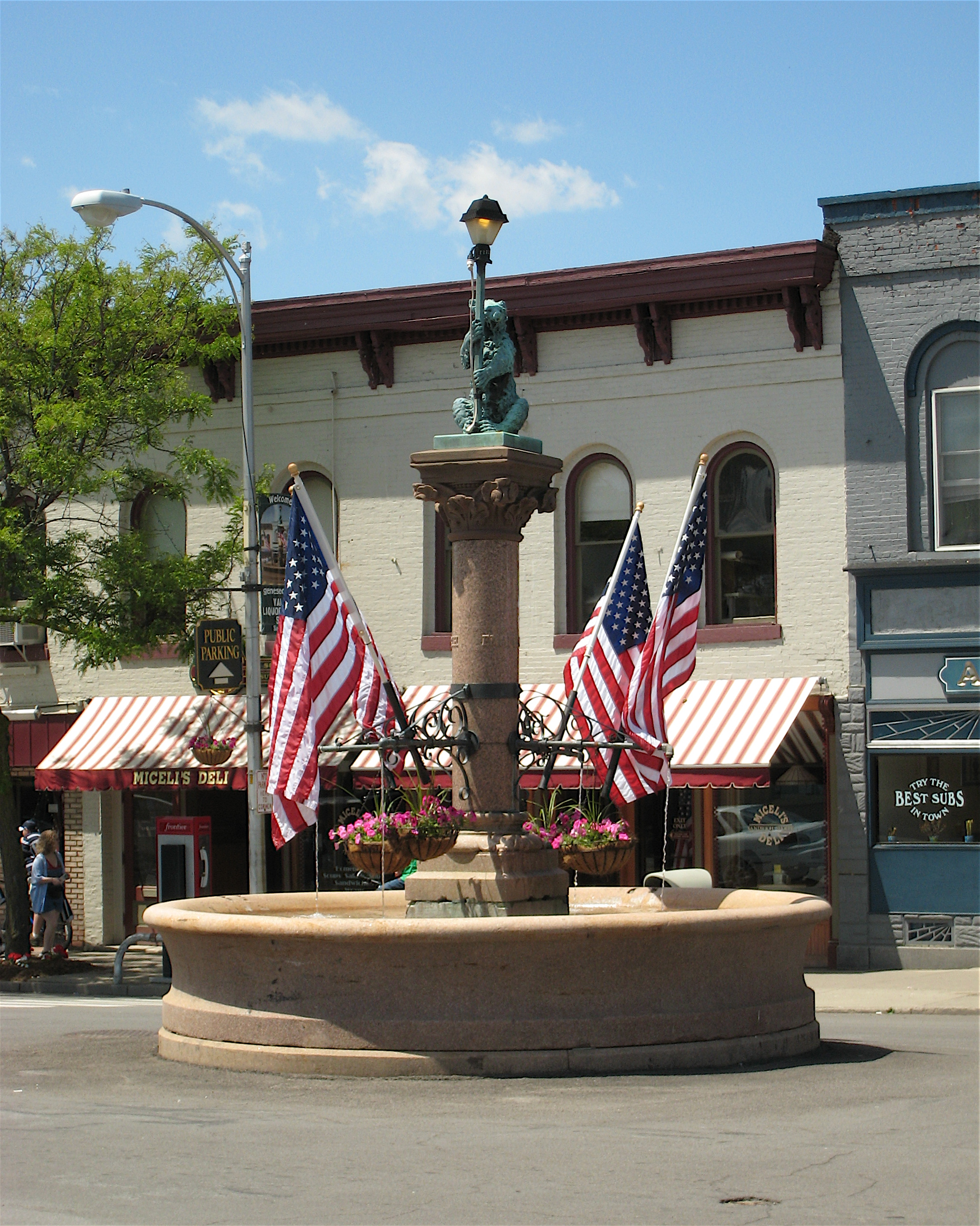
- The Bear Fountain sits in the center of Geneseo village's Main Street. In this picture, it is decorated with flags for Memorial Day.

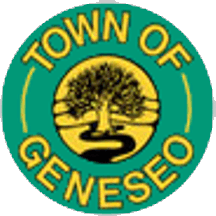
- Seal

- Location within New York Location within the United States
- Coordinates: 42°47′45″N 77°48′49″W
- Country: United States
- State: New York
- County: Livingston
- Town established: 1789

Government
  - Type: Town Board
  - Town Supervisor: William Wadsworth (D)

Area
  - Total: 45.14 sq mi (116.92 km^{2})
  - Land: 43.95 sq mi (113.82 km^{2})
  - Water: 1.20 sq mi (3.10 km^{2})
- Elevation: 909 ft (277 m)

Population (2010)
  - Total: 10,483
  - Estimate (2016): 10,726
  - Density: 244.1/sq mi (94.24/km^{2})
- Time zone: UTC-5 (Eastern (EST))
  - Summer (DST): UTC-4 (EDT)
- ZIP Codes: 14454 (Geneseo); 14510 (Mount Morris)
- Area code: 585
- FIPS code: 36-051-28629
- GNIS feature ID: 0978991
- Website: www.geneseony.org

Geneseo (/ˌdʒɛnɪˈsiːoʊ/ jen-i-SEE-oh) is a town in Livingston County in the Finger Lakes region of New York, United States. It is at the south end of the five-county Rochester Metropolitan Area. The population of the town was 10,483 at the 2010 census.

The English name "Geneseo" is an anglicization of the Seneca name for the earlier Seneca town on the site, Jo’néhsi:yo:h, meaning "Good sand there." The village of Geneseo lies within the western portion of the town. The village and town are known today mainly as the home of the State University of New York at Geneseo.

== History ==
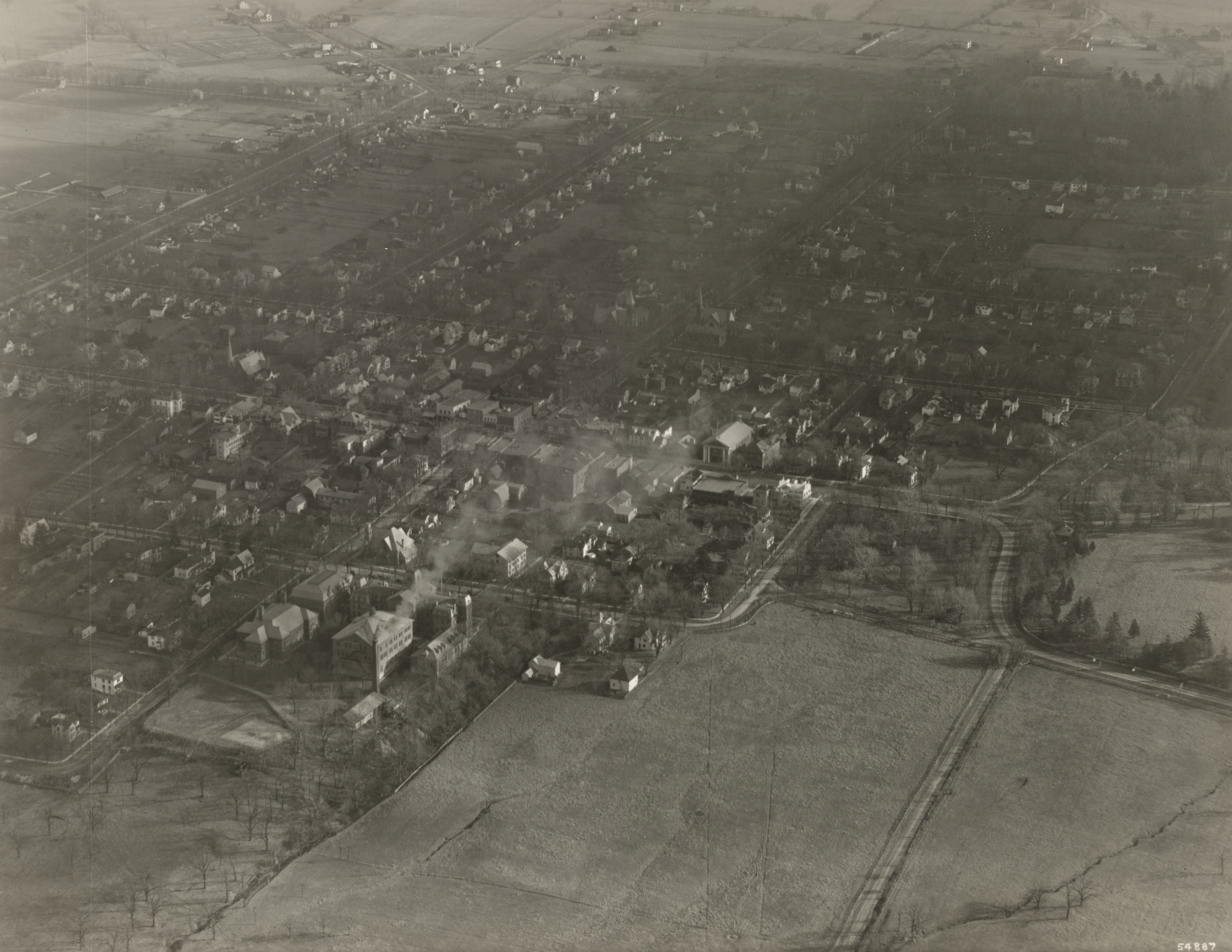
Aerial view of Geneso in December 1923

=== Pre-revolution ===
Near Geneseo was the largest Seneca village, Jo’néhsi:yo:h, a center of power for the Haudenosaunee Confederacy. It was also the confederacy's "bread basket", with orchards, vineyards, and fields of maize and vegetables.

During the American Revolution, the Seneca joined the British and the Tories against the colonists who were fighting for independence. The alliance's raids from the west were a major threat to the American cause, and General Washington sent the Sullivan Expedition to neutralize the Haudenosaunee. As Sullivan's army approached Geneseo with their "scorched earth" policy, the Senecas repeatedly fell back. However, a large Seneca party ambushed one of Sullivan's scouting parties, carried them as prisoners to Geneseo and tortured them to death. When Sullivan's troops arrived and found the savagely mutilated bodies, they became enraged and destroyed anything that could support the Haudenosaunee. No longer able to raid from Geneseo and the surrounding area, about 5,000 Seneca fled to British-held Fort Niagara, where they spent one of the coldest winters on record, with much loss of life, in camps outside the fort with only the small amount of supplies the British could spare.

=== Post-revolution ===
The town was established in 1789, before the formation of Livingston County. The colonists' settlement of Geneseo began shortly after James and William Wadsworth arrived in 1790. The brothers came to the Genesee Valley from Connecticut as agents of their uncle, Colonel Jeremiah Wadsworth, to care for and sell the land he purchased. The Wadsworths were part of the negotiations of the Treaty of Big Tree between Robert Morris and the Senecas at the site of Geneseo in 1797.

Geneseo, as well as nearby Mount Morris, was part of the Morris Reserve that Morris held back from his sale of much of western New York to the Holland Land Company.

Geneseo was the birthplace of Eliza Emily Chappell Porter in 1807, a nurse, teacher, school builder, and Underground Railroad operative during the Civil War. Geneseo was also the birthplace, in 1851, of the swindler Ferdinand Ward.

Geneseo was a background for tales of the law and small town life by Arthur C. Train, who lived and practiced law in the town for many years before the First World War. He gave it the name of “Pottsville”, and often used it as one of the settings for his stories of the Yankee lawyer, Ephraim Tutt.

The village of Geneseo became the county seat of Livingston County in 1821 and was incorporated in 1832. The State Normal School, now SUNY Geneseo, opened in 1871. In 1991, the United States Department of the Interior designated large parts of the village a National Historic Landmark.

The botanist Albert Francis Blakeslee (1874–1954) was born in Geneseo.

=== Present day ===
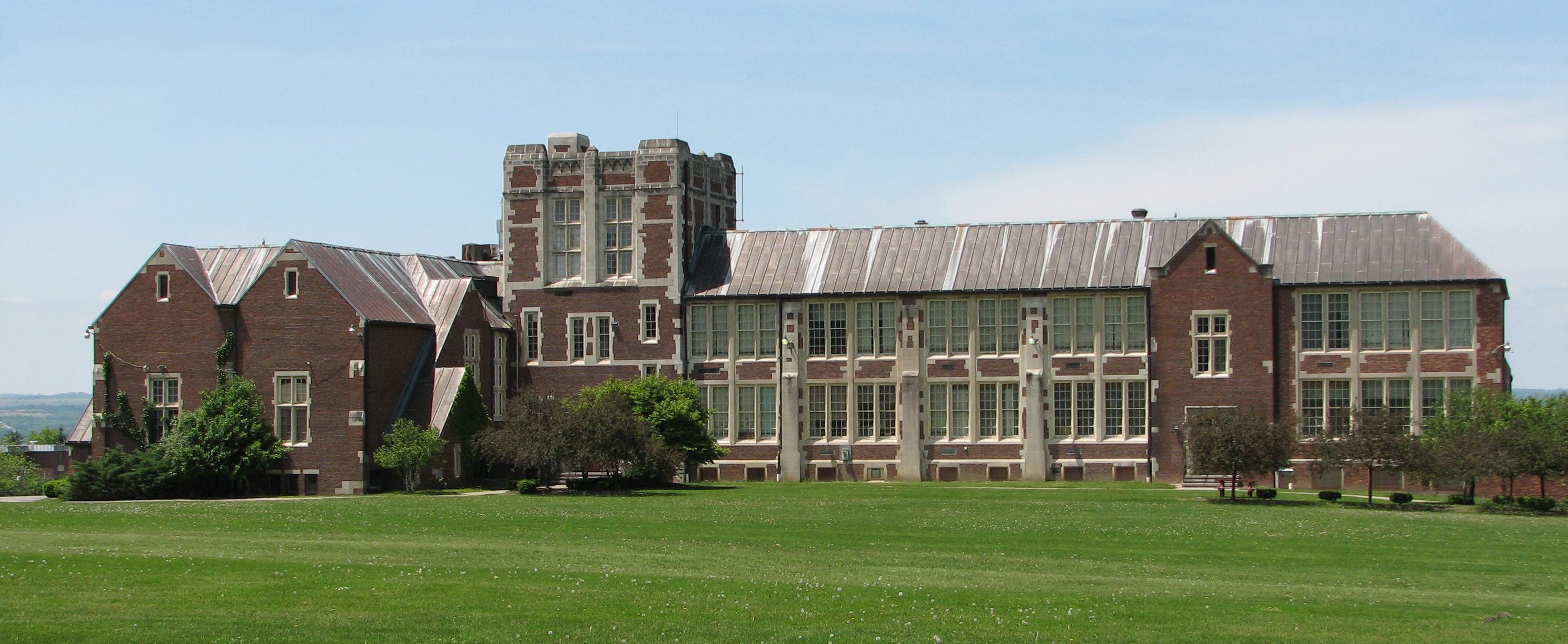
The Doty building, which was purchased and renovated for usage by SUNY Geneseo, was once Geneseo's high school. Currently it holds administrative offices for the college.

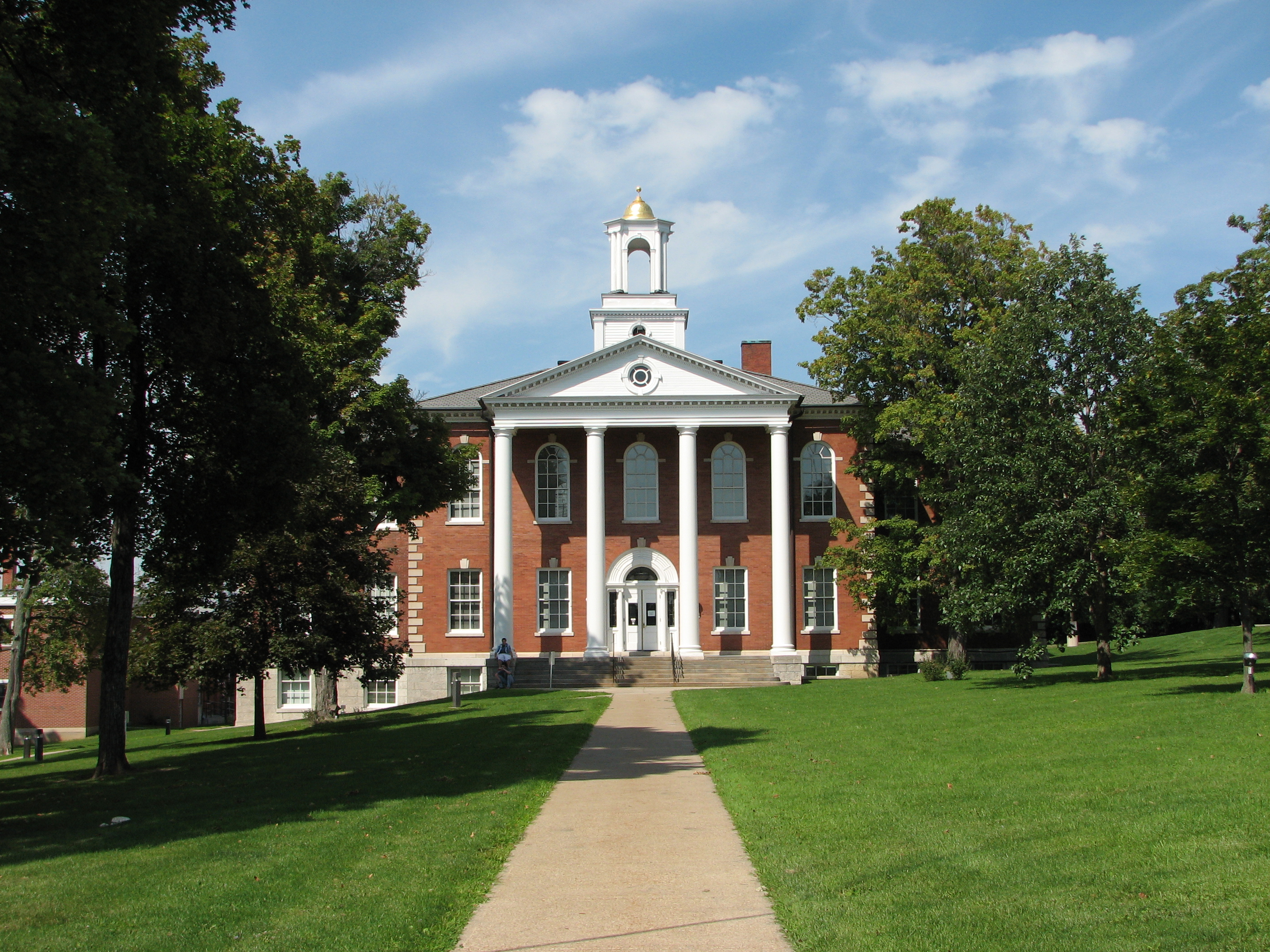
The Livingston County Courthouse and offices are at the end of Main Street.

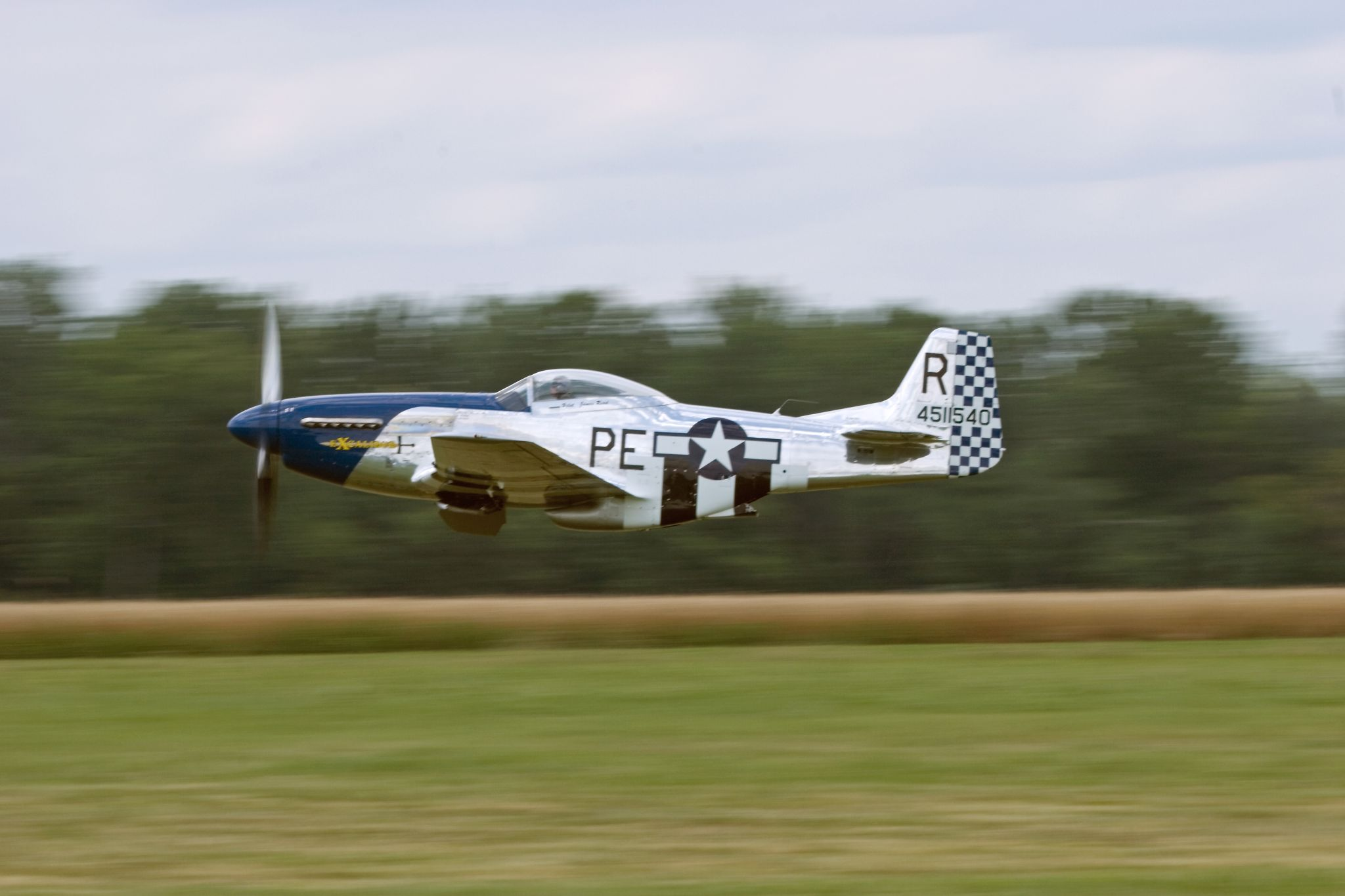
A P-51 Mustang at the 2007 Geneseo Airshow

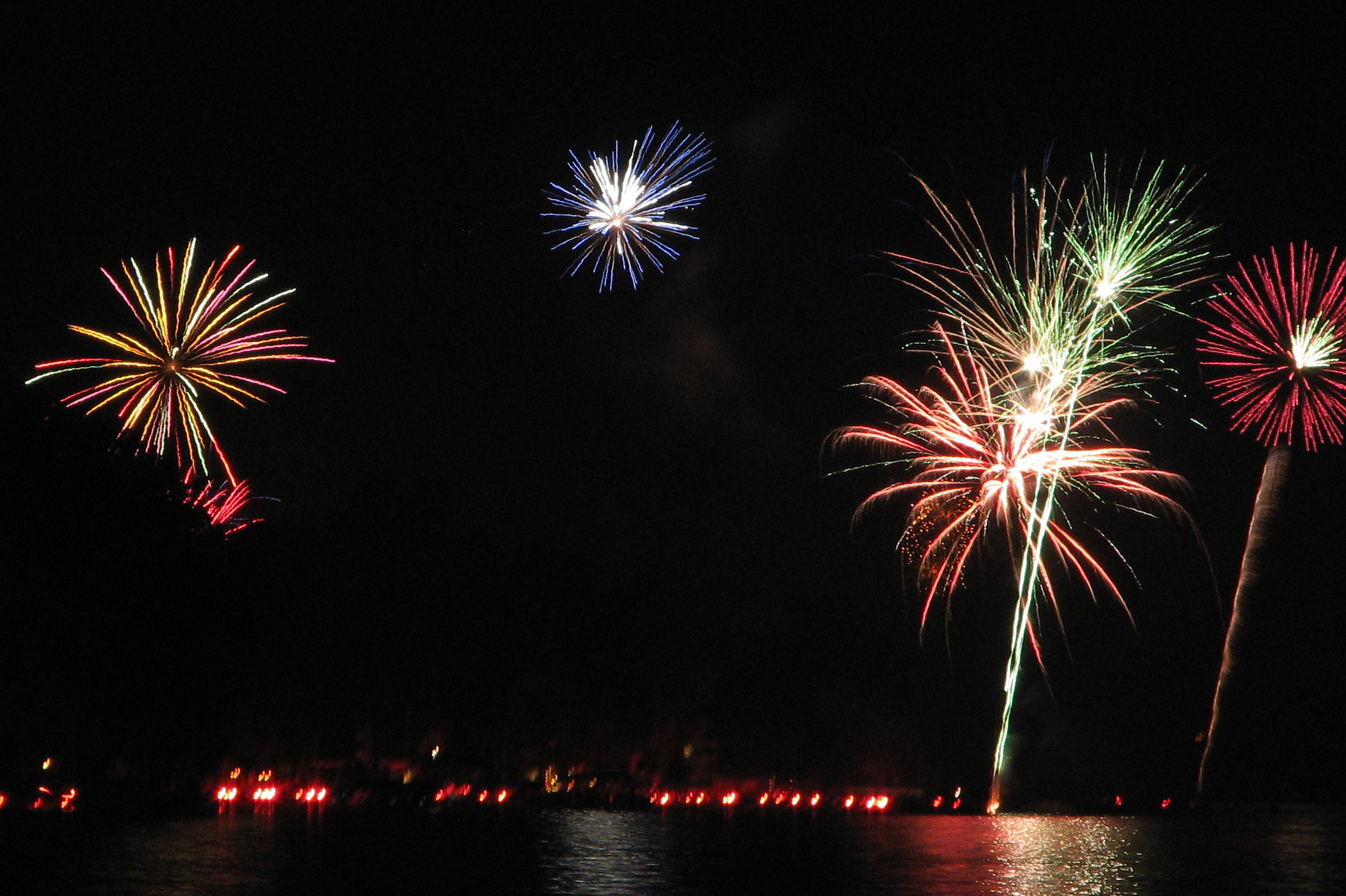
Conesus Lake during the 2006 "Ring of Fire"

The valley of the Genesee River is wide and fertile, with some of the best agricultural land in New York, but it was very prone to flooding, and Geneseo suffered several bad floods until the United States Army Corps of Engineers' construction of the Mount Morris Dam upstream of the community in the 1950s. Agriculture is now a large contributor to Geneseo's economy. Geneseo is also used by many as a bedroom community for jobs in Rochester, 30 miles (48 km) to the north. The village of Geneseo is governed by a mayor and four trustees.

The town can be roughly divided into three geographies: the village has a small-town atmosphere, much of Route 20A is commercialized, and the majority of the town's area is farmland. One of the main issues faced by the community today is urban sprawl. The increasing presence of big-box stores on Route 20A has been welcomed by some residents, who appreciate the convenience of nearby retailers, and discouraged by others, who oppose the suburbanization of the small town.

The Geneseo Airport (D52) is a general aviation airport west of the village, on the Wadsworth farm. It was established during July 1969, and is used for approximately 20 aircraft operations each day. Since 1980, it has hosted groups restoring and operating historic military aircraft—originally the National Warplane Museum, and now the 1941 Historical Aircraft Group Museum. An airshow is held annually on the field, during the second weekend in July.

The Association for the Preservation of Geneseo (APOG) is a civic organization dedicated to preserving, improving, and restoring the places of civic, architectural, and historic interest to Geneseo and to educate members of the community to their architectural and historical heritage. Additional aims and purposes are to encourage others to contribute their knowledge, advice, and financial assistance.

Sweet Briar and the Wadsworth Fort Site are listed on the National Register of Historic Places.

== Education ==
The Geneseo Central School District encompasses Geneseo and Groveland, and consists of Geneseo Central School, which graduates approximately 75 students each year.

The school mascot is the Blue Devils and wear blue and white, with a gray accent color. Past accent colors included red and black.

In 1933, the school moved to its own building on School Street and in 1963 added a wing. In 1974 it moved into a new building at its present location on Avon Road.

SUNY Geneseo is inside the village of Geneseo. There are approximately 4,000 undergraduate students.

== Geography ==
According to the United States Census Bureau, the town has an area of 45.1 square miles (116.9 km^{2}), of which 43.9 square miles (113.8 km^{2}) are land and 1.2 square miles (3.1 km^{2}), or 2.65%, are water.

The Genesee River defines the western town line, and Conesus Lake is on part of the eastern town line. Interstate 390 and U.S. Route 20A pass through the town, along with State Routes 39, 63, and 256.

=== Adjacent towns and areas ===
(Clockwise)

- Avon
- Livonia; Conesus
- Groveland
- Leicester; York

== Climate ==
Geneseo has a mild climate; summers typically bring temperatures between 60–80 °F (16–27 °C), while winters average 15–35 °F (−9–2 °C).

Climate data for Geneseo, New York
Month	Jan	Feb	Mar	Apr	May	Jun	Jul	Aug	Sep	Oct	Nov	Dec	Year
Record high °F (°C)	67 (19)	72 (22)	84 (29)	91 (33)	92 (33)	95 (35)	99 (37)	97 (36)	94 (34)	83 (28)	77 (25)	71 (22)	99 (37)
Mean daily maximum °F (°C)	32 (0)	34 (1)	42 (6)	55 (13)	68 (20)	77 (25)	81 (27)	79 (26)	71 (22)	60 (16)	48 (9)	37 (3)	57 (14)
Daily mean °F (°C)	24 (−4)	26 (−3)	34 (1)	46 (8)	58 (14)	66 (19)	71 (22)	69 (21)	62 (17)	51 (11)	40 (4)	30 (−1)	47.2 (8.4)
Mean daily minimum °F (°C)	16 (−9)	16 (−9)	24 (−4)	34 (1)	45 (7)	55 (13)	59 (15)	57 (14)	50 (10)	39 (4)	32 (0)	22 (−6)	37 (3)
Record low °F (°C)	−24 (−31)	−13 (−25)	−9 (−23)	11 (−12)	29 (−2)	35 (2)	45 (7)	37 (3)	28 (−2)	21 (−6)	11 (−12)	−7 (−22)	−24 (−31)
Average precipitation inches (mm)	1.57 (40)	1.42 (36)	2.20 (56)	2.48 (63)	3.00 (76)	3.75 (95)	3.78 (96)	3.18 (81)	3.20 (81)	2.56 (65)	2.45 (62)	1.93 (49)	31.52 (801)
Source: The Weather Channel

== Communities ==
The town includes a number of hamlets on the western shore of Conesus Lake. From north to south along NY 256 (West Lake Road), they are:

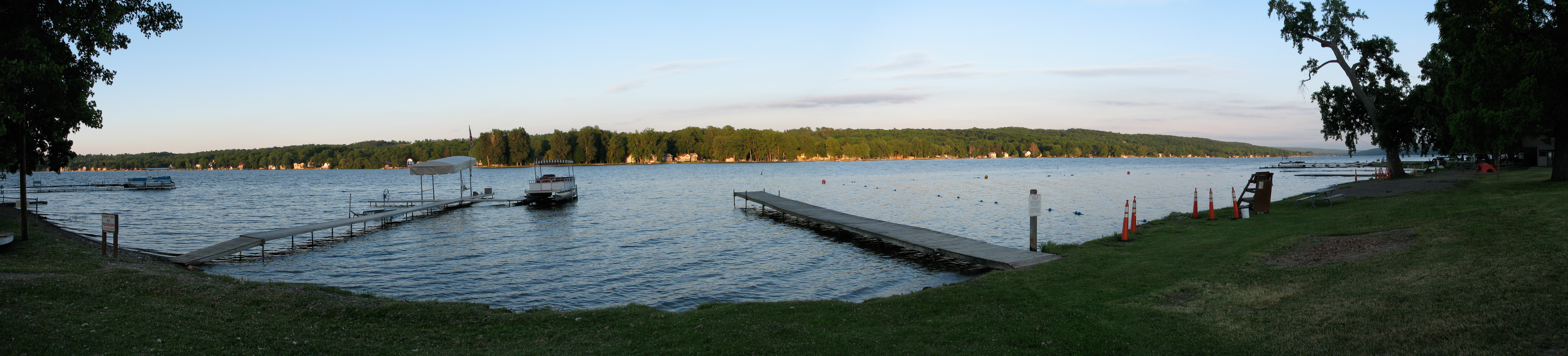
Part of the east side of Conesus Lake as seen from Geneseo's Long Point Park

- Sleggs Landing
- Eagle Point
- Sacketts Harbor
- Wadsworth Cove
- Long Point
- Long Point Cove
- Cottonwood Cove

All of the listed hamlets are part of the larger Conesus Lake census-designated place.

== Demographics ==
Historical population
Census	Pop.	Note	%±
1820	1,598		—
1830	2,675		67.4%
1840	2,892		8.1%
1850	2,958		2.3%
1860	3,002		1.5%
1870	3,032		1.0%
1880	3,340		10.2%
1890	3,534		5.8%
1900	3,613		2.2%
1910	3,188		−11.8%
1920	3,007		−5.7%
1930	3,135		4.3%
1940	3,133		−0.1%
1950	3,782		20.7%
1960	4,337		14.7%
1970	7,278		67.8%
1980	8,673		19.2%
1990	9,178		5.8%
2000	9,654		5.2%
2010	10,483		8.6%
2016 (est.)	10,726	▲	2.3%
U.S. Decennial Census

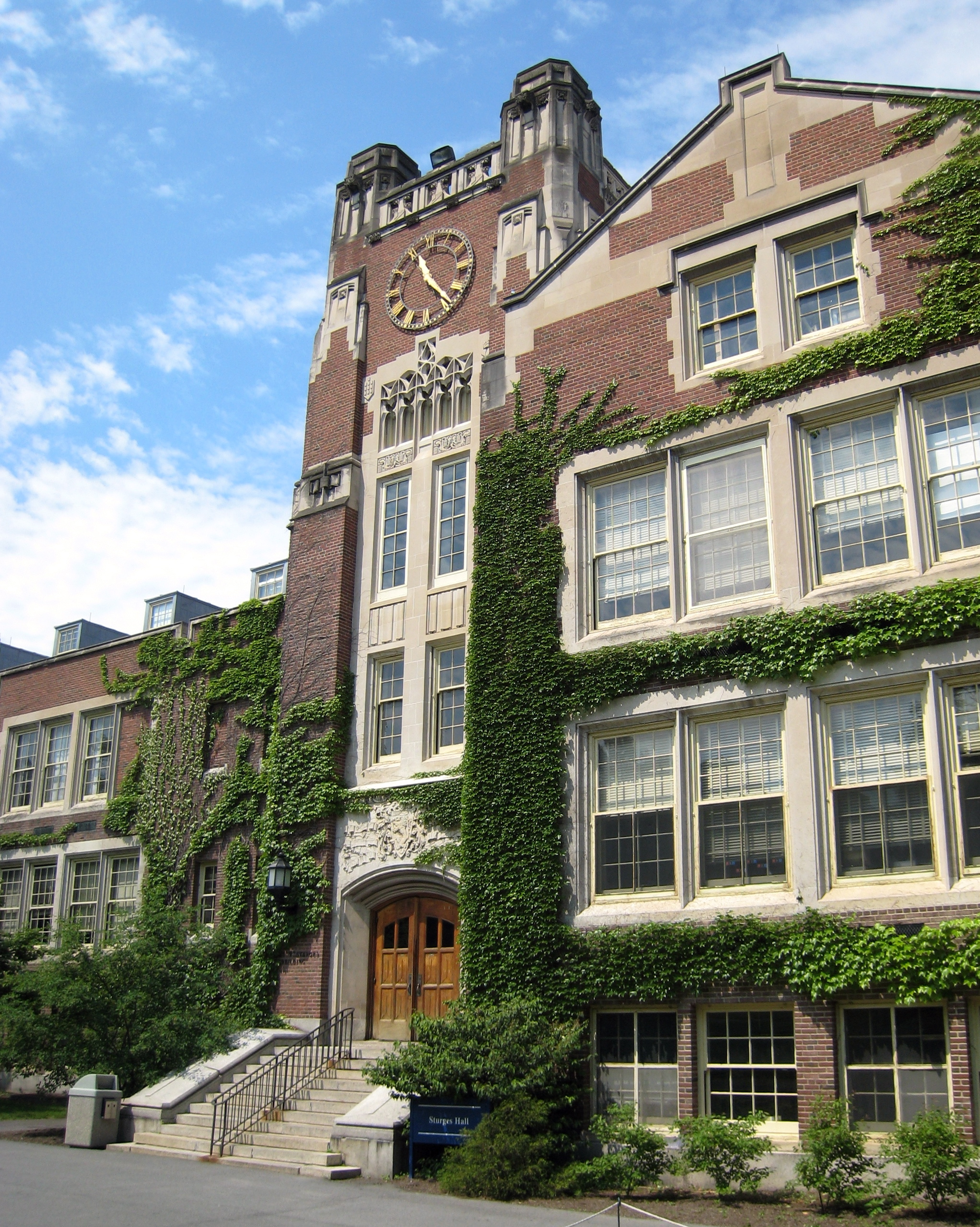
Sturges Hall is SUNY Geneseo's landmark building.

As of the census of 2000, there were 9,654 people, 2,523 households, and 1,303 families residing in the town. The population density was 219.6 inhabitants per square mile (84.8/km^{2}). There were 2,698 housing units at an average density of 23.7 persons per square kilometre (61 persons/mi^{2}). The town's racial makeup was 93.91% White, 1.48% African American, 0.11% Native American, 2.61% Asian, 0.04% Pacific Islander, 0.69% from other races, and 1.15% from two or more races. Hispanic or Latino residents of any race were 2.19% of the population.

There were 2,523 households, out of which 23.5% had children under the age of 18 living with them, 41.3% were married couples living together, 8.3% had a female householder with no husband present, and 48.4% were non-families. 26.0% of all households were made up of individuals, and 9.6% had someone living alone who was 65 years of age or older. The average household size was 2.53 and the average family size was 2.92.

11.9% of the town's population was under age of 18, 51.3% was from age 18 to 24, 15.2% was from age 25 to 44, 13.2% was from age 45 to 64, and 8.5% were age 65 or older. The median age was 22 years. For every 100 females, there were 72.3 males. For every 100 females age 18 and over, there were 68.4 males.

The town's median household income was $40,660, and the median family income was $62,206. Males had a median income of $42,218 versus $25,969 for females. The town's per capita income was $15,303. About 8.7% of families and 29.8% of the population were below the poverty line, including 12.2% of those under the age of 18 and 5.5% ages 65 or older.
