= Wadsworth Fort Site =

- U.S. National Register of Historic Places
- Nearest city: Geneseo, New York
- Area: 15 acres (6.1 ha)
- NRHP reference No.: 75001194
- Added to NRHP: June 11, 1975

Wadsworth Fort Site, also known as Brimmer's Sweet or Brier Farm Site, is an archaeological site in Geneseo in Livingston County, New York. In 1956, human remains representing a minimum of one individual were removed from the surface of the Wadsworth Fort Site by the Rochester Museum and Science Center. No known individual was identified. No associated funerary objects are present. Based on archeological context, this individual has been identified as Native American. Based on site location and continuities of material culture as represented in other collections from the site, the Wadsworth Fort Site has been identified as Iroquois (Seneca), dated to 1540–1560.

It was listed on the National Register of Historic Places in 1975.
