= James Wadsworth (of Geneseo) =

American businessman (1768-1844)

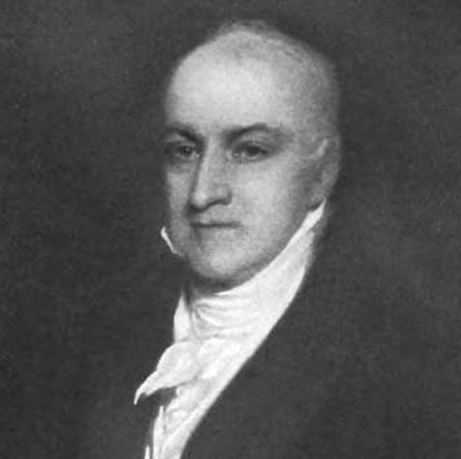
- Born: April 20, 1768; Durham, Connecticut Colony, British America
- Died: June 7, 1844 (aged 76); Geneseo, New York, U.S.
- Education: Yale University (1787)
- Spouse: Naomi Walcott (m. 1804; died 1831)
- Children: 5, including James
- Parent(s): John Noyes Wadsworth Sr. Esther Parsons
- Relatives: William Wadsworth (brother); James Wadsworth (uncle); Jeremiah Wadsworth (cousin); James W. Wadsworth (grandson)

James Wadsworth (April 20, 1768 Durham, Connecticut Colony – June 7, 1844 Geneseo, New York) was an influential and prominent 18th- and 19th-century pioneer, educator, land speculator, agriculturalist, businessman, and community leader of the early Genesee Valley settlements in Western New York State. He was the patriarch of the prominent Genesee Valley Wadsworths.

== Early life ==
James Wadsworth was born in 1768 in Durham, Middlesex County, Connecticut Colony. He was the youngest of the three sons of John Noyes Wadsworth Sr. by his second wife, Esther Parsons. His uncle and namesake was James Wadsworth. James' other brothers were his eldest half brother John Noyes Wadsworth Jr., by his father’s first marriage to Susan Camp, and his elder full brother William Wadsworth (1765–1833). James and his brothers are scions of the prominent Wadsworth family of Connecticut, and being a descendant of one of the Founders of Hartford, Connecticut, William Wadsworth (1594–1675), who under the leadership of Pastor Thomas Hooker helped found that city in June 1636.

James Wadsworth was a graduate of Yale University in 1787 at the age of 19.

== Career ==
After graduating from Yale in 1787, Wadsworth traveled north to Montreal, Quebec, in Canada to teach for a year. While away, his father, John Wadsworth, died and left his sons a substantial inheritance, estimated to be nearly $15,000 each (over $225,000 in modern terms). James moved back to Connecticut to manage his inheritance.

=== The Genesee Valley ===
Upon his return to Connecticut in the spring of 1789, James and his brother William were summoned to the home of their father's prominent and wealthy second cousin, Colonel Jeremiah Wadsworth of American Revolutionary War and Continental Congress fame, in Hartford. Jeremiah was considered one of the wealthiest men in Connecticut at the time and was interested in investing in, and financially backing, the efforts of Oliver Phelps and Nathaniel Gorham, who in the previous year purchased more than 2,250,000 acres (9,100 km^{2}) of land from the Iroquois Six Nations in Western New York State, known as the "Phelps and Gorham Purchase." Jeremiah adjudged James as having "ambition," "clear mind," and a "tenacious will," and so wanted James and William to be Land Agents on his behalf and to personally move to this virgin territory to survey and improve the land while promoting its settlement as well as manage his 200,000-acre (810 km^{2}) investment. In return, James and William were offered 2,000 acres (8.1 km^{2}) at his cost ($0.08 per acre) and reduced price for any further purchases, as well as a fee for the sale of Jeremiah’s land.

James and his brother William accepted Jeremiah’s proposal and the following spring, in May 1790, 22-year-old James, his brother William, a black woman named Jenny, Gad Wadsworth, a relative who was in charge of the chattel, and several "axe men" headed west to the Genesee Valley. After several difficult weeks of travel by rivers, streams and over land by Indian trails, they arrived on the banks of the Genesee River at a place the Seneca nation called Big Tree on June 9, 1790. They claimed the land and built a log cabin in a meadow near the east bank of the Genesee River about half a mile west of the present site of "The Homestead" at Geneseo, New York. Beyond the settlements near Fort Niagara, they were the first Europeans to establish a permanent settlement west of Seneca Lake. Both James and his brother William had an innate sense of honor and integrity, even to a fault, as James was involved in two separate duels. James was a theorist, planner, colonist and lover of books while William was more down-to-earth, a working farmer, militia officer and a "man with the common touch." James was the more scholarly of the two, and had a shrewd mind for business and a talented negotiator, while William was a rugged hands-on type with a natural penchant for husbandry, agriculture and public duty.

After the first trees were felled and the log cabin was completed at Big Tree (later renamed Geneseo), Wadsworth immediately began the work for which he was to excel. Starting in the spring of 1791, James traveled to New York City to begin advertising for the sale and settlement of Genesee Valley lands. He then traveled on to Philadelphia, Pennsylvania, visiting Massachusetts, and returned to Connecticut, all while frequently encouraging settlement by offering incentives for prospective settlers. In February 1796, James sailed to England to promote settlement, but the dismal economic state of affairs in England prevented any headway. So he proceeded “...to examine the state of agriculture and view the manufacturing towns.” While in Europe, James went to the Netherlands, and met with the proprietors of the Holland Land Company, securing a future deal with them for lands west of the Genesee, once the company had secured the Indian title to these lands.

In December 1796, James returned to New York, remaining in New York City and further soliciting settlers. Late the following summer, he returned to the Genesee Valley escorting several settlers. When James returned, he found his brother, William, had built a large proper cobblestone house for their occupancy, quite different from the first small log cabin they had lived in for over six years. On August 28, 1797, James and William were the host for the Treaty of Big Tree. This treaty effectively extinguished the Indian title to the land west of the Genesee River and created ten reservations for the Seneca in New York State. By 1800, James and William had acquired 32,500 acres (132 km^{2}), most of which was leased to tenant farmers with the option to buy. William served as Town supervisor for 21 years, and built around them an agricultural community based on enlightened principles of soil conservation, selective stock breeding, scientific agricultural methods, aesthetic preservation and public education.

=== Educator ===
Wadsworth was known as a man who cherished education and learning throughout his life. He was heavily involved in the promotion of teacher training in Geneseo and starting a primary school there, seeking out the school master, the greater part of whose wages would he paid himself.

In January 1829, he wrote former clerk, Philo Fuller, a state assemblyman, to urge the passage of legislation to establish county high schools with well-educated teachers. James wrote to him: "To improve the common schools in this state, the employment of more able instructors is indispensable." He lobbied the State's superintendents of public instruction. In 1830, James was selected to represent Livingston County at a New York State Corresponding Committee at Utica, New York. He pressed two issues in particular: "Are Common Schools Worth the Money Paid?" And "Whether to Establish an Institute to Train Teachers." At another meeting in January 1831, he was elected vice president of the Eighth Senatorial District to investigate the need for institutions for teacher training.

On March 11, 1833, James invested $6,000 of his own capital toward what he hoped would be a start toward the funding of school libraries. James created a trust to compile, print and distribute to the trustees of each common school in New York State courses of popular lectures "adapted to the capacities of children" which could be "conveniently read in half an hour." The lectures were to be on six subjects: On the Application of Science for the Arts, On Agriculture and Horticulture, On the Principles of Legislation, On Political Economy, On Astronomy and Chemistry, and On the Intellectual, Moral and Religious Instruction of the Youth of this State by Means of Common Schools. He also underwrote the cost of publishing and distributing John Nicholson's The Farmer's Assistant and John O. Taylor's The District School in 1834.

In 1838, New York Governor George W. Patterson wrote, “In regard to the origin of the School District Library System of this state, I will say to you, that the whole credit belongs to the Honorable James Wadsworth, of Geneseo..." Patterson insisted that he had just performed his "duty" to obtain a bill permanently earmarking funds for school libraries, over what he considered violent objections. Rather, "the credit of all that has been done belongs to the praise-worthy efforts of Mr. Wadsworth." Wadsworth wanted a library "open and free for the gratuitous use as well of the inhabitants of the County of Livingston" and also wanted a new public library to be located in Geneseo. He privately funded the Geneseo Atheneum in 1842, which opened with books, scientific equipment and mineral specimens, which were to be available to all. He opened this library to promote "the moral and intellectual instruction of the young and the diffusion of science and literature." His own books and specimens became the basis for it and the library/museum was later renamed the Wadsworth Library.

== Personal life ==
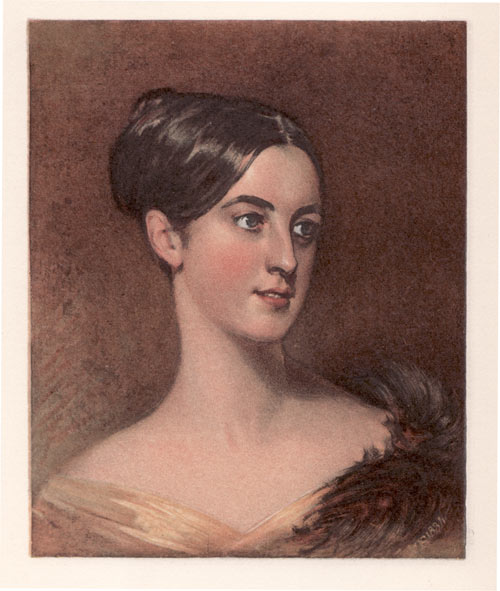
His daughter, Elise, by Thomas Sully

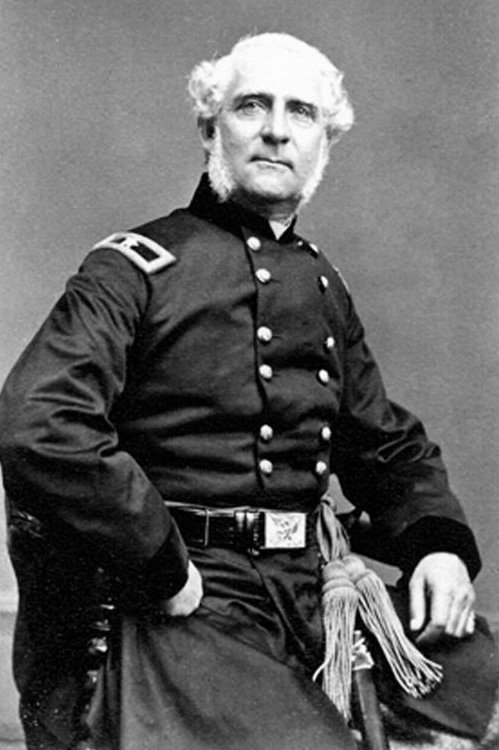
His son, James, during the American Civil War

On October 1, 1804, he married Naomi Walcott (1777–1831) of East Windsor, Connecticut, whom he had met on his travels to Connecticut. The couple immediately moved to James’ farm in Geneseo and raised a family, including:

- Harriet Wadsworth (1805–1833)
- James Samuel Wadsworth (1807–1864), a Union general in the American Civil War who was mortally wounded in battle during the Battle of the Wilderness, who married Mary Craig Wharton in 1834.
- William Walcott Wadsworth (1810–1852)
- Cornelia Wadsworth (1812–1831)
- Elizabeth "Elise" Wadsworth (1815–1851), who married Sir Charles Murray (1806–1895), the British diplomat, shortly after her father's death, and was the mother of Charles James Murray, dying in childbirth.

Wadsworth died on June 7, 1844, in Geneseo, New York.

=== Descendants ===
His descendants included James Wolcott Wadsworth (1846–1926), James Wolcott Wadsworth Jr. (1877–1952), and James Jeremiah Wadsworth (1905–1984).
