= John Chrystie =

US Army officer (1788–1813)

John Chrystie (4 January 1788 – 23 July 1813) was a United States Army officer who played a major but controversial part in the Battle of Queenston Heights during the War of 1812.

He was educated at Princeton College and Columbia College, from which he graduated in 1806. At Columbia, John Chrystie was a member of the Philolexian Society.

Chrystie was commissioned as a first lieutenant in May 1808. In March 1812 (at the age of 24), he was promoted to the rank of lieutenant colonel in the 13th U.S. Infantry.

At Queenston Heights, he was to command the regular contingent in the initial crossing of the Niagara River from New York State into Ontario. He crossed over the Canadian side of the river once a secure foothold had been established, but his boat crew panicked and returned to the American side of the river, and was absent when the U.S. troops who had crossed were cut off and forced to surrender. He was blamed for the American defeat by Colonel Solomon Van Rensselaer and other officers. Chrystie was accused of cowardice after the incident. Despite this, he was promoted to colonel the following year.

Chrystie died of natural causes on 23 July 1813, and was buried in Niagara Falls, New York. Chrystie Street on the Lower East Side of Manhattan is named for him.
