= James Wadsworth (lawyer) =

American politician

James Wadsworth III (July 8, 1730 – September 22, 1816) was an American lawyer from Durham, Connecticut.

After graduating from Yale College in 1748, he became clerk of Durham from 1756 to 1786. Initially a brigadier general of the Connecticut militia during the Revolutionary War, after the death of David Wooster in 1777 he became the major general of militia and the second-highest ranked militia officer in the state. After the war, he became a justice of the New Haven County Court of Common Pleas. He served as a delegate to the Continental Congress from 1783 to 1786, Speaker of the Connecticut House of Representatives from 1784 to 1785, a member of the Connecticut Executive Council from 1785 to 1790, and as a judge of the Connecticut Supreme Court of Errors from 1787 to 1788.
