= 2023 King's Birthday Honours (Australia) =

Annual honours in Australia

The 2023 King's Birthday Honours for Australia was announced on 11 June 2023 by the Governor-General, David Hurley.

The Birthday Honours are appointments by some of the 15 Commonwealth realms of King Charles III to various orders and honours to reward and highlight good works by citizens of those countries. The Birthday Honours are awarded as part of the King's Official Birthday celebrations during the month of June.

== Order of Australia ==
Order of Australia civil ribbon

Order of Australia military ribbon

=== Companion of the Order of Australia (AC) ===
==== General Division ====
- The Honourable Colin James Barnett – For eminent service to the people and Parliament of Western Australia, particularly as Premier, to economic and infrastructure development, to social welfare reform, and to the Indigenous community.
- Emeritus Professor Caroline Isabel Bower – For eminent service to medical research as a paediatric epidemiologist, particularly in birth defects and early childhood development, to health and welfare through public health initiatives, and to medical education.
- Professor Glenda Margaret Halliday – For eminent service to medical research in the field of neurodegenerative disorders, including the development of revised diagnostic criteria for Parkinson's disease, and as a mentor.
- The late John Barry Humphries, AO, CBE – For eminent service to the arts as a comedian, actor, author, satirist and entertainer, to the promotion of Australian culture, and as a patron of organisations.
- Professor David John Hunter – For eminent service to medicine as an epidemiologist, particularly in relation to disease prevention and early detection, and to the aetiology of breast, colorectal, prostate and skin cancers.
- The Honourable Jennifer Louise Macklin – For eminent service to the people and Parliament of Australia, to social welfare, particularly the introduction of paid parental leave and the National Disability Insurance Scheme, and to the Indigenous community.

=== Officer of the Order of Australia (AO) ===
==== General Division ====
- Clinical Associate Professor Robert Ali – For distinguished service to medical and health research, particularly drug and alcohol dependence, and to education and training.
- Dr Kerry John Breen, AM – For distinguished service to the advancement of ethical medical research, to the development of doctors' health programs, and as an author.
- Sally Anne Capp – For distinguished service to the people of Melbourne, to local government, to business, and to the community through various organisations.
- Josef Chromy, OAM – For distinguished service to the community through tourism, particularly the wine and food sector, to property development, and charitable contributions.
- Professor Julie-Anne Considine – For distinguished service to medicine in the field of emergency nursing, to tertiary education, and to professional associations.
- Professor David Craik – For distinguished service to science in the field of biological and medicinal chemistry, to tertiary education, and as a mentor.
- Scientia Professor Louisa Jane Degenhardt – For distinguished service to medical research, particularly addiction and mental disorders, to psychology, and to professional associations.
- Distinguished Professor Kingsley Dixon – For distinguished service to conservation biology, particularly ecological research and restoration, and to tertiary education.
- Moya Dodd – For distinguished service to football as a player and administrator at the national and international level, as a role model to women, and to the law.
- Professor David Alan Ellwood – For distinguished service to medicine as an obstetrician and gynaecologist, to research and tertiary education, and to professional associations.
- Graham Bruce Ford, AM – For distinguished service to surf lifesaving through leadership roles at the national and international level, and to the community.
- Dr Cassandra Goldie – For distinguished service to social justice through leadership and advocacy to promote the rights of people marginalised and disadvantaged in the community.
- Professor Jane Gunn – For distinguished service to medical administration in leadership roles, to tertiary education and research, and to the community.
- Distinguished Professor Jane Patricia Hall – For distinguished service to the social sciences, to academic leadership and mentoring, and to national and international associations.
- Dr Marianne Horak – For distinguished service to entomology, to taxonomic and phylogenetic research, and to philanthropic endeavours.
- Professor Michael Horowitz – For distinguished service to endocrinology, particularly diabetes, as a researcher, educator and clinician.
- Rosemary Therese Huxtable, PSM – For distinguished service to public administration through leadership roles in the areas of health and finance, and to strategic policy reform.
- Kate Michelle Jenkins – For distinguished service to human rights governance, to advancing gender equity, to the promotion of inclusivity, and to the law.
- Dr Misty Rayna Jenkins – For distinguished service to medical science as an immunologist, to the promotion of women in STEM, and to the Indigenous community.
- Clinical Professor Brendon John Kearney, AM – For distinguished service to medicine in the fields of health technology assessment and health outcomes research.
- Professor Michael Richard Kidd, AM – For distinguished service in medical administration and community health, to primary care leadership, and to tertiary education.
- Clinical Associate Professor Sharon Liberali – For distinguished service to special needs dentistry, to infection control practice enhancement, to tertiary education, and to professional organisations.
- Professor Glen Douglas Liddell-Mola – For distinguished service to obstetrics and gynaecology, to reproductive health research, and to medical education in the Pacific region.
- Clinical Professor Ruth Marshall – For distinguished service to rehabilitation medicine, particularly to people living with spinal cord injury or disorder, as a leader, mentor and clinician.
- Robert Dobson Millner – For distinguished service to business, to rugby union as an administrator, and to the community through philanthropic contributions.
- The Right Honourable The Lord Mayor of Sydney Clover Moore – For distinguished service to local government, to the people and Parliament of New South Wales, and to the community of Sydney.
- Nicholas William Moore – For distinguished service to the finance, business, and commerce sectors, to arts administration, and to education.
- Shellie Morris – For distinguished service to the performing arts, to the Indigenous community, and to not-for-profit organisations.
- Professor Grant Alan McArthur – For distinguished service to medicine as a clinician scientist through melanoma and cancer research, and to leadership roles.
- Marilyn Beatrice Pattison – For distinguished service to occupational therapy through national and international leadership roles, and to advances in practice standards.
- Orwell Peter Phillips – For distinguished service to heritage conservation, to architecture, and to professional organisations.
- Reginald John Richardson, AM – For distinguished service to community health organisations, and to the visual arts as a leader, supporter and patron.
- Dr Lynette Riley – For distinguished service to education, particularly through the development of Indigenous curriculum and student support, to reconciliation, and to the community.
- Alan Schwartz, AM – For distinguished service to the community through philanthropic endeavours, and to sustainable social benefit initiatives.
- Dr Sandra Penso Staffieri – For distinguished service to medicine as an orthoptist and vision researcher, and to paediatric ophthalmology.
- Irene May Stainton – For distinguished service to the Indigenous community through cultural heritage leadership, and through health and social welfare organisations.
- Scientia Professor Fiona Stapleton – For distinguished service to optometry as a researcher, mentor and role model, to tertiary education, and to national and international organisations.
- Naomi Claire Steer – For distinguished service to human rights through international humanitarian relief operations, and to the superannuation sector.
- Cheryl Anne Vardon – For distinguished service to public administration, particularly education and health, and for the protection of children and young people.
- Alan James Whalley – For distinguished service to business, particularly the defence capability industry, to the public sector, to aviation history, and to the community.
- Gerald Francis Williams – For distinguished service to critical care nursing, to medical education, to professional organisations, and as a mentor.
- Professor Donald Andrew Wilson – For distinguished service to medicine through public health leadership, to regulatory bodies, and to tertiary education.
- Lisa Jane Wilson – For distinguished service to primary industry, and to the education of refugee and asylum seeker young women.
- Timothy John Winton – For distinguished service to literature as an author and novelist, to conservation, and to environmental advocacy.
- Professor Erica Michelle Wood – For distinguished service to transfusion medicine and haemovigilance, to haematology, and to national and international organisations.
- Professor John Raymond Zalcberg, OAM – For distinguished service to oncology as a clinician-researcher, and as an advocate for those living with cancer.

==== Military Division ====
Navy

- Vice Admiral Mark David Hammond, AM, RAN – For distinguished service to the Royal Australian Navy in senior command roles.

Army

- Major General Natasha Anne Fox, AM, CSC – For distinguished service to the Australian Defence Force people capability as Head People Capability and Deputy Chief of Army.

Air Force

- Air Vice-Marshal Stephen Leslie Meredith, AM, DSM – For distinguished service in responsible positions as Commander Aerospace Operational Support Group; Head Joint Capability Management and Integration; and Deputy Chief of the Air Force.

=== Member of the Order of Australia (AM) ===
==== General Division ====
- Dr Raymond John Adams – For significant service to education and psychometric testing.
- Dr Karin Jeanette Alexander – For significant service to dentistry, and to professional bodies.
- Yasmin Allen – For significant service to finance and business, and to the not-for-profit sector.
- John Geoffrey Allpass – For significant service to business, and to the community.
- The Honourable Justice Thomas Altobelli – For significant service to the law, and to legal education.
- David Thomas Anthony – For significant service to the agricultural sector, and to the community of Narrabri.
- Dr Tony Cecil Badrick – For significant service to diagnostic pathology in leadership roles, and to education.
- Professor Melanie Bahlo – For significant service to genetic and infectious disease research, and to public health.
- Fiona Elizabeth Balfour – For significant service to corporate governance, and to the aviation sector.
- Professor Josephine Penelope Barraket – For significant service to education, and to the development of social enterprise.
- Dr Elizabeth Barrett – For significant service to rural and remote medicine in various roles.
- Milton Ross Bartlett – For significant service to surf lifesaving in international, national and local roles.
- Professor Deborah Jane Bateson – For significant service to medicine through research and education, and to reproductive health.
- Robyn Ann Batten – For significant service to the not-for-profit, health and aged care sectors.
- Suzanne Becker – For significant service to the disability services sector.
- Jane Fair Bell – For significant service to governance in the medical research, healthcare, and not-for-profit sectors.
- Maria Berry – For significant service to football, to women in sport, and to business.
- Associate Professor Ravi Subramanya Bhat – For significant service to medicine, and to rural psychiatry.
- Professor Marcela Bilek – For significant service to physics and biomedical engineering.
- Dr David James Blacker – For significant service to medicine, and to neurological research.
- Roger Paul Blake – For significant service to sport as a competitor, administrator and statistician.
- Peter John Blatch, OAM – For significant service to youth through Scouting, and to education.
- Anton Block – For significant service to the Jewish community in Australia, and to the law.
- David Michael Blunt – For significant service to the Parliament of New South Wales.
- Jill Elizabeth Boehm, OAM – For significant service to community health in the Shoalhaven region.
- Dawn May Borchardt – For significant service to youth through Girl Guiding.
- Lindsay Jon Bourke – For significant service to the beekeeping and honey industry, and to the community.
- Wing Commander Sharon Amanda Bown – For significant service to veterans and their families.
- Emeritus Professor Philip Manley Boyce – For significant service to psychiatric research and education.
- Dr James Palmer Bradley – For significant service to medicine in the field of anaesthetics.
- Antoinette Braybrook – For significant service to the law, and to family violence prevention.
- Sue Broadway – For significant service to circus performance, and to physical theatre.
- Professor Alexander Jonathan Brown – For significant service to the law, and to public policy, particularly to whistleblower protection.
- Graham Bruce – For significant service to surf lifesaving at the national, state and local levels.
- Ormonde Roger Butler, OAM – For significant service to the community through charitable and volunteer organisations.
- Dr Matthew William Butlin – For significant service to economic and social research, and to public policy.
- John Camillo – For significant service to industrial relations in the manufacturing industry, and to the community.
- Associate Professor Rosanna Capolingua – For significant service to patient care, to medicine, and as a role model to women.
- Dr Marcus Patrick Carey – For significant service to urogynaecology, and to women's health.
- Emeritus Professor Colleen Cartwright – For significant service to aged care planning, policy and research.
- Barbara Mary Champion – For significant service to children through play advocacy, to local government, and to education.
- Simon Chan – For significant service to multiculturalism, to the Indigenous community, and to the arts.
- Clinical Associate Professor Andrew Chang – For significant service to ophthalmology and retinal surgery as a clinician and educator.
- Karen Jeanette Chappel – For significant service to local government, and to the community of Morawa.
- Maureen Heather Christie – For significant service to wildlife conservation.
- Alison Churchill – For significant service to social welfare through prisoner rehabilitation..
- Brett Robert Clark – For significant service to community health, to the arts, and to sports organisations.
- Professor Emerita Berwyn Clayton – For significant service to the vocational education and training sector.
- Rhonda Mary Clayton – For significant service to squash as a competitor and administrator.
- Professor Mark Considine – For significant service to education, and to the political and social sciences.
- Peter Maxwell Cooke – For significant service to the Indigenous community of the Northern Territory.
- Josephine Helen Cooper – For significant service to the philanthropic sector, and to the Anglican Church of Australia.
- Christine Elizabeth Corby, OAM – For significant service to Indigenous health, and to the community of Walgett.
- John James Cowin – For significant service to business, and to philanthropic support.
- Philip George Crabb – For significant service to the mining industry, and to the community of Western Australia.
- Ian Neville Crawford – For significant service to the dental industry, and to sport.
- Dr Matthew Ronald Crawford – For significant service to medicine, particularly chronic and complex pain management.
- Patricia Anne Cross – For significant service to business, to the finance industry, and to corporate governance.
- Patricia Margaret Crossin – For significant service to the Parliament of Australia, and to the community of the Northern Territory.
- Professor Paul Merlin Crossley – For significant service to education, and to molecular biology.
- Dr Margaret Anne Crowley – For significant service to community health, and to people with low vision.
- The Honourable Justice Jane Culver – For significant service to the judiciary, and to the law.
- Dr Peter Michael Dann – For significant service to conservation, and the preservation of sea birds.
- Stefano De Pieri – For significant service to the community of Mildura, and to the hospitality industry.
- Sonia Dean – For significant service to museums and galleries as an art researcher, writer and curator.
- Dr Owen David Donald – For significant service to community and public housing, and to urban research.
- Professor Anthony Elliott – For significant service to education, and to social science policy and research.
- Dr Caroline Jane Elliott – For significant service to medicine, and to women's health.
- Benjamin Charles Elton – For significant service to the entertainment industry as a comedian, actor, writer and director.
- Rita Erlich – For significant service to the tourism and hospitality industry in Victoria.
- Rosalind Mary Escott – For significant service to women's health, and to the community.
- Helen Fejo-Frith – For significant service to the Indigenous community of the Northern Territory.
- Dale Allyson Fisher – For significant service to medicine, to health care management, and to nursing.
- Professor Maria Forsyth – For significant service to chemistry education, research and scholarship.
- Rodney Winston Fox – For significant service to tourism, and to shark biology.
- Dr George Michael Galvin, RFD – For significant service to military history, to governance in sport, and to emergency medicine.
- The Honourable Duncan John Gay – For significant service to the people and Parliament of New South Wales, and to the community.
- Christine Alexia Gee – For significant service to the community, particularly through hospital administration.
- Sunita Gloster – For significant service to the media and marketing industry, and to gender equality.
- Marina Simone Go – For significant service to business governance, to sport administration, and to the media industry.
- Sean Anthony Gordon – For significant service to the Indigenous community as an advocate for equity.
- Dr Genevieve Anne Goulding – For significant service to anaesthesiology through professional and clinical roles.
- Dr Pamela Jane Gower – For significant service to dentistry, and to forensic odontology.
- Beth Evelyn Graham – For significant service to the bilingual education of Indigenous language speaking students.
- Noel Gregory Graham – For significant service to agriculture through the rice growing industry.
- Professor Joanne Elizabeth Gray – For significant service to education, and to the midwifery profession.
- The Honourable Kevin Patrick Greene – For significant service to the Parliament of New South Wales, to local government, and to the community.
- Antony Baron Greenwood – For significant service to the Anglican Church, and governance and legal advisory organisations.
- Councillor Julie Ann Marie Griffiths – For significant service to local government, to women's football, and to industrial relations.
- Kathleen Mary Grigg – For significant service to financial governance, to tertiary education, and to the agricultural industry.
- Dr Roger Gordon Grigg – For significant service to medicine in the field of otolaryngology head and neck surgery.
- Dr Victoria (Tiggy) Louise Grillo – For significant service to conservation through education, research and leadership roles.
- The late Richard Grills – For significant service to community eye health, and to the ophthalmic optics industry.
- Professor Michele Bianca Grossman – For significant service to tertiary education, particularly to research, and to social welfare initiatives.
- Emeritus Professor Raphael Hilary Grzebieta – For significant service to the transport industry through road safety research and promotion.
- Professor Terry Haines – For significant service to medical education and research into fall prevention and mobility.
- Graham Michael Hall – For significant service to dentistry as an oral and maxillofacial surgeon.
- Dr Peter Rex Harcourt, OAM – For significant service to sports and exercise medicine, and to anti-doping monitoring.
- Professor Warren John Harding – For significant service to business, to community health, and to the information technology industry.
- Professor Mark Hargreaves – For significant service to tertiary education, to sports administration, and to physiology.
- Anna Maria Harrison – For significant service to multiculturalism in Western Australia, and to aged care.
- Geoffrey Albert Head – For significant service to medical research into high blood pressure diagnosis and management.
- Michaela Healey – For significant service to social enterprise and to not-for-profit organisations.
- Karen Louise Heap – For significant service to the Indigenous community in a range of roles.
- Professor Rodney John Hicks – For significant service to nuclear medicine through a range of international and national roles.
- Dr Neville Tom Highett – For significant service to education in South Australia, and to the community.
- Dr David Hill – For significant service to paediatric medicine in the fields of allergy and respiratory biology.
- Councillor Jennifer Lorraine Hill – For significant service to local government, and to the community of Townsville.
- Terry Hill – For significant service to primary industry, to public administration, and to the agricultural sector.
- Conjoint Professor Arthur Ho – For significant service to optometry as a researcher, designer and educator.
- Roger Clive Hodgman – For significant service to the performing arts as a director.
- Joanna Elizabeth Horgan – For significant service to retail business, and to women in executive roles.
- Hedley Leyland Hoskinson – For significant service to the beekeeping and honey industry.
- Kelly Ann Howlett – For significant service to local government, and to the community of Port Hedland.
- Caroline Hughes – For significant service to the Indigenous community of Canberra.
- Dr David Charles Hughes – For significant service to sports medicine as an administrator and elite athlete physician.
- Scientia Professor Rebecca Ivers – For significant service to community health through injury prevention research and education.
- The Honourable Judith Louise Jackson – For significant service to the people and Parliament of Tasmania.
- Dr Michael Magnus Jay – For significant service to otolaryngology, to head and neck surgery, and to professional bodies.
- Melinda (Jane) Jeffreys – For significant service to the community of South Australia through a range of roles.
- Lindsay Johnston – For significant service to architectural building and design education.
- Dr Richard Frederick Jones – For significant service to medicine in the field of spinal injury and rehabilitation.
- Angela Jeanne Karpin – For significant service to the judiciary, and to the law, and to mental health governance.
- Katherine Kennedy – For significant service to the community through charitable organisations.
- Associate Professor Gary Kilov – For significant service to medicine, particularly diabetes research and advisory roles.
- Dr John Thomas Kirk – For significant service to oenology, and to professional associations.
- Dr David Montgomery Knox – For significant service to the financial sector.
- Emeritus Professor Peter Langridge – For significant service to science in the field of plant genomics and agriculture.
- Dr Anna Lavelle – For significant service to science and innovation through a range of roles.
- Dr Kevin John Laws – For significant service to professional learning for tertiary educators in Southeast Asia.
- Roger Leach – For significant service to the aviation transport industry.
- Dr Nicky Leap – For significant service to midwifery as a clinician and educator.
- Simone Dorothea Leyden – For significant service to community health, particularly through neuroendocrine cancer organisations.
- Professor Liza Lim – For significant service to the performing arts as a music composer and academic.
- The Honourable Justice Geoffrey Charles Lindsay – For significant service to the judiciary, the law, and to the legal profession.
- Dr William Anthony Lord – For significant service to paramedicine, particularly research and education.
- The late Wendy Maree Lovelace – For significant service to community health, and to disability advocacy.
- Anne Joan Loveridge – For significant service to theatre administration, and to business.
- Judith Lucy – For significant service to the performing arts as an entertainer.
- The Honourable Ian Douglas Macdonald – For significant service to the people and Parliament of Australia, to local government, and to the community of Northern Australia.
- Kerryn Elaine Manning – For significant service to harness racing, and to ovarian cancer awareness.
- Mary Patricia Marsland, PSM – For significant service to architecture in a range of roles.
- Bronte Louise Martin – For significant service to trauma and emergency response nursing in a range of roles.
- Professor Peter John Martin, APM – For significant service to public administration in Queensland.
- Emma Matthews – For significant service to the performing arts, particularly opera.
- Professor Richard Phillip Mattick – For significant service to drug and alcohol research through education and social policy, and to medical organisations.
- Professor Danielle Mazza – For significant service to medicine and to medical research, particularly to women's health.
- The late Robert John Meadows, KC – For significant service to the law and the legal profession in Western Australia.
- The Honourable Justice Timothy John Moore – For significant service to the judiciary and to the law, to the Parliament of New South Wales, and to industrial relations.
- Dr Philip Anthony Moses – For significant service to the veterinary profession as a doctor, administrator and educator.
- The Honourable Graham Robert Mullane – For significant service to the judiciary, and to the law, and to the community.
- Alexander (Sandy) John Mackenzie – For significant service to the people and Parliament of Australia, to education, and to conservation.
- Emeritus Professor Lindy Leah McAllister – For significant service to speech pathology and allied health in a range of roles.
- Jane Frances McAloon – For significant service to the business and energy sectors.
- John McGagh – For significant service to the mining sector as a chemical engineer.
- Dr Michael Anthony McGrath – For significant service to medicine as a vascular specialist.
- Jill McIntosh – For significant service to netball, particularly as a coach at the national and international level.
- Professor Jennifer Margaret McKay – For significant service to the law, and to the legal profession.
- Dr William John McKay – For significant service to medical administration in the field of nuclear medicine.
- The Honourable Maxine Margaret McKew – For significant service to journalism, to higher education, and to the Parliament of Australia.
- June McLoughlin – For significant service to child advocacy and early learning.
- The Honourable Patrick John McNamara – For significant service to rowing, to the Parliament of Victoria, and to the community through a range of roles.
- Professor Harshal Nandurkar – For significant service to medicine, particularly as a haematologist.
- Professor David Glen Newman – For significant service to aerospace medicine.
- Margery Anne Nicoll – For significant service to the law, and to the legal profession.
- Professor Iona Novak – For significant service to medical research, particularly the treatment of cerebral palsy.
- Dr Michele Anne O'Brien – For significant service to medicine, particularly as an anaesthetist.
- Professor Emerita Patricia Mary O'Brien – For significant service to people with disability through research and education.
- Anne-Marie O'Loghlin – For significant service to the finance sector, to women, and to the community.
- Martin O'Shannessy – For significant service to social research and public polling.
- Emeritus Professor Robyn Anne Owens – For significant service to science in the fields of computer vision and mathematics.
- Anthea Kaye Pavy – For significant service to the community through a range of roles.
- Kris Elizabeth Peach – For significant service to the accountancy profession, and to the community.
- Noel John Pearce – For significant service to cycling, and to community sport through a range of roles.
- Professor Alice Pebay – For significant service to science, particularly through stem cell and neuroscience research.
- Professor Anna Peeters – For significant service to community health, particularly obesity research.
- Leonidas Earlston Pericles – For significant service to the visual arts.
- Russell William Pettis – For significant service to veterans and their families.
- Ruth Picker – For significant service to the accountancy profession, and to the financial sector.
- Marina Prior – For significant service to musical theatre as a singer and performer.
- Pamela Rabe – For significant service to the performing arts as a performer and director.
- Rose-Marie Radley – For significant service to community health, and to the nursing profession.
- Dr James George Renwick, CSC SC, RAN – For significant service to the law, and to national security.
- Dr Elizabeth Dell Rickman – For significant service to medicine through women's health, and to the community.
- Jillian Michelle Riseley – For significant service to the not-for-profit sector, and to corporate sustainability.
- Scientia Professor John Heath Roberts – For significant service to tertiary education, and to business and management.
- Fiona Ann Robertson – For significant service to the mining sector.
- Dr Diana Gai Robinson – For significant service to sports medicine as a physician and to anti-doping regulation.
- Professor Joanna Robinson – For significant service to community health, through suicide prevention awareness and support.
- Distinguished Professor Sharon Robinson – For significant service to science, particularly the study of Antarctic environmental change.
- Katie Louise Roffey – For significant service to sport administration, and to the community.
- Dr Peter Rogers – For significant service to engineering, to education, and to the community.
- Associate Professor Louis Roller – For significant service to the pharmacy profession through education and governance.
- Professor Renae Monique Ryan – For significant service to biomedical science as a researcher, and to diversity and inclusion.
- Dr Paul John Sambrook – For significant service to dentistry as a clinician and academic.
- Denise Margaret Scott – For significant service to the arts as a comedian and actress.
- Russell John Scrimshaw – For significant service to community health, and to business governance.
- Wendy Sharpe – For significant service to the visual arts, and to the community.
- Clinical Associate Professor Magdalena Simonis – For significant service to medicine through a range of roles, and to women's health.
- Emeritus Professor Andrew James Sinclair – For significant service to community health in the field of nutrition.
- Associate Professor George Andrew Skowronski – For significant service to intensive care medicine, and to medical research.
- Gary Patrick Smith – For significant service to medical administration, and to professional organisations.
- Distinguished Professor Justine Ruth Smith – For significant service to ophthalmology, particularly research and education.
- Jane Fitzgerald Spring – For significant service to disability advocacy in sport, and to public sector administration.
- Miriam Erin Stanborough – For significant service to the minerals and mining sector, and to the community.
- Kristin Mary Stegley, OAM – For significant service to heritage advocacy, and to the community.
- Sarah Stegley – For significant service to the community through a range of organisations.
- Dr Stephen James Steigrad – For significant service to medicine particularly in a range of national and international organisations.
- His Honour Michael John Strong – For significant service to the law, and to the community.
- Peter James Strong – For significant service to the small business sector, and to the community.
- Hiroe Swen – For significant service to ceramic art as a teacher and an artist.
- The Right Reverend Alison Menzies Taylor – For significant service to the Anglican Church, and to conservation.
- Ronald Keith Thomas – For significant service to the performing arts, particularly through music.
- John Murray Thompson – For significant service to industrial relations in the building and construction industry.
- Kaye Olwyn Thurlow – For significant service to the Indigenous community of East Arnhem Land.
- Dr Philip Arthur Tideman – For significant service to rural and remote medicine.
- Dr Alison Velyian Todd – For significant service to medical research, and to tertiary education.
- Professor Michael Alan Tonkin – For significant service to medicine as a hand surgeon, and to professional associations.
- Dr Duncan Jake Topliss – For significant service to endocrinology, and to professional organisations.
- Angela Toppin – For significant service to local government, and to secondary education.
- George Torbay – For significant service to the performing arts through music in a range of roles.
- Professor Emerita Sally Katherine Tracy – For significant service to tertiary education, and to midwifery.
- Dr Barry John Traill – For significant service to conservation and the environment in a range of roles.
- Scientia Professor Carla Justine Treloar – For significant service to social research, and to tertiary education.
- Abigail Trewin – For significant service to the community through disaster response organisations.
- Emeritus Professor John Charles Trinder – For significant service to tertiary education, and to professional associations.
- Edwin Keith Tucker – For significant service to community health, and to the technology sector.
- Pia Turcinov – For significant service to technology and innovation, and to women in STEM.
- Christopher Charles Vonwiller – For significant service to science and technology development.
- Dr Julia Patricia Vonwiller – For significant service to science and technology development.
- Emeritus Professor Phil Mary Waite – For significant service to medical science, and to tertiary education.
- Associate Professor Ping Wang – For significant service to the arts, and to classical literature.
- Emeritus Professor Josephine Anne Ward – For significant service to tertiary education, and to science.
- Helen Wellings – For significant service to the media, and to consumer affairs.
- Dr Robert Michael Whitby – For significant service to medicine in the field of infectious diseases, and to tertiary education.
- Professor Gail Elizabeth Whiteford – For significant service to tertiary education, and to community health.
- Dr Kenneth Rowland Whiting – For significant service to paediatric medicine, and to neurodevelopmental disorder organisations.
- Merilyn Susanne Wickes – For significant service to the community through a range of roles and organisations.
- Professor Simon Mark Willcock – For significant service to primary health care, and to tertiary education.
- Amanda Marie Wilson – For significant service to the community, and to the media and communications sector.
- Dr Geoffrey Wilson – For significant service to the community through charitable organisations.
- Suzanne Ruth Wilson – For significant service to the Indigenous community, to the book industry, and to education.
- Amanda Wojtowicz – For significant service to performing arts administration, and to tertiary education.
- Caroline Wood – For significant service to literature as a publisher, and to the community through a range of roles.
- Professor Margaret Rosemary Zacharin, OAM – For significant service to medicine, particularly paediatric endocrinology.
- Dr Sharonne Zaks – For significant service to dentistry, and to the arts.

==== Military Division ====
Navy

- Commodore Nicole Moyneen Curtis, RAN – For exceptional service to the Australian Defence Force in operational health, policy and capability.

Army

- Brigadier Ashley Raymond Collingburn, DSM – For exceptional performance of duty as Director Sensitive and Strategic Issues Management - Army, Commander 1st Brigade, and as the Global Interest Branch Head, Department of the Prime Minister and Cabinet.
- Colonel Timothy Sean Connolly, CSC & Bar – For exceptional service to the Australian Army in the field of Aviation Capability Management.
- Major General Michael Cowen, KC – For exceptional service as Chief Judge Advocate of the Australian Defence Force.
- Brigadier Warren Mark Gould – For exceptional service to the Australian Defence Force's command and control framework as Director General Joint Command and Control and Director General Systems and Integration - Army.
- Colonel Andrew Richard Langford – For exceptional service as Commanding Officer Joint Proof and Experimental Unit, and Deputy Director then Director Land Combat Support Program.
- Brigadier Hugh Walter Meggitt, CSC – For exceptional service to the Australian Defence Force in capability development, modernisation and diplomatic relations.
- Brigadier Glenn James Ryan, CSC and Bar – For exceptional performance of duty as Colonel Operations and Director General Training and Doctrine at Headquarters Forces Command.

Air Force

- Warrant Officer Geoffrey Neil Armstrong – For exceptional service in development and implementation of personnel and capability management software tools in the Royal Australian Air Force.
- Wing Commander Darren Dolan – For exceptional service in combat support, organisational development and training delivery for the Australian Defence Force.
- Air Vice-Marshal Carl Newman – For exceptional service in Air Mobility capability development for the Australian Defence Force.

=== Medal of the Order of Australia (OAM) ===
==== General Division ====
- Rowena Alisa Abbey – For service to local government, and to the community of Yass.
- Cecilia Alfonso – For service to the arts through administrative roles.
- Vivienne Allanson – For service to the aged care sector.
- Graham Richard Alliband – For service to the international community of Vietnam.
- Vanessa Anderson – For service to the community through charitable organisations.
- Professor Julie Andrews – For service to tertiary education.
- Ella Angarane – For service to women's Australian rules football.
- Costa Angelkov – For service to the Macedonian community of Western Australia.
- Damiano Antenucci – For service to secondary education through a range of roles.
- Lurline Archay – For service to information technology.
- Jennifer Jean Armstrong – For service to the community of Dubbo.
- Miranda Armstrong – For service to the community through social welfare organisations.
- John Raymond Arnold – For service to the welfare of veterans.
- Pamela Dawn Ashman – For service to the community of Port Pirie, and to sport.
- Maya Avdibegovic – For service to the community through social welfare organisations.
- Theodore John Bacalakis – For service to the Greek community of Queensland.
- Dr Charles Roger Badham – For service to science as a meteorologist.
- Gillian Bailey-Graham – For service to the performing arts, particularly through music.
- Bortolo (Tas) Baitieri – For service to rugby league through administrative roles.
- Michael Bakker – For service to secondary education.
- Robert Francis Baldock – For service to motor sports, and to youth.
- Colin Ball – For service to surf lifesaving.
- Judith Bandidt – For service to the community of Goomeri.
- Ebenezer Banful – For service to the African community, and to health.
- Helen Banu-Lawrence – For service to youth, and to community health.
- Dr Andrew William Barling – For service to community health.
- Ross Hamilton Barnett – For service to multicultural affairs in Victoria.
- Gregg Ian Barr-Jones – For service to the community through a range of organisations.
- Venerable Canon Katherine Dianne Barrett-Lennard – For service to the Anglican Church of Australia.
- William James Barrows, BM – For service to motor sports.
- Ulrike Tobetha Bartels – For service to the community through a range of organisations.
- Ken Barwick – For service to secondary education.
- Miriam Bass – For service to the Jewish community.
- Associate Professor Josephine Beatson – For service to psychiatry.
- Dr Sophie Beaumont – For service to dentistry.
- Dr Margaret Joy Beavis – For service to the community through a range of roles.
- Wendy Janeene Bebbington – For service to women, and to the community.
- Ronlyn Nancye Benbow – For service to the community through charitable organisations.
- Susai Mathew Benjamin – For service to the law, and to the community.
- The late John Henry Bennett – For service to the community through a range of roles.
- Dr Virendra Kumar Berera – For service to the Indian community of Victoria.
- Julie Anne Bertram – For service to early childhood education.
- Graeme Berwick – For service to the community through charitable organisations.
- Alan David Beveridge – For service to surf lifesaving.
- Heather Bieman – For service to music through teaching.
- Ross William Bingham – For service to the community through charitable organisations.
- Christopher John Binks – For service to secondary education, and to literature.
- Leslie Thomas Binns – For service to the performing arts through production roles.
- Terese Ann Binns – For service to veterans, and to the community.
- Peter Douglas Blacker – For service to the community through a range of roles.
- The Very Reverend Dr Stuart Edward Blackler – For service to the Anglican Church of Australia.
- Janice Edna Blizzard – For service to motor sports.
- Catherine Margaret Bohm – For service to the community, particularly through the church.
- Lesley Martin Bohm – For service to the community, particularly through the church.
- Arthur Raymond Booth – For service to community of Wollongong.
- Lyn Maree Brady – For service to the community of Bathurst.
- Dr Stuart Braga – For service to education administration, and to community history.
- Geoffrey Stuart Bransbury – For service to the community of Beaumaris.
- Pam Brock – For service to the community as a church bell ringer.
- Elly Helen Brooks – For service to the Jewish community.
- Graham Thomas Brown – For service to rugby union.
- Helen Rose Brown – For service to the Indigenous community of the Yamba region.
- The Honourable David Gordon Brownhill – For service to the Parliament of Australia.
- Dr Jennifer Buckingham – For service to educational research and literacy.
- Lynette Buckley – For service to youth through Girl Guides.
- Gina Bundle – For service to the Indigenous community of Victoria.
- Josephine Cecily Burkett – For service to the communities of Boyne Island and Tannum Sands.
- Leonie Elizabeth Burrows – For service to the community of Mildura.
- Lorraine Anne Burt – For service to veterans and their families.
- Donna Burton – For service to science, particularly astronomy.
- Rebecca Bushby – For service to conservation and the environment.
- Kevin David Bye – For service to lawn bowls, and to the community.
- Leon Robert Byner – For service to radio broadcast media.
- Ruth Byrne – For service to conservation and the environment.
- Robyn Cahill – For service to community health.
- Craig James Caldicott – For service to surf lifesaving, and to the law.
- Ian Leslie Caldwell – For service to cricket, and to professional organisations.
- Dr Tracey Evelyn Callinan – For service to the performing arts, and to the community.
- Dr William Ian Cameron – For service to medical administration, and to rural and Indigenous health.
- Elizabeth Anne Campbell – For service to local government, and to the community of Kempsey.
- Barry Leonard Campton – For service to veterans and their families.
- Angelina (Lina) Caneva – For service to the community through charitable organisations.
- Suzanne Caragianis – For service to occupational therapy.
- Giovanna Cardamone – For service to the Italian community of the Illawarra region.
- Carol Anne Carey – For service to medical administration.
- Pauline Maree Carrigan – For service to youth.
- Alan James Carter – For service to the community through a range of organisations.
- Merle Carter – For service to the Indigenous community of Western Australia.
- Nicolo Catania – For service to the community through a range of roles.
- Anne Colleen Caterson – For service to surf lifesaving.
- Mark Edward Chambers – For service to public administration in Western Australia.
- The late Donald Barry Cheyne – For service to table tennis.
- Stephen David Chipkin – For service to the Jewish community of New South Wales.
- The late Brian William Chisholm – For service to the community of Berrigan.
- Dr Michael Yiu To Chow – For service to the community through a range of organisations.
- Julie Cini – For service to community health.
- Diana Margaret Clark – For service to the community of the Huon Valley region.
- John Christopher Clarke – For service to youth through Scouts.
- David William Clifton – For service to local government, and to the community of Cairns.
- Robert Peter Clynes – For service to the law, and to the legal profession.
- Alan Raynor Cole – For service to the community of Turramurra.
- Dr Paul Christopher Collett – For service to medical administration.
- William John Collidge, RFD – For service to youth, and to the community.
- John Colwill – For service to horticulture
- John Conaghan – For service to people with Huntington's Disease.
- Brendon Cook – For service to the advertising industry.
- Geoffrey Norman Coombe – For service to animal welfare.
- Carol Cooper – For service to the indigenous community of the Blue Mountains.
- Louise Cooper – For service to the Maori community of Sydney.
- The late Nicole Jane Cooper – For service to community health and patient advocacy.
- Dr Diana Elizabeth Coote – For service to medicine.
- Elizabeth Bothwell Corbett – For service to conservation and the environment.
- Dr Keith Douglas Corbett – For service to conservation and the environment.
- Tracey Renae Corbin-Matchett – For service to the arts, and to people with disability.
- George Cotis – For service to conservation and the environment.
- Dr Diana Cousens – For service to the Buddhist community.
- Robert Maskew Cowper – For service to cricket.
- The late Georgina Marea Crawford-Smith – For service to community health.
- Yvonne Anne Crestani – For service to community health.
- Diana Rosemary Creswell – For service to the community through a range of roles.
- Dr Gregory Brian Crosland – For service to dermatology, particularly in rural areas.
- John Malcolm Crosse – For service to sport fly fishing.
- John Joseph Crotty – For service to taxation reform.
- Catherine Margaret Crouch – For service to education administration.
- Vanya Alexandra Cullen – For service to viticulture and oenology.
- Margaret Dorothy Curnow – For service to special education, and to the community.
- Pauline Elizabeth D'Astoli – For service to the community through a range of roles.
- James Mark Dack – For service to youth.
- Vinod Daniel – For service to conservation and the environment.
- Frank Kirkwood Davey – For service to the communities of Merimbula and Pambula.
- Allan James Davies – For service to the community through charitable organisations.
- Dr Andrew Paul Davies – For service to medicine, and to the community.
- Franklin George Davies – For service to the community through a range of organisations.
- Juanita Ann Davies – For service to aged welfare.
- Lyn Margaret Davies – For service to the community through charitable organisations.
- Amy Dawes – For service to women's health, particularly to birth-related trauma.
- Mary Louise Day – For service to polocrosse.
- Joseph Aloysious De Souza – For service to the community through a range of roles.
- David Maurits De Vos – For service to the broadcast media as a journalist.
- John Thomas Delaney – For service to community health.
- Judith Rose Deboer – For service to the community through a range of organisations
- Gregory John Decker – For service to the welfare of veterans.
- John Anthony Dermer – For service to the creative arts, particularly as a ceramicist.
- Anneke Deutsch – For service to the community through a range of roles.
- William George Deveril – For service to the communities of Pambula and Merimbula.
- Dr Sunita Siddhu Dhindsa – For service to the Indian community of the Australian Capital Territory.
- Helen Ann Dilks – For service to music through pipe bands.
- Peter William Dixon – For service to baseball.
- Janelle Gae Dodd – For service to the community through a range of organisations
- John William Dodd – For service to the community, particularly through Rotary.
- Lynton George Donisthorpe – For service to cricket.
- Maria Elisabeth Dopheide – For service to the community through social welfare organisations.
- The late Peter Raymond Dowling – For service to primary industry.
- Rosemarie Draper – For service to the community through social welfare organisations.
- Jennifer Joy Duggan – For service to the community of Katherine.
- Dr Mary Louise Dunne – For service to medicine through a range of roles.
- John Fletcher Dunnet – For service to the print media industry.
- Wanda Margaret Dunnet – For service to the print media industry.
- The Reverend Barry James Dwyer – For service to the Catholic Diocese of Wilcannia-Forbes.
- David Frederick Earl – For service to surf lifesaving, and to karting.
- Emeritus Professor Rifaat Yassa Ebied – For service to education, particularly to Semitic studies.
- Dr Julie Mary Edwards – For service to the community through social welfare organisations.
- Phillipa Louise Edwards – For service to music through brass bands.
- John Scott Ellis – For service to the oenology industry.
- The late Dorothy Elmer – For service to netball.
- The late Kevin Percy Elms – For service to Australian rules football.
- Imam Alaa Elzokm – For service to the Islamic community.
- Julie Emerson – For service to the community through a range of roles.
- Philip Lance Endersbee – For service to the community through charitable organisations.
- Frances Evans – For service to surf lifesaving.
- Michelle Ewington – For service to the community through a range of roles.
- Jaishri Patricia Falcetta – For service to the community through social welfare organisations.
- Larry Fallon – For service to the community through a range of roles.
- Albert Falzon – For service to surfing, and to the visual arts.
- Norbert Fandry – For service to secondary education.
- Andrew Dean Fildes – For service to people with language-learning disability, and to the community.
- Kerry Finch – For service to the Parliament of Tasmania, and to the community.
- Jaclyne Edwina Fisher – For service to public administration, and to the community.
- Robert John Fitzgerald – For service to community of Blacktown.
- Trevor Fitzgerald – For service to the community of Busselton.
- Dr Julie (Kate) Catherine Fitzherbert – For service to conservation, and the environment.
- Helen Fitzroy – For service to the mining sector.
- Cheyne Flanagan – For service to wildlife preservation and conservation.
- Katharine Joanna Fletcher – For service to the community through social welfare organisations.
- David Thomas Floyd – For service to the community through a range of organisations.
- Annette Joy Forbes – For service to the community through a range of roles
- Dr Cameron Samuel Ford – For service to the law.
- Alexander James Forrest – For service to youth through Scouts.
- Steven Frank Fortey – For service to the community of Avoca Beach.
- Craig Campbell Fosdike – For service to primary education.
- Ross Stuart Fraser – For service to people living with cystic fibrosis.
- The late Dr Edgar David Freed – For service to medicine as a psychiatrist.
- Gilbert Harold Freeman – For service to conservation and the environment.
- Dr Meredith Joan Freeman – For service to conservation and the environment.
- Cedric Seymour Fuchs – For service to the real estate industry, and to philanthropy.
- Robyn Gail Fuhrmeister – For service to local government, and to the community of St George.
- Gaye Gadsden – For service to conservation and the environment.
- David (Ted) Edwin Gallagher – For service to surf lifesaving.
- Jacqueline Gaye Galloway – For service to the community through social welfare organisations.
- Dr Fergus William Gardiner – For service to medicine.
- Dr Trevor Dennis Gardner – For service to medicine through a range of roles.
- The late Allan Frederick Garside – For service to football.
- Marion Lorraine Gathercole – For service to the community of Subiaco.
- Claire Gazis – For service to the Greek and Cypriot communities of Victoria.
- Jean-Marc Genesi – For service to the community through a range of roles.
- Lisa Gerrard – For service to the performing arts through music.
- Robert Leonard Gersch – For service to local government, and to the community.
- Lesley Sharon Gild – For service to business and commerce in Ballarat.
- Stephen John Giles – For service to the small business sector.
- Barbara Gilfedder – For service to conservation and the environment.
- Jodie Gillett – For service to business in Ballarat.
- Dr Donald Allan Gilmour – For service to the forestry sector.
- Susan Mary Goddard – For service to nursing, particularly to skin cancer screening.
- Ian Bruce Godfrey – For service to tertiary education, and to music.
- Alethea Gold – For service to the community, particularly through humanitarian aid endeavours.
- Dr Clement Joseph Gordon – For service to medicine, and to the community.
- Christopher Grady – For service to aged welfare.
- Ian David Graham – For service to the community through a range of roles.
- Joan Esmarie Graham – For service to children as a foster carer.
- Ian Robert Grant – For service to surf lifesaving.
- The late Ivan George Gray – For service to the community of Nowra.
- Jennifer Dawn Gregory – For service to veterans and their families.
- Dr Madonna May Grehan – For service to nursing and midwifery history, and to the community.
- Ian Charles Grieve – For service to community history.
- Rosemary Ann Grieve – For service to business, and to women.
- Lorraine Griffiths – For service to children as a foster carer.
- Dr Margaret Grigg – For service to mental health through a range of roles.
- Robert John Grimson – For service to the community through a range of roles.
- Ruth Elaine Grimson – For service to the community of Liverpool.
- Elizabeth Anna Grist – For service to community health, and to nursing and midwifery.
- Penelope Jane Grist – For service to community history, and to the arts.
- Margaret Lee Grove – For service to the community through a range of organisations.
- Andrew Neil Guerin – For service to rowing, and to sports history.
- Suzanne Jane Guider – For service to the community through a range of organisations.
- Dr Rosemary Ann Hackworthy – For service to medicine as a cardiologist.
- Margaret Haggart – For service to the performing arts, and to the community.
- Andrea Jane Halas – For service to the community through a charitable organisation.
- Peter Halasz – For service to the community through charitable organisations.
- Linda Faye Hall – For service to the community of Boyne Island.
- Donald William Hamilton – For service to the community of Melbourne.
- Ian George Hamilton – For service to the community of Mackay.
- Penelope Sue Hamilton – For service to the community through social welfare organisations.
- Susanne Kaye Hamilton – For service to softball, and to lawn bowls.
- Pamela Gai Hamory – For service to the community of the Eurobodalla.
- Mainul Haque – For service to the multicultural community of Canberra.
- Diane Harapin – For service to children through adoption reform.
- Elizabeth Harrison Harding – For service to youth.
- Kim Elizabeth Harding – For service to the community through charitable organisations.
- Susanne Harris – For service to youth, particularly to young women.
- Colin Osborne Harrison – For service to music through brass bands.
- Linda Jane Harvey – For service to people who are deaf or hard of hearing.
- David Francis Hawdon – For service to the community through a range of roles.
- Robyn Hawes – For service to the community of Rookwood.
- Gai Hawthorn – For service to the community through a range of organisations.
- Susan Hayes – For service to literature, particularly as an administrator.
- Terence Malcolm Hayes – For service to the community of Gloucester.
- The Honourable Kenneth William Hayward – For service to the people and Parliament of Queensland.
- Geoffrey Stuart Heard – For service to Australian rules football.
- Ian Wilfred Heard – For service to the community of Warrnambool.
- William John Heazlett – For service to local government, and to the community of Walcha.
- Wayne John Henson – For service to horse racing, and to Australian rules football.
- Paula Ruth Herlihy – For service to the communities of Mount Evelyn and the Yarra Ranges.
- Peter Hersh – For service to the Jewish community.
- Robin Hewitt – For service to sailing.
- Kim Hill – For service to the community through emergency response organisations.
- John Hillel – For service to the Jewish community of Victoria.
- Jeffrey Douglas Hockley – For service to community theatre.
- Councillor Rosemary Linda Hodge – For service to local government, and to the community.
- Ian Blackburn Holdsworth – For service to the community through a range of organisations.
- The late Malcolm Gerard Hole – For service to local government, and to the community.
- Allan Maxwell Holmes – For service to the community through a range of organisations.
- Roslyn Horin – For service to the performing arts.
- Darryl (Sid) Brenton Hosking – For service to baseball.
- Christine Anne Howard-Bobenko – For service to the performing arts through dance.
- Anthony Owen Howes – For service to the community through a range of organisations.
- Mary Howlett – For service to the community, and to education.
- Dr Clive Anthony Hume – For service to medicine.
- Dr David Humphries – For service to sports medicine.
- Robyn Humphries – For service to community mental health.
- Jacqueline Irene Hyde – For service to women.
- Gordon James Hynes – For service to Australian rules football.
- Janet Mary Incoll – For service to conservation and the environment.
- Bruce Maxwell Ind – For service to the community through a range of roles.
- Janice Claire Irvine – For service to the community of Forster-Tuncurry.
- Aminul Islam – For service to community health.
- Narelda Jacobs – For service to the media, and to the community.
- John Robert Jacobson – For service to the community through a range of organisations.
- The late Richard Benn Jago – For service to the sheep industry.
- Carol Priscilla James – For service to the community of Goulburn Mulwaree.
- Dr Margaret Ellen James – For service to women through higher education.
- Robert Stewart James, ASM – For service to the community of Lancelin.
- Diane Helen Jameson – For service to the community.
- Dr Stephen James Jamieson – For service to medicine through a range of roles.
- Barrington Frederick Jarman – For service to Australia-Japan relations.
- Eugenie Anne Jelly – For service to nursing as a clinician and educator.
- Dagmar Anne Jenkins – For service to community health.
- Peter Royden Jenkins – For service to electrical engineering.
- Lesley Esther Johnson – For service to the community of Gunning.
- Michael Johnson – For service to music as a performer and teacher.
- Ronald Hill Johnson – For service to the community through music.
- Murray John Johnston – For service to education.
- Sandra Johnston – For service to community health.
- Howard Jones – For service to conservation and the environment.
- Dr Trevor Leslie Jordan – For service to the community through a range of roles.
- Astrid Jorgensen – For service to the community as a musical director.
- The late Dr Philomene Joshua Tenni – For service to community health.
- The late Kenneth Gordon Karsten – For service to the community of Weethalle.
- Mary Josephine Katter – For service to the community through a range of roles.
- John Michael Kavanagh – For service to local government, and to the community.
- Joan Phyllis Kelly – For service to the visual arts.
- Leslie James Kelly – For service to the community through emergency response organisations.
- Paul Christopher Kelly – For service to youth, and to the community.
- Margaret Hope Kendall – For service to the community of the Mornington Peninsula.
- Neil Kendall – For service to the financial planning sector.
- William Timothy Kendall – For service to the community of the Mornington Peninsula.
- Leonard John Kennedy – For service to the community through emergency response organisations.
- Lisa Emmanuella Kennett – For service to the Jewish community of Victoria.
- Rabbi Jonathan Malcolm Keren-Black – For service to the Jewish and wider community.
- David Bruce Kerr – For service to conservation and the environment.
- Abdullah Khan – For service to education, and to the multicultural community of Western Australia.
- Quentin Kilian – For service to the real estate industry.
- Emma King – For service to the community through social welfare organisations.
- Neil Kinsey – For service to the community, and to music.
- Richard Leslie Kirby – For service to golf.
- Michelle Kleinert – For service to local government, and to the community of Melbourne.
- Wanda Sophia Kluke – For service to the community through social welfare organisations.
- Miriam Knee – For service to cricket.
- John Rupert Knight – For service to the community through a range of organisations.
- Karyl Denise Knight – For service to local government, and to the community of the Greater Hume region.
- Antonios Stavros Koufos – For service to the Greek community of Western Australia.
- Ian Alan Langdon – For service to the community, and to primary industry.
- Peter Eric Lawley – For service to veterans and their families.
- Jamie Ennis Lawson – For service to music through brass bands.
- Beverley Leahy – For service to the community of Canberra.
- Stephen John Leahy – For service to the community through emergency response organisations.
- Allan Nelson Leaver – For service to railway heritage.
- Dr Mi Kyung Lee – For service to education, to public health, and to the Korean-Australian community.
- Sharon Leonard – For service to the community of Ravenswood.
- William McDonald Leonard – For service to community history through boat restoration.
- Rita Lepedjian – For service to the community through a range of organisations.
- Brian Leonard Leslie – For service to the dairy cattle industry.
- Dr Susan Elizabeth Lester – For service to the community through a range of organisations.
- Brenton John Lewis – For service to the community of Murray Bridge.
- Caroline Lewis – For service to the Jewish community of Sydney.
- Peter Mark Lewis – For service to the community through a range of organisations.
- Cora Lijnders – For service to the community through the church.
- Wendy Annette Lindgren – For service to the community through a range of organisations.
- Michele Lipner – For service to the community through a range of charitable organisations.
- Paul Robert Little – For service to the local government, and to the community of Gawler.
- Glenda Jean Lloyd – For service to children, and to the community.
- Jennifer Elizabeth Logie – For service to the community of Bicheno.
- Judy Lowy – For service to the Jewish community.
- Thomas Eric Ludwick – For service to the community through a range of organisations.
- Matthew Lutton – For service to the performing arts as a director.
- Anthony Macali – For service to community health.
- Donald Wilson Mackay – For service to the arts.
- Catherine Malone – For service to the church, and to the community of Wagga Wagga.
- Dr Gregory John Marcar – For service to medicine through a range of roles.
- Heather Mary Marcus – For service to local government, and to the community of Wyndham.
- Margaret Bernice Markovic – For service to road trauma, and safety initiatives.
- Stephen Graham Marks – For service to the community through a range of roles.
- Joan Marr – For service to dance as a teacher.
- Thomas Barrett Marr – For service to dance as a teacher, and to the community.
- Douglas Donald Marsen – For service to veterans.
- Carol Martin – For service to the Parliament of Western Australia, and to the Indigenous community.
- Gail June Matthews – For service to community health.
- Gregory Mawkes, MBE – For service to veterans.
- Pamela June Mawson – For service to the community through a range of organisations.
- Michael Paul Mazengarb – For service to the community through a range of organisations.
- Christine Ann Mead – For service to international relations, and to the community.
- Dr Frank Olaf Meumann – For service to medicine.
- Robert Maxwell Millen – For service to youth through Scouts.
- Peter Oliver Milling – For service to the livestock industry.
- Brian John Minney – For service to local government, and to the community.
- Diana Moehead – For service to youth through Girl Guides, and to the community.
- Dr Micheal Monsour – For service to medicine.
- Geoffrey Lewis Moore – For service to athletics.
- Gloria Angelica Morales Segovia – For service to the arts through administrative roles.
- Bruce James Morley – For service to the community through a range of organisations.
- Toby Morrell – For service to cricket.
- Michael Solomon Morris – For service to the Jewish community of Parramatta.
- Dr Stephen John Morris – For service to medicine.
- Colonel Anthony John Morton (Retd) – For service to war widows and their families.
- Belinda Jane Moss – For service to education.
- Esme Shirley Moulds – For service to social welfare support.
- Anne Muir – For service to the community as a social welfare advocate.
- Donald David Murchie – For service to the community through a range of service organisations.
- Detective Senior Sergeant Joy Lynette Murphy, APM – For service to the community through emergency response organisations.
- Adele Lena Macdonald – For service to hockey.
- Robyn Lesley Mackenzie – For service to the community of Eromanga, and to palaeontology.
- Stuart Alexander Mackenzie – For service to local government, and to the community of the Quilpie Shire.
- Fairlie Elizabeth Maclaine – For service to the community through a range of organisations.
- Sandra Macneil – For service to the community of Greensborough through a range of roles.
- Audrey Diane McCallum – For service to the community through a range of organisations.
- Ross James McConachie – For service to Australia-Japan relations, and to business.
- Robert Alexander McCosker – For service to the community through a range of organisations.
- Mark James McDonnell – For service to the community through charitable initiatives.
- Jennifer Maisie McDuff – For service to the arts, particularly in the Bundaberg region.
- Dr Forbes McGain – For service to medicine.
- Leisa Maree McGivern – For service to children as a foster carer.
- Trudy Jane McGowan – For service to Australians through consular support.
- Sue McGrady – For service to the community of Sydney during the Covid-19 pandemic.
- Ann Marion McGregor – For service to conservation and the environment.
- Kathleen Patricia McGurk – For service to the visual arts through administrative roles.
- Margaret Amanda McIlroy – For service to the community of Kingsley through sport.
- Kenneth John McInerney – For service to local government, and to the community.
- Rosemary McKenry – For service to education.
- Gwladys Olive McLachlan – For service to oral history, and to the community.
- Donald Cameron McLardy – For service to charitable organisations, and to Australian rules football.
- Jennefer Jane McLean – For service to animal welfare, and to landcare management.
- Patricia Edith McMahon – For service to the community through a range of organisations.
- Lisa McManus – For service to people with disability.
- Lyndall McNally – For service to the community of Lane Cove.
- Neil Athol McPherson – For service to the community through a range of organisations.
- Councillor Ruth Elizabeth McRae – For service to local government, and the Murrumbidgee community.
- Jennifer Louise McVeity – For service to literacy education as an author and publisher.
- Dr Saba Nabi – For service to community health, education and multicultural affairs.
- Shane Robert Neaves – For service to aged welfare.
- Dawn Elizabeth Nelson-Furnell – For service to archery.
- Jeffrey Howard Newman – For service to philately.
- Dr Carol Newnham – For service to community health as a neuropsychologist.
- Lynton Patrick Nicholas – For service to the community through a range of organisations.
- Rieny Anthony Nieuwenhof – For service to veterans and their families, and to the community.
- Timothy John North, KC – For service to rugby union, and to the law.
- Jasper Daniel Norton – For service to agriculture, and to the community.
- Juliette O'Brien – For service to journalism, and to community health.
- Patrick Anthony O'Brien – For service to the hospitality industry.
- Terry Luellen O'Brien – For service to education.
- Dr Irene O'Connell – For service to the law.
- Dr Brett O'Donnell – For service to ophthalmology.
- Jordan O'Reilly – For service to the disability community.
- Bernard Ollis – For service to the visual arts, and to education.
- Craig Geoffrey Osborne – For service to the community of the Illawarra region.
- Susan Ruth Owen – For service to community health.
- Judith Oyston – For service to horticulture.
- The late Timothy Page – For service to photojournalism.
- Wendy Page – For service to journalism.
- Gail Paratz – For service to the Jewish community, and to interfaith relations.
- The Reverend Kenneth William Parker – For service to the Anglican Church of Australia.
- Heather June Parry – For service to the community of Isis.
- Jill Margaret Pascoe – For service to community health.
- Sharon Paten – For service to the Indigenous community of Victoria.
- Kevin Michael Pattel – For service to the road transport industry, and to the community of Richmond.
- The Honourable Muriel Grace Patterson – For service to the Parliament of Western Australia.
- Dr Cyril Edgar Payne – For service to the community through a range of roles.
- Anthony William Peake – For service to the community through a range of organisations.
- Jane Marychurch Pennington – For service to youth, and to the community through service organisations.
- Simon Pennington – For service to rowing.
- Cheryl Penrith – For service to the Indigenous community of the Riverina region.
- Salvatore Petroccitto – For service to the transport industry.
- Geoffrey Gordon Phillips – For service to the broadcast media, and to the community.
- Dr Maria Teresa Piccioli – For service to education, and to the Italian community of Sydney.
- Mechel Pikoulas – For service to education.
- Andrew David Pittaway – For service to military history.
- Virginia Pitts – For service to the multicultural communities of the Peel region.
- Kenneth William Piva – For service to the community through a range of organisations.
- Kenneth Frank Pocock – For service to oenology.
- Ann Polis – For service to the community through a range of organisations.
- Allan James Polkinghorne – For service to basketball.
- Juliet Mary Ponder – For service to education, and to the community.
- Gayle Porter – For service to community health as a speech pathologist.
- Sonia Posenelli – For service to community health.
- Angelica Anna Poulos – For service to the Greek community of Darwin.
- Efstratios Poulos – For service to the Greek community of Darwin.
- Leo James Powell – For service to the community of the Shire of Moira.
- Dr Paul Gerard Power – For service to psychology.
- Kirsty Patricia Pratt – For service to the community through advocacy roles.
- Jeanette Pritchard – For service to youth, and to secondary education.
- Emeritus Professor Clive Trevor Probyn – For service to tertiary education.
- Heidi Joy Prowse – For service to community health.
- Terry Psarakis – For service to sport, particularly to cricket.
- Nishi Puri – For service to the Indian community of Canberra.
- Dr Michael James Pyne – For service to veterinary science.
- Dr Gerard Quigley – For service to medicine.
- Simon Alexander Quinn – For service to humanitarian repatriation initiatives.
- Vasilis Radis – For service to the Macedonian community of Western Australia.
- The late Dr Christine Ching-Rhu Ramsay – For service to the museums and gallery sector.
- Peter Keith Rankin – For service to ice skating.
- Peter Alan Rashleigh – For service to the law.
- Melissa Redsell – For service to social welfare.
- Susan Reppion-Brooke – For service to music education.
- Sharon Mary Reynolds – For service to pistol shooting.
- Stephen Benedict Reynolds – For service to the community through a range of organisations.
- Donald Gordon Rickerby – For service to horticulture.
- Jennifer Rickerby – For service to horticulture.
- Susan Margaret Rindfleish – For service to softball.
- Linda Rozelle Rive – For service to Indigenous oral history and languages.
- Maureen Merheb Rizk – For service to the community through charitable organisations.
- Louise Robert-Smith – For service to secondary education.
- Dr Noel Roberts – For service to anaesthesiology through a range of roles.
- Graeme Douglas Roberts-Thomson, MVO, RFD – For service to public administration.
- Christine Ann Robertson – For service to animal welfare.
- Keith Alan Roffey – For service to the community through a range of organisations.
- Associate Professor Kelly Lee Rogers – For service to medical research.
- John Rogerson – For service to the community through alcohol and drug awareness groups.
- Joan Roper – For service to the community of Broken Hill.
- Natalie Skye Rose – For service to the law.
- Gwenda Frances Rosengren – For service to people who are deaf or hard of hearing, and to education.
- Dr Norman Roth – For service to sexual health medicine.
- Donald Graham Rumbelow – For service to the community through a range of organisations.
- Lesley Angela Rumbelow – For service to the community through a range of organisations.
- Joseph John Russell – For service to veterans and their families.
- Julie Russell – For service to the road transport industry.
- Gregory Mark Ryan – For service to community health.
- John Stanislaus Ryan – For service to education as an administrator.
- Michael Walter Ryan – For service to the community through a range of organisations.
- Peter Clark Ryan – For service to dentistry.
- Wayne William Sachs ASM – For service to the community of the Gympie region.
- Muhammed Sadaruddean Sahu Khan – For service to the community, and to interfaith relations.
- Raoul David Salter – For service to the community through a range of organisations.
- Raymond Thomas Sandford – For service to veterans, and their families.
- Cody Schaeffer – For service to youth, and to the community of Queensland.
- Kerry Michael Schiemer – For service to aviation.
- Sophie Marie Scott – For service to the broadcast media, and to community health.
- Susan Lynette Seletto – For service to youth through a range of roles.
- Dr Jennifer Wynn Senior – For service to medicine.
- William Stuart Sergeant – For service to the LGBTIQplus community of South Australia.
- Margaret Larraine Shadforth Nicholls – For service to women, and to the community.
- Dr Margaret Shapiro – For service to community health.
- Barry Hood Sharrad – For service to the community of Pinnaroo.
- Ernest George Shave – For service to the community of Orange.
- Clifford William Sheridan – For service to the community of Young.
- Natalie Jeannine Shiel – For service to nursing.
- Peter John Shinton – For service to local government, and to the community of Coonabarabran.
- Alister Simpson – For service to equine art.
- The late Dr Michael Leo Simpson – For service to the community of Montville.
- The late Nia Sims – For service to community health.
- Dr Kenneth Edward Sinclair – For service to education through a range of organisations.
- Kevin James Sinden – For service to youth through Scouts.
- Richard John Sivyer – For service to rowing, and to the community.
- Dr Keith Henry Skilbeck – For service to the communities of Croydon and Mooroolbark.
- Annette Zouche Sloan – For service to music education.
- David Smallman – For service to the community of the Central Coast, and to cricket.
- Colin Victor Smith – For service to the preservation of political history.
- Dr Gregory Peel Smith – For service to the community through social welfare organisations.
- Marilyn Joy Smith – For service to the community through charitable organisations.
- Michele Blair Smith – For service to medical administration.
- Dr David Smyth – For service to the community through social welfare organisations.
- Patricia Mary Speed – For service to the community through a range of organisations.
- Craig John Spencer – For service to the community through a range of organisations.
- Melinda Spencer – For service to community health.
- Kalpana Sriram – For service to community mental health.
- Carla Stacey – For service to the community of Marrickville.
- Jean Honora Stafford – For service to the performing arts.
- Fiona Stager – For service to literature as a bookseller.
- John Stanley – For service to sailing.
- Robert Lindsay Steane – For service to local government, and to the community of Maroondah.
- Valmai Ruth Stewart – For service to communities of Camden, and Dubbo.
- Sylvia Fay Stewart-Muir – For service to the Indigenous community of Victoria.
- David Andrew Stidston – For service to youth through Scouts.
- Donald Frank Stiller – For service to the community of the Western Downs region, and to local government.
- Curtis Lee Stone – For service to the tourism, culinary, and hospitality industries.
- Associate Professor Noel Lee Stonehouse – For service to tertiary education, and to the community.
- Peter Stroud – For service to rowing.
- Jane Sulis – For service to the community, and to education.
- Jayne Therese Sunbird – For service to the community through a range of roles.
- Dr Dennis William Sundin – For service to medicine, and to hockey.
- Madonna Elizabeth Suter – For service to the community through a range of organisations.
- Roslyn Gae Swain – For service to local government, and to the community of Gunnedah.
- Edwin Vernon Taylor – For service to motor sports.
- Dushyanthi Thangiah – For service to the community through social welfare organisations.
- Phillip Howell Thomas – For service to basketball.
- Dr Robyn Thompson – For service to medicine, particularly as a midwife and breastfeeding specialist.
- Jane Elizabeth Thomson – For service to women within the oenology sector.
- Anne Thoroughgood – For service to the social history of women in rural areas.
- Anne Titterton – For service to rowing.
- Carolyn Emma Townsend – For service to the community through charitable organisations.
- Gary David Treeve – For service to veterans and their families.
- Jeannette Joy Tsoulos – For service to the Jewish community.
- Archibald Newlands Tudehope – For service to community health.
- John Harcourt Turner – For service to the people and Parliament of New South Wales.
- John Robert Turner – For service to surf lifesaving.
- Peter Tyrrell – For service to surveying, and to professional organisations.
- Edward Vann – For service to the community of Maleny.
- Linda Tamazin Vann – For service to the community of Maleny.
- Harold Leigh Venables – For service to the community through a range of organisations.
- David Reid Veness – For service to people living with Parkinson's disease.
- Arun Venkatesha – For service to the Indian community of Canberra.
- Phillip David Vickers – For service to local government, and to the community.
- Jane Elizabeth Vincent – For service to the community through a range of organisations.
- Bernice Lorraine Volz – For service to conservation and the environment.
- Alexander Gidaliahu Waislitz – For service to the community through a range of organisations.
- Sandra Carolyn Walker – For service to youth through Scouts.
- Francis Lawrence Wallace – For service to the community through a range of roles.
- Laurence Leonard Wallace – For service to community through a range of roles.
- Simon Hamilton Warrender – For service to the arts, and to the community.
- Valerie Jean Watters – For service to community history.
- Jennifer Robyn Weaver – For service to women through a range of organisations.
- Tracey Webster – For service to nursing, and to community health.
- Kenneth Leslie Wells – For service to the community of Murray Bridge.
- Kevin John Wendt – For service to children through a range of roles.
- Megan Weston – For service to local government, and to the community of Bruny Island.
- Margaret Whitchurch – For service to the community through a range of organisations.
- The late Ian Raymund White – For service to athletics.
- Janet Estelle White – For service to youth, and to the community of Townsville.
- Kenneth Henry White – For service to the community through social welfare organisations.
- Jillian Yvonne Whittaker – For significant service to local government, and to the community.
- Valerie Wilkinson – For service to gliding.
- Raymond Bruce Willett, ESM – For service to the community through emergency response organisations.
- Jennifer Helen Willetts – For service to the community through social welfare organisations.
- Beverly Williams – For service to education.
- Wendy Lynette Williams – For service to the community through a range of roles.
- Olya Willis – For service to community history.
- Bartholomew Edwin Willoughby – For service to the performing arts, particularly through music.
- Stephen Guy Wilmoth – For service to the law, and to the church.
- Alan Noel Wilson – For service to the community through a range of organisations.
- Rosalie Wilson – For service to athletics.
- Julie Maureen Wiltshire – For service to the community through a range of organisations.
- Koliana Leata Winchester – For service to local government, and to the community of Redcliffe.
- David Winter – For service to the community of Mont Albert, and Surrey Hills.
- Natalie Joy Wischer – For service to the community, particularly to people living with diabetes.
- Margaret Anne Wood – For service to swimming.
- Reverend Mee Won Yang – For service to the Baptist Church of Australia, and to refugee support services.
- Maureen York – For service to the community of Alice Springs.
- Vola Young – For service to the performing arts.
- Michael Constantine Zervos – For service to the community through charitable organisations.

==== Military Division ====
Navy

- Lieutenant Commander Anthony Ian McCann, RAN – For meritorious service in the field of Navy Aviation Engineering.

Army

- Major Francisco Vamarasi Aisake – For meritorious service in advancing the Regional Force Surveillance Group capability, enhancing Army's contribution to the national Closing the Gap strategy, and strengthening Australian Defence Force partnerships in the Southwest Pacific.
- Warrant Officer Class One Carryn Ann Eustace – For meritorious service as the Regimental Sergeant Major of the 3rd Health Support Battalion, 1st Close Health Battalion, and 1st Health Battalion, and as the Senior Instructor, Warrant Officer Training Team, Warrant Officer and Non Commissioned Officer Academy.
- Warrant Officer Class One Daniel George Hamilton – For meritorious performance of duty as a Regimental Sergeant Major in the Australian Army.
- Warrant Officer Class One Sharon Jayne Knight, CSM – For meritorious service as the Warrant Officer Decision and Assurance, Australian Defence Force Headquarters, Employment Category Advisor for Command Support Clerk at Army Logistic Training Centre and the Trade Conductor for Command Support Clerk.

==== Honorary ====
- Adina Allen – For service to the Jewish community of Melbourne.
- The late Samuel Lance Allen – For service to the Jewish community of Melbourne.
- Judith Donald – For service to education.
- Mary Philomena McBride – For service to the Irish community of Victoria.
- David John Phillips – For service to the community through service organisations.
- Josephine Stone – For service to conservation and the environment.

== Meritorious Service ==
=== Public Service Medal (PSM) ===
Public Service Medal ribbon

Commonwealth

- Graham Roy Archer – For outstanding public service through leadership to deliver nationally significant measures and reforms.
- Amanda-Lee Charlton – For outstanding public service through leadership during the COVID-19 pandemic.
- Sarah Jane Chidgey – For outstanding public service through policy development and law reform in integrity frameworks, criminal justice and national security.
- Greta Elizabeth Doherty – For outstanding public service to women's safety policy and programs.
- Justine Elizabeth Greig – For outstanding public service with the Department of Defence, and in senior policy roles.
- Margaret Ann Hayes – For outstanding public service in providing culturally safe access to aged care for First Nations people.
- Martin Thomas Hehir – For outstanding public service through commitment to stewardship and reform of national workplace relations and employment policy.
- Dac Huan Ho – For outstanding public service in providing data extraction for reporting during the COVID-19 pandemic.
- Elspeth Sarah Kay – For outstanding public service in response to the COVID-19 pandemic.
- Gaye Sharon Lalor – For outstanding public service in visa program delivery and the COVID-19 travel exemption program.
- Virginia Leitch – For outstanding public service in developing the business case for rehabilitation of the former Rum Jungle uranium mine.
- Grant Lovelock – For outstanding public service through contributions to the APS Workforce Strategy and the Australian Public Service Academy.
- Gerard David Martin – For outstanding public service in delivering advice and support to the Prime Minister and his Office, and to the Department of the Prime Minister and Cabinet.
- Christine Elizabeth McClelland – For outstanding public service in Early Childhood Intervention and improving the lives of young children with disability or developmental delay and their families.
- Melissa Jane Ryan – For outstanding public service through leadership and implementation of complex reform and policies to assist vulnerable Australians.
- Robert Barry Ryan – For outstanding public service through excellence in Aboriginal and Torres Strait Islander policy development and engagement.
- Dr Andrew John Stevenson – For outstanding public service through leadership and stewardship of Australia's astronomy capability.
- Cathy Anne Toze – For outstanding public service in leadership and commitment to support Australia's COVID-19 response.

Australian Capital Territory

- Bobby Antoniou – For outstanding public service to public health, as the Liaison Officer for the ACT COVID-19 Clinic Health Emergency Centre.
- Vanessa Lee Hoban – For outstanding public service to public health in the ACT's clinical response to COVID-19.
- Lana Carol Junakovic – For outstanding public service in developing improved workplace arrangements within the Office of the ACT Government Solicitor.
- Daniel James Lalor – For outstanding public service to public health as the Director of Pharmacy at Canberra Health Services.
- David Andrew Matthews – For outstanding public service in leading the ACT Education Directorate's transitions to remote learning and back to face-to-face learning.
- Stacey Narelle Matthews – For outstanding public service in supporting the ACT's Whole of Government COVID-19 response.
- Margaret Anne McManus – For outstanding public service to public health as the nursing lead for the ACT COVID@Home program.
- Melissa Kate O'Brien – For outstanding public service to public health through leadership and practical assistance to the ACT's COVID-19 response.
- Joshua Leonard Rynehart – For outstanding public service in leading Access Canberra's COVID-19 response.
- Ajay Sharma – For outstanding public service to finance, and in strengthening accountability and transparency throughout the ACT Public Service.
- Emily Springett – For outstanding public service in leading Access Canberra's COVID-19 response.
- Howard Douglas Wren, ASM – For outstanding public service to public health and leading the ACT Ambulance Service through the COVID-19 pandemic.

New South Wales

- Stuart Roy Campbell – For outstanding public service in coordinating the disaster response and recovery effort following the Northern Rivers floods.
- Amanda Chadwick – For outstanding public service to the water and local government sectors.
- Dr Ann Elizabeth Daly – For outstanding public service in educational innovation programs supporting Aboriginal and Torres Strait Islander students.
- Hannah Louise Damkar – For outstanding public service through communications leadership during the New South Wales 2019 - 2020 bushfires, COVID-19 pandemic and Northern Rivers floods.
- Terry James Dodds – For outstanding public service in local government leadership through emergency management.
- Paul Edward Hughes – For outstanding public service through leadership in the New South Wales public education system.
- Jacob Israel Jackson – For outstanding public service in the implementation of Rapid Antigen Screening for Corrective Services NSW.
- Sandra Anne Kubecka – For outstanding public service in the response to, and recovery efforts following, the Camden local government area floods.
- Daniel Joseph Leavy – For outstanding public service through improving vehicle and road safety across the New South Wales road network.
- Damon John Rees – For outstanding public service in customer service delivery, in particular COVID-19 related services.
- Denise Anne Robens – For outstanding public service in classroom teaching at Regentville Public School.
- Brett Anthony Stonestreet – For outstanding public service to the community of Griffith.
- Stephen John Thorpe – For outstanding public service in driving change and innovation in Corrective Services NSW.
- Sarah (Sally) Webb – For outstanding public service in the delivery of legal and governance advice in New South Wales, particularly across the COVID-19 pandemic response.

Northern Territory

- Jennilyn Ellen Daniel-Yee – For outstanding public service to the Northern Territory public sector.

Queensland

- Bernadette Louise Ditchfield – For outstanding public service during the COVID-19 pandemic for the protection and development of agribusiness in Queensland.
- Jodie Anne Elder – For outstanding public service to youth justice in Queensland.
- Matthew Bryan Higgins – For outstanding public service to Queensland with international impact in the fields of surveying, geodesy and spatial sciences.
- Malcolm Alexander Letts – For outstanding public service to state and national biosecurity.
- Professor Elizabeth Shirley McCready (Whiting) – For outstanding public service to healthcare in Queensland, particularly for aged care.
- Michael James Shearer – For outstanding public service to youth, community and families in regional Queensland.

South Australia

- Dr Jonathan Gorvett – For outstanding public service in emergency management and intergovernmental relations.
- Dr Christopher William Lease – For outstanding public service to the people of South Australia during the COVID-19 pandemic response.
- Dr Neil Frederick Maycock – For outstanding public service in providing safe and high-quality care for patients in public hospitals.
- Dr Kathleen Margaret Ophel-Keller – For outstanding public service to the agricultural industry through research and innovative leadership.

Victoria

- Ross David Broad – For outstanding public service to health, mental health and drug and alcohol policy development in Victoria.
- Dean Cowie – For outstanding public service in championing land justice for Aboriginal Traditional Owners.
- Elizabeth Mary Dyer – For outstanding public service in engagement with community service partners in servicing vulnerable children and young people.
- Melissa Sue Harris – For outstanding public service to state and local government, and for transformation in the areas of geospatial, planning and land administration in Victoria.
- Victoria Frances Hudson – For outstanding public service, particularly in the area of economic reform.
- Gerard Vincent Mansour – For outstanding public service in elevating the voice and experience of senior Victorians during the COVID-19 pandemic.
- James William McCann – For outstanding public service in leading and managing Victoria's Youth Justice Centres and driving their recovery and redevelopment.
- Ajay Satyan – For outstanding public service through leadership in delivering grants in response to the COVID-19 pandemic.
- Mark Anthony Stracey – For outstanding public service to the community during the COVID- 19 pandemic.
- Lee Watts – For outstanding public service to education in Victoria.

Western Australia

- Dr Paul Kenneth Armstrong – For outstanding public service through contributions to the health and wellbeing of Western Australians during the COVID-19 pandemic.
- Dr Margaret Mary Byrne – For outstanding public service in scientific leadership in conservation biology and genomics and integration with policy and management.
- Dr Tudor Adrian Codreanu – For outstanding public service through contributions to the Western Australian Government's response to the COVID-19 pandemic.
- David Phillip Etherton – For outstanding public service in coordination of support for the sporting, entertainment and creative industries in response to the COVID-19 pandemic.
- Helen Mary Gladstones – For outstanding public service through contributions to State security, and emergency preparedness and management.
- Dr Clare Margaret Huppatz – For outstanding public service through management of public health responses during the COVID-19 pandemic.
- Elizabeth Mary Macleod – For outstanding public service in the management of the health response during the COVID-19 pandemic.
- Anthony Xavier Sutton – For outstanding public service in supporting the sustainable development of the resources, minerals and energy sectors of Western Australia.

=== Australian Police Medal (APM) ===
Australian Police Medal ribbon

Australian Federal Police

- Assistant Commissioner Krissy Lee Barrett
- Superintendent Jason Alexander Byrnes
- Commander Joanne Lee Cameron
- Sergeant Mark Graham Spence
- Sergeant Keith Joseph Taylor

New South Wales Police Force

- Detective Superintendent Steven Paul Clarke
- Detective Inspector Virginia Margaret Gorman
- Detective Superintendent Albert John Joseph
- Assistant Commissioner Stacey Ann Maloney
- Detective Superintendent Bradley Richard Monk
- Sergeant Stephen David Rae
- Chief Inspector Paul Thomas Smith
- Detective Superintendent Grant William Taylor
- Detective Superintendent John Anthony Watson

Northern Territory Police Force

- Detective Senior Sergeant Mark Geoffrey Bland

Queensland Police Service

- Detective Superintendent Denzil Owen Clark
- Senior Sergeant Jamie Ray Horn
- Sergeant Toni Veronica Phelan
- Senior Sergeant Toni Guiseppe Poli
- Sergeant David William Raymond, BM
- Inspector Darren John Somerville
- Superintendent Anne Margaret Vogler

South Australia Police Force

- Chief Superintendent Graham Malcolm Goodwin, CSC
- Superintendent David William Scutchings
- Senior Sergeant Kelly-Anne Taylor

Tasmania Police Force

- Commander Peter Terence Harriss

Victoria Police

- Inspector Matthew Randal Anderson
- Senior Sergeant Dermot Patrick Avon
- Detective Superintendent Jacqueline Mary Curran
- Superintendent John Ormond Fitzpatrick
- Assistant Commissioner Christopher James Gilbert

Western Australia Police Force

- Detective Inspector Natalie Jane Palmer
- Acting Superintendent Dale Leanne Robinson
- Inspector Curtis Malcolm Roe
- Senior Sergeant Heath William Soutar
- Senior Sergeant Mark William Stoneman

=== Australian Fire Service Medal (AFSM) ===
Australian Fire Service Medal ribbon

ACT Rural Fire Service

- Anthony Hill

NSW Rural Fire Service

- Michael John Amos
- Stephanye Ann Holden
- Heather Margaret Jones
- Victor Charles Judson
- Peter James Lugsdin
- Andrew Duncan Macdonald
- Linda Mary Riley
- Grant Stanley Wargren

ACT Fire and Rescue

- Glenn Cameron Brewer

Fire and Rescue New South Wales

- Graham Andrew Kingsland
- Gregory John Lewis
- Zena Mehanna
- Gregory Charles McIlwaine

Queensland Fire and Emergency Services

- Ashley Alfred Cupitt, OAM
- Graeme Robert Hall
- Waine Douglas Scott

South Australian Country Fire Service

- Gregory John Crawford
- Lynda May Smith

Country Fire Authority of Victoria

- Paul Richard Denham
- Dawn Hartog

Fire and Rescue Service of Western Australia

- Roberto Paul Alteri

Western Australia Department of Fire & Emergency Services

- Michael Robert Gillham

=== Ambulance Service Medal (ASM) ===
Ambulance Service Medal ribbon

Ambulance Service Victoria

- Joanne Kate Wilton

Australian Capital Territory Ambulance Service

- Michelle Maree Blewitt, BM

New South Wales Ambulance Services

- Roderick Joseph Bryant-King
- Geoffrey Raymond Coleman
- Dr Sarah Coombes
- Allen Knowles
- Karl Joseph Spackman
- Hayley Renee Turner

Queensland Ambulance Service

- Assistant Commissioner Matthew Raymond Green
- Assistant Commissioner David Gregory Hartley

SA Ambulance Service

- Thamsin Kate Dunn
- Stacey Solomou

St John (NT) Inc

- Mark Daniel Ferguson
- Warren Mark Purse

St John Ambulance Services Western Australia

- Andrew Charles Blane
- Rebecca Anne Boughton
- Steven William Douglas
- Conrad Geoffrey Fairhead
- Mark Noel Hill
- Michael Thomas Morgan
- Mark Christopher McDonald
- Naomi May Powell
- Brett James Screen
- Jillian Melville Smith
- Amy Leigh Teakle
- David Andrew Tunnard

Tasmanian Ambulance Service

- Colin Peter George
- Lucy Beth Oatley

=== Emergency Services Medal (ESM) ===
Emergency Services Medal ribbon

New South Wales

- Tresne Lorraine Chesher
- Raymond John Jones
- Ian Phillip Morrow
- David Phillip Parsons
- Gerald Howell Stephenson
- Jacquelyn Mary Taffs
- Robert Alan Wilson

Victoria

- Royston William Kennedy
- Edward Robert Lindner

Queensland

- Raymond Charles Mogg
- Darryl James Prizeman

Western Australia

- Stephen Andrew Summerton

South Australia

- Julie Louise Page

Australian Capital Territory

- Marlana Elizabeth Butters
- Jason Jones

=== Australian Corrections Medal (ACM) ===
Australian Corrections Medal ribbon

New South Wales

- Fortini Daddario
- Annie Florence Grenfell
- Storm Masters
- Shaun Anthony McClafferty
- Gregory John Rushton
- Peter James Sharp
- Preetpal Singh
- Wayne Robert Slater
- Kelly-Anne Stewart
- David Ian Ward

Victoria

- Anthony Enzo Calandro
- Gabrielle Simmons

Queensland

- Vanessa Maree Aland
- Cornelius Smith
- Kristine Lynette Winter

Western Australia

- Jason Malcolm Barnett
- Kerri Ann Bishop
- Wendy Jane Duguid
- Christine Deborah Ginbey
- Sharon Debra Turner
- Acting Assistant Commissioner Alan David Watkins

South Australia

- Colin John Mercer

Australian Capital Territory

- Daniella Posavec

== Distinguished and Conspicuous Service ==
=== Distinguished Service Medal (DSM) ===
Distinguished Service Medal ribbon

Air Force

- Flight Lieutenant Michael Andrew Que Hee, CSC – For distinguished leadership in warlike operations as Commander Air Task Group 630 on Operations OKRA and HIGHROAD from November 2019 to September 2020.

=== Commendation for Distinguished Service ===
Commendation for Distinguished Service ribbon

Army

- Colonel Michael Jason Lowe – For distinguished performance of duties in warlike operations as the Director of Future Operations for Operation INHERENT RESOLVE, on Operation OKRA, from July 2021 to May 2022.

=== Bar to the Conspicuous Service Cross (CSC and Bar) ===
Conspicuous Service Cross and Bar ribbon

Army

- Colonel Amanda Alice Johnston, CSC For outstanding achievement as the Director Preparedness, Joint Collective Training, Resources and Gender Advisor – Army within Army Headquarters.
- Lieutenant Colonel Roger Leslie Pilton, CSC – For outstanding achievement in technical Joint Force communications integration within Australian Defence Force Headquarters.

=== Conspicuous Service Cross (CSC) ===
Conspicuous Service Cross ribbon

Navy

- Captain Virginia Hayward, RAN – For outstanding devotion to duty as Director Navy Workforce Strategy and Futures.
- Captain Ben Hissink, RAN – For outstanding achievement as the Commanding Officer of HMAS Supply.
- Commander Russell Martin Skor, RAN – For outstanding achievement as the Officer in Charge of the Royal Australian Navy Medical School.

Army

- Lieutenant Colonel Shamus Michael Armstrong – For outstanding achievement as Commanding Officer of 20th Regiment, Royal Australian Artillery.
- Captain Lachlan William Attard – For outstanding achievement in the performance of duty as the Project Engineer and Site Lead for the Cook and Tiroas Barracks infrastructure project in Vanuatu from August 2021 to May 2022.
- Lieutenant Colonel David Winton Cave – For outstanding devotion to duty in training, command and academic leadership as the Commanding Officer of the Australian Defence Force Academy.
- Lieutenant Colonel Andrew James Deacon, CSM – For outstanding achievement as the Commanding Officer and Chief Instructor of the 1st Recruit Training Battalion, Royal Military College of Australia.
- Lieutenant Colonel Andrew William Hine – For outstanding achievement in resource management and training development for the Australian Defence Force.
- Lieutenant Colonel Amber Nicole Humphreys – For outstanding devotion to duty as the Staff Officer Grade One – Program Sustainment in Logistics Branch, Army Headquarters.
- Lieutenant Colonel J – For outstanding achievement as the Commanding Officer of the Special Operations Engineer Regiment and in support of the development of counter weapons of mass destruction capabilities for the Australian Defence Force.
- Colonel Sally Amanda McClellan – For outstanding achievement in the management of sensitive issues in the Special Operations Command, Australian Army.
- Warrant Officer Class Two O – For outstanding achievement in Special Operations capability development.
- Lieutenant Colonel Matthew Liam O'Donnell, DSM – For outstanding achievement as the Operations Officer at Headquarters 1st Division and Deployable Joint Force Headquarters during the period 2021 and 2022.
- Lieutenant Colonel Graham Cameron Price – For outstanding achievement in conducting cyber security and defensive cyber operations, and developing cyber domain capabilities and concepts for the Australian Defence Force.
- Lieutenant Colonel Gabrielle Louise Raffin – For outstanding achievement as the Commanding Officer of the Queensland University Regiment.
- Warrant Officer Class One Mark Anthony Regan – For outstanding achievement as the Network Operations Warrant Officer in Supply Chain Branch and the Supply Chain Manager in Joint Logistics Unit (North).
- Lieutenant Colonel Roland Leslie Spackman – For outstanding devotion to duty as Commanding Officer of the 7th Battalion, The Royal Australian Regiment.
- Lieutenant Colonel Wendy Jayne Wheadon – For outstanding achievement in the application of exceptional skills and judgement as the principal logistics advisor and Brigade Aviation Maintenance Officer within the 16th Aviation Brigade.
- Colonel Warwick Anthony Young, OAM – For outstanding achievement as Deputy Commander Joint Task Force 1110 and as Deputy Commander and Commander Joint Task Group 629.1 during the period from January 2020 to December 2021.

Air Force

- Group Captain Patrick Joseph Del Guidice – For outstanding devotion to duty in the development, acquisition and sustainment of space based communications for the Australian Defence Force.
- Squadron Leader Christopher Nathan Godfrey – For outstanding achievement in development of Air-To-Air Refuelling Capability for the P-8A Poseidon Maritime Patrol and Response Aircraft for the Australian Defence Force and close allies.
- Sergeant Georgia Adelaide Hannah – For outstanding achievement in establishing the government communications capability for the KC-30A Multi-Role Tanker Transport Aircraft for the Royal Australian Air Force.
- Group Captain Ashley James Howell – For outstanding achievement in leading and managing the acquisition of Integrated Air and Missile Defence capabilities for the Australian Defence Force.
- Group Captain Angeline Margaret Lewis – For outstanding achievement in the provision of legal services to the Australian Defence Force.
- Wing Commander Justin Douglas Ryder – For outstanding achievement in the development of the Air Mobility Group Safety Management Program for the Royal Australian Air Force.
- Squadron Leader Kylie Ann Thompson – For outstanding achievement in facilities management and sustainment for the Royal Australian Air Force.
- Warrant Officer David Anthony Turnbull – For outstanding achievement in advancement of the reformed Air and Space Power Centre, and in the delivery of leadership initiatives to the Royal Australian Air Force's enlisted workforce.

=== Conspicuous Service Medal (CSM) ===
Conspicuous Service Medal ribbon

Navy

- Lieutenant Commander Vikas Dalal, RAN – For meritorious achievement in the development of the Canberra Class Landing Helicopter Dock satellite communication capability for the Royal Australian Navy.
- Commander Mile Madarac, RAN – For meritorious achievement as the Amphibious and Afloat Support Group, Capability Support Manager.
- Lieutenant Fiona Vi Nguyen, RAN – For meritorious achievement in the field of aviation capability development.
- Commander Gary Joseph Page, RAN – For devotion to duty in training and education delivery for the Australian Defence Force.
- Petty Officer Nathan James Spilling – For meritorious achievement in the field of Navy technical support and training.
- Chief Petty Officer Ryan James Thiele – For meritorious achievement in the field of Submarine Marine Technician Training.
- Lieutenant Commander Laura Jayne Vines, RAN – For meritorious achievement in planning the 2019 and 2022 Indo-Pacific Seapower Conferences.
- Leading Seaman Jahlaya Weazel – For meritorious achievement in cultural leadership and the promotion of diversity and inclusion in HMAS Supply.

Army

- Corporal A – For devotion to duty as a linguist who has significantly contributed to the relationship between Australian Special Operations Command and Indonesian Special Forces.
- Corporal B – For meritorious achievement as the Commander for the Special Operations Planning Team in support of Operation BANNISTER in 2022.
- Lieutenant Colonel Scott Jason Fletcher – For devotion to duty as the Chief of Staff within Headquarters Joint Task Group 629.1 during Operation COVID 19 ASSIST and Operation NSW FLOOD ASSIST 21 from January to November 2021.
- Lieutenant Colonel Neil Jeffery Glasson – For meritorious achievement as the Regimental Medical Officer at the Special Air Service Regiment.
- Warrant Officer Class One Matthew James McMillan – For meritorious achievement as the J1 within Headquarters Joint Task Group 629.1 during Operation BUSHFIRE ASSIST 2020, COVID 19 ASSIST, NSW FLOOD ASSIST 21 and FLOOD ASSIST 22 from 20 January 2020 to 17 April 2022.
- Sergeant Lachlan Thomas Robinson – For meritorious achievement in the development of a foundation warfighting and leadership Aide-Memoire for Land Forces.
- Warrant Officer Class Two Cheryl Joy Sinclair – For meritorious achievement as the Military Employment Classification Review Board Governance Warrant Officer in Career Management – Army.
- Warrant Officer Class Two T – For meritorious achievement as the Company Sergeant Major of the Innovation and Experimentation Group in the 2nd Commando Regiment.

Air Force

- Flight Lieutenant Jorgia Kate Broadbent – For meritorious achievement as the Logistics Officer, Task Unit 630.1, Air Task Group, on Operation ACCORDION from May 2021 to December 2021.
- Sergeant Thomas William Chuter – For meritorious achievement in advancing targeting expertise in Number 460 Squadron for the Royal Australian Air Force.
- Flight Lieutenant Brenton Garry Goodin – For meritorious achievement as Headquarters Middle East Operations Officer and Host Nation Liaison Officer on Operation ACCORDION from September 2021 to March 2022.
- Warrant Officer Alan Grant Johnston – For meritorious achievement as the Officer in Command of Maintenance, Task Element 630.1.6, Air Task Group, on Operation ACCORDION from May 2021 to September 2021.
- Corporal Timothy John Nevin – For meritorious achievement in deployable Link 16 development and enhancement of Tactical Data Link capability for the Australian Defence Force.
- Group Captain Catherine Mary Wallis – For devotion to duty in managing inquiries and investigations in the Office of the Inspector-General of the Australian Defence Force.
