= Risley =

Risley may refer to:

== Education ==
- Colored Memorial School and Risley High School, Brunswick, Georgia, U.S.
- John Risley Hall, Dalhousie University, Halifax, Nova Scotia, Canada
- Risley Residential College, Cornell University, Ithaca, New York, U.S.

== People ==
=== Surname ===
- Ann Risley (born 1949), American actress and comedian
- Bill Risley (born 1967), former MLB pitcher
- Elijah Risley (1787–1870), American politician
- Herbert Hope Risley (1851–1911), British ethnographer and colonial administrator
- John Risley (born 1948), Canadian businessman
- Michealene Risley, American writer, director and human rights activist
- Thomas Risley (1630–1716), English clergyman
- Todd Risley (1937–2007), American psychologist
- Walt Risley (died 1971), American football, basketball and baseball coach
- Richard Risley (before 1615–1648), Puritan settler

== Places ==
- Risley, Derbyshire, England
- Risley, Warrington, Cheshire, England
  - HM Prison Risley, a prison in the district
- Risley Township, Marion County, Kansas, United States

== Other uses ==
- Risley (circus act), a form of acrobalance
- Risley Hall, Derbyshire, a hotel and spa
- Risley Moss, an area of peat bog in England
- ROF Risley, a former munitions factory near Warrington, England
- Samuel Risley-class icebreaker, a class of Canadian icebreakers

== See also ==
- Riseley (disambiguation)
- Risleya, an orchid
