= Michael Horowitz =

Michael Horowitz may refer to:

- Michael C. Horowitz (born 1978), American international relations scholar
- Michael D. Horowitz (born 1938), American author and archivist
- Michael E. Horowitz (born 1962), Inspector General at the U.S. Department of Justice
- Michael J. Horowitz (born 1964), American electrical engineer
- Michael Horowitz (endocrinologist), Australian medical researcher and professor of medicine
- Michael Horowitz (journalist) (1950–2024), Austrian journalist, editor and photographer

== See also ==
- Mikhail Horowitz (born 1950), American poet and satirist
- Michael Horovitz (1935–2021), British poet
