= Risley Hall =

Risley Hall can mean:

- Risley Residential College at Cornell University in Ithaca, New York, USA
- Risley Hall, Derbyshire, now a hotel
- John Risley Hall at Dalhousie University, Halifax, Nova Scotia, Canada
