= Geoff Phillips =

Australian television news presenter

Geoffrey Gordon Phillips is a retired Australian television news presenter. He was best known for presenting the New South Wales and Australian Capital Territory editions of WIN News on WIN Television, from the network's headquarters in Wollongong.

In 2017, Phillips celebrated 29 years with WIN Television with WIN Corporation. A year later, he celebrated his 30th anniversary of working for WIN Television.

In 2016, ABC Television's Media Watch program showed Phillips in an on-screen graphic to illustrate the lack of on-screen diversity on Australia's news bulletins, with the program showing Phillips as being one of four white Australian news presenters who read news for Canberra.

In 2009, Phillips was diagnosed with prostate cancer and in 2017, he became the patron of the Cancer Council's Relay for Life event in Wollongong. He also has coeliac disease.

In 2019 Phillips announced his retirement from WIN News after 31 years.

In the 2023 King's Birthday Honours, Phillips was awarded the Medal of the Order of Australia for "service to the broadcast media, and to the community".

== See also ==
- Amy Duggan
