= Glenda Halliday =

Australian neuroscientist

Glenda Halliday AC FAA FAHMS
- Occupation: Neuroscientist
- Awards: NSW Scientist of the Year (2022)

Academic background
- Education: University of New South Wales
- Thesis: The organization of the ventromedial mesencephalic tegmentum (1986)

Glenda Margaret Halliday is an Australian neuroscientist. As of 2021, she is a professor at the University of Sydney and research fellow in the National Health and Medical Research Council (NHMRC). She was named 2022 NSW Scientist of the Year.

== Education ==
Halilday graduated with a BSc from the University of New South Wales (UNSW) in 1981. She went on to graduate with a PhD from the Faculty of Medicine at the UNSW in 1986, with a thesis titled "The organization of the ventromedial mesencephalic tegmentum". While undertaking her PhD she founded a donor program to enable study of Parkinson's disease in the brain.

== Career ==
Halliday is a research fellow of the NHMRC, first appointed to that role in 1990. Working at UNSW, she was appointed professor of medicine in 2003 and subsequently professor of neuroscience in 2008. As of 2021 she is a professor and NHMRC leadership fellow based at the University of Sydney.

Halliday's research focuses on neurodegeneration, including Parkinson's disease and frontotemporal dementia. Her work has led to improved treatment of Parkinson's sufferers.

== Honours and recognition ==
Halliday was elected a Fellow of the Australian Academy of Health and Medical Sciences in 2015 and Fellow of the Australian Academy of Science in May 2021. She was awarded the 2020 NHMRC Elizabeth Blackburn Investigator Grant Award for Leadership in Clinical Medicine and Science and in 2021 won the international Robert A. Pritzker Prize for Leadership in Parkinson's Research. She was named NSW Scientist of the Year at the 2022 NSW Premier's Prizes for Science and Engineering recognising her research on neurodegenerative diseases.

Halliday was appointed as a Companion of the Order of Australia in the 2023 King's Birthday Honours for "eminent service to medical research in the field of neurodegenerative disorders, including the development of revised diagnostic criteria for Parkinson's disease, and as a mentor".
