= Fiona Balfour =

Australian business executive

Fiona Balfour AM
- Born: 14 August 1958 (age 68); Melbourne, Australia
- Education: Monash University, University of New South Wales, RMIT University
- Known for: Chief Information Officer at Telstra
- Awards: Pearcey Award

Fiona Elizabeth Balfour AM (born 14 August 1958) is an Australian business executive in the field of information technology. She has been named Chief Information Officer of the Year in Australia four times: 2003, 2004, 2005, and 2006. In 2006 she was awarded the Pearcey Award for distinguished lifetime achievement and contribution to the development and growth of Australian IT professions, research and industry. In 2017 she was appointed to the board of the Western Sydney Airport Corporation by Urban Infrastructure Minister Paul Fletcher. In May 2021 she was appointed to the board of the Australian Broadcasting Corporation by communications minister Paul Fletcher against the recommendations of an independent panel.

== Life ==
Balfour was born in Melbourne, Australia, and completed a Bachelor of arts degree in English and history at Monash University in 1979. She initially worked in the public sector, in the Victorian State Public Service, followed by the Commonwealth Government, in roles related to project management and project leadership. From 1985 to 1991 she worked in management consulting and continued her studies with a Graduate Diploma in Information Management from the University of New South Wales and an MBA from RMIT University.

In 1992, Balfour joined Qantas and held a variety of positions before being appointed Chief Information Officer and a member of the Qantas Executive Committee in 2001. In 2003, her roles were expanded to include IT, procurement, property, financial services, and human resources services.

In 2006, she was appointed Chief Information Officer at Telstra, a position she held for ten months. Balfour went on to hold a number of non-executive director positions and to teach at the University of New South Wales Business School. Balfour joined ABC board in 2021.

Balfour was appointed as a Member of the Order of Australia in the 2023 King's Birthday Honours for "significant service to corporate governance, and to the aviation sector".
