= Riseley =

Riseley may refer to:

== People ==
- Frank Riseley (1877–1959), British tennis player
- Jillian Riseley, Australian businesswoman
- Martin Riseley (born 1969), Canadian violinist and concertmaster

== Places ==
- Riseley, Bedfordshire, a village in Bedfordshire, England
- Riseley, Berkshire, a village in Berkshire, England
