= Jane Hall (Australian health economist) =

Health economist and researcher

Jane Patricia Hall AO is an Australian academic, professor of Health Economics in the Business School and Faculty of Health, University of Technology Sydney, NSW Australia. Hall is a Fellow of the Academy of Social Sciences in Australia, and a Fellow of the Australian Academy of Health and Medical Sciences.

== Education and career ==
Hall graduated with a PhD from the University of Sydney in 1994.

She is currently a "Distinguished Professor" of Health Economics in the UTS Centre for Health Economics Research and Evaluation, a Fellow of the Academy of Social Sciences in Australia, and a Fellow of the Australian Academy of Health and Medical Sciences.

From 2019 to 2021 Hall was the president of the Academy of Social Sciences in Australia.

== Health economics research ==
Hall was the founding director of the Centre for Health Economics Research and Evaluation, which was established in 1990. She instigated the Health Services Research Association of Australia and New Zealand (HSRAANZ) in 2001.

Hall's research areas of focus include health technology assessment, measurement of quality of life, end of life care, health workforce issues, and the economics of primary care. Her current work is focused on the financing and funding of health care to improve system performance.

== Awards and recognition ==
Hall was appointed an Officer of the Order of Australia in the 2023 Kings Birthday Honours, "for distinguished service to the social sciences, to academic leadership and mentoring, and to national and international associations." Select awards include the following:

- 2023 - Officer of the Order of Australia.
- 2017 - National Health and Medical Research Council Outstanding Contribution Award.
- 2016 - elected Fellow of the AAHMS.
- 2016 - recognised in The Australian Financial Review & Westpac 100 Women of Influence Awards.
