= Rebecca Ivers =

Australian public health researcher

Professor Rebecca Ivers AM FRSN FAHMS

Personal details
- Born: Rebecca Q. Ivers
- Occupation: Medical researcher

Rebecca Q. Ivers is an Australian academic known for her work in injury prevention and trauma care research.

== Career and research ==
Ivers is Scientia Professor, and Head of the School of Population Health at the University of New South Wales, an honorary Professorial Fellow at the George Institute for Global Health and previously National Health and Medical Research Council Senior Research Fellow. She was awarded the 2018 Elizabeth Blackburn Fellowship and named on the Australian Financial Review and Westpac 100 Women of Influence Awards in 2014.

She is an injury epidemiologist and a public health researcher. She has been credited with influencing Australian government legislation relating to graduated driver licensing.

She has also been involved in a number of studies working with Aboriginal and Torres Strait Islander communities, including analysis of driving behaviour and crashes and preventing avoidable injuries among children. Recent work on burn injury has highlighted the need for systems change regarding delivery of care.

Ivers has written editorials for the Sydney Morning Herald on topics including alcohol advertising and sports, gun laws, bicycle safety and helmets, and road safety in general. She has also written several editorials for Croakey on various public health topics. She has also commented on the equalizing effect of COVID-19 on academic research.

Ivers has overseen studies with a global reach examining the burden and risk factors for injury in low-income settings, including Vietnam, India and China. Current global projects involve a large scale initiative implementing community drowning interventions in Bangladesh, and work on scalable interventions for drowning in India and Vietnam. She also leads work on fracture care working with investigators from McMasters University on a NHMRC funded prospective study of 40,000 people examining the incidence and predictors of mortality in people sustaining traumatic fractures in low income country settings. She coauthored the WHO Step Safety Report which highlighted rates of life impacting falls and new prevention strategies.

== Selected publications ==
- Liu, B.C.; Ivers, R.; Norton, R.; Boufous, S.; Blows, S.; Lo, S.K. (2008). Cochrane Injuries Group (ed.). "Helmets for preventing injury in motorcycle riders". Cochrane Database of Systematic Reviews. 4 (1) CD004333. doi:10.1002/14651858.CD004333.pub3. hdl:10536/DRO/DU:30009360. PMID 18254047.
- Cumming, R.G.; Ivers, R.; Clemson, L.; Cullen, J.; Hayes, M. F.; Tanzer, M.; Mitchell, P. (2007). "Improving Vision to Prevent Falls in Frail Older People: A Randomized Trial: VISION IMPROVEMENT FOR FALLS PREVENTION". Journal of the American Geriatrics Society. 55 (2): 175–181. doi:10.1111/j.1532-5415.2007.01046.x. PMID 17302652. S2CID 24638499.
- Ivers, R.; Senserrick, T.; Boufous, S.; Stevenson, M.; Chen, H.-Y.; Woodward, M.; Norton, R. (2009). "Novice Drivers' Risky Driving Behavior, Risk Perception, and Crash Risk: Findings From the DRIVE Study". American Journal of Public Health. 99 (9): 1638–1644. doi:10.2105/AJPH.2008.150367. ISSN 0090-0036. PMC 2724457. PMID 19608953.
- Blows, S.; Ameratunga, S.; Ivers, R.Q.; Lo, S.K.; Norton, R. (2005). "Risky driving habits and motor vehicle driver injury". Accident Analysis & Prevention. 37 (4): 619–624. doi:10.1016/j.aap.2005.03.003. PMID 15949452.
- Blows, S.; Ivers, R.Q.; Connor, J.; Ameratunga, S.; Woodward, M.; Norton, R. (2005). "Marijuana use and car crash injury". Addiction. 100 (5): 605–611. doi:10.1111/j.1360-0443.2005.01100.x. ISSN 0965-2140. PMID 15847617.

== Awards and honours ==
- Fellow of the Australian Academy of Health and Medical Sciences, 2023.
- Appointed as a Member of the Order of Australia in the 2023 King's Birthday Honours for "significant service to community health through injury prevention research and education".
- Fellow of the Royal Society of New South Wales, 2021
- National Health and Medical Research Council Elizabeth Blackburn Fellowship (Public Health) 2018
- Winner, Innovation: Australian Financial Review and Westpac100 Women of Influence Awards 2014
- NSW Public Health Associations' Public Health Impact Award. July 2014
- Australian Injury Prevention Network (AIPN): 2013 AIPN Award for Sustained Achievement. November 2013
- Young Tall Poppy Award for Science. October 2008
- National Health and Medical Research Council Achievement Award. December 2007
