= Caroline Bower =

Australian medical researcher and professor of medicine

Caroline Bower AC
- Education: MBBS, University of Western Australia; MSc, DLSHTM in epidemiology, University of London; PhD, University of Western Australia
- Known for: Register of birth defects; FASD in juvenile detention
- Medical career
- Profession: Emeritus Professor of Medicine
- Field: Epidemiology
- Institutions: Telethon Kids Institute; University of Western Australia; National Health and Medical Research Council; Department of Health (Western Australia)

Caroline Isabel Bower AC is an Australian medical researcher, professor of medicine, and public health advocate. Now retired, she is an emeritus professor at the University of Western Australia.

Bower's area of research is epidemiology, especially as it relates to the health of babies. She founded Australia's first registry of birth defects, and led the campaign to reduce neural tube defects in babies by adding folic acid to flour. Subsequently, she conducted research on Fetal Alcohol Spectrum Disorder and how it should be handled in the juvenile justice system.

In 2023 she was awarded Australia's highest civilian honour, Companion of the Order of Australia, for her service to medical research and education.

== Education ==
Bower initially intended to practice obstetrics, but the desire to spend more time with her young family prompted her to opt for a research-oriented field instead. She graduated with a medical degree (MBBS) from the University of Western Australia (UWA). She later qualified with a Master of Science (MSc) from the London School of Hygiene and Tropical Medicine, and a PhD from UWA.

== Medical career ==
=== Birth defects register ===
Bower started work in 1980 as a Research Epidemiologist at the University of Western Australia (UWA). Her initial project was to set up Australia's first birth defects registry (the Western Australia Register of Developmental Anomalies) for the Department of Health, Western Australia. Bower served as its head from 1980 to 2016. The creation of the register was motivated largely by concerns about after-effects from the Vietnam War: she told Cosmos magazine: "In Australia there wasn't a collection of information on birth defects, but there was concern about Australian – and other – veterans from Vietnam that had been or might have been exposed to Agent Orange, and whether that exposure caused birth defects in their offspring." All other Australian states have since replicated that register, providing crucial data for innumerable research projects.

Instead of confirming the concerns about Agent Orange, Bower and her colleague Professor Fiona Stanley uncovered another, more significant, issue - the need for adequate folate in circumventing neural tube defects. This discovery ultimately led to the incorporation of folate into wheat flour from 2009, which significantly reduced the occurrence of these problems.

=== Fetal Alcohol Spectrum Disorder ===
Bower has since investigated numerous other aspects of children's health, with the most challenging being preventing, diagnosing, and managing Fetal Alcohol Spectrum Disorder (FASD). "FASD is far more complex than folate and neural tube defects... We became aware of FASD back in 1973, so progress has been slow," she told Cosmos. Having identified this as a major problem, she led the lobbying that resulted in adding warning messages targeted at pregnant women on packaged alcohol.

She held numerous significant roles throughout her career at the Centre of Research Excellence at FASD Research Australia and the Telethon Kids Institute, which is an Australian medical research institute associated with the University of Western Australia and the Perth Children's Hospital, focused on the prevention of paediatric disease. She jointly ran the world's first nation-wide study of FASD rates, finding significantly elevated rates among Aboriginal children and prompting the development of community initiatives and collaboratively formulating protocols for diagnosis.

Her FASD research reached a substantial milestone in 2018, with the publication in the British Medical Journal of her report which examined inmates at the Banksia Hill Juvenile Detention Centre, supported by the WA Department of Justice and the Department of Communities. That centre had been the subject of allegations of abuse, scrutiny by the media, and criticism by Amnesty International. Multi-disciplinary assessments were conducted on 113 10-17 year olds during 2015 and 2016. The analysis found that 89% had at least one type of severe neurological impairment and 36% had FASD, which is a higher prevalence than has been identified in any similar institution world-wide. In addition, many of the inmates had multiple problems: 65% of them had at least three distinct issues, and 23% had at least five. These problems caused difficulties in many executive functions including memory, attention, social interactions, the ability to relate cause to effect, planning, and motor skills. "Almost half the young people had severe problems with language, how to listen and understand and how to reply and explain what they think", Bower told the ABC News.

This study represented the first extensive examination of FASD within the Australian justice system. FASD is regarded as the "invisible disability" due to its wide range of symptoms, and it is often disregarded or falsely attributed to poor parenting. The study resulted in updated guidelines for engaging with children by the Western Australia Department of Justice.

The Banksia Hill study went on to play a key role in the 2023 Royal Commission into Violence, Abuse, Neglect and Exploitation of People with Disability, which devoted a chapter of their final report to this centre. The report stated that "Impairment in domains such as language, executive function, memory and cognition, may contribute to offending behaviours and/or difficulties in negotiating all aspects of the justice system." However, acceptance of these findings among non-medical people is not universal, and the W.A. premier Mark McGowan claimed "That's more excuse making," a comment that drew condemnation from medical and legal experts.

=== Other research ===
On other topics, Bower has also conducted studies that looked into the results of assisted reproductive technologies, the use of medications during pregnancy, the correlation between birth defects and intellectual disability and cerebral palsy, and identifying risks and consequences related to birth defects such as trachea-esophageal fistula, orofacial clefts, and congenital heart defects.

Along the way, she became Senior Principal Research Fellow at the UWA Medical School Centre for Child Health Research, and Principal Research Fellow at the National Health and Medical Research Council (NHMRC). At the Telethon Kids Institute, she held the position of Senior Principal Research Fellow in Alcohol and Pregnancy and Fetal Alcohol Spectrum Disorder Research (2004–2021). As of March 2024, her key research activities include studying the effects of FASD within the juvenile justice system, and establishing a Centre of Research Excellence for Reducing the Effects of Antenatal Alcohol on Child Health - REAACH.

She retired in 2021, and moved to Sydney, although she is still actively linked to both TKI and UWS. To recognize her extensive service, the UWA appointed her an Emeritus Professor.

=== Professional service ===
She also served numerous roles on professional and industry bodies, including:

- Secretary, vice-chair (2004–2007) and chair (2007–2009) of the International Clearinghouse for Birth Defects Surveillance and Research.
- Advisory Group of the FASD Hub Australia, since 2017.
- Co-director, FASD Research Australia Centre of Research Excellence (2016–2021).
- Member, Centres of Research Excellence (CRE) Grant Review Working Committee (2016, 2017).
- Chair of the Grants Committee, J.M O'Hara Research Fund, Pharmaceutical Society of Western Australia.
- Ambassador, National Organisation for FASD (NOFASD) Australia.
- Former Chair, Australian Paediatric Surveillance Unit.

== Awards and recognition ==
In the 2023 King's Birthday Honours, Bower was awarded Companion of the Order of Australia, "for eminent service to medical research as a paediatric epidemiologist, particularly in birth defects and early childhood development, to health and welfare through public health initiatives, and to medical education".

She is an honorary Emeritus Fellow of the Telethon Kids Institute. She was awarded the Distinguished Service Award by the International Clearinghouse for Birth Defects Surveillance Research in 2015, inducted into the Western Australian Science Hall of Fame in 2019, and won the Sue Miers Lifetime Achievement Award from the National Organisation for Fetal Alcohol Spectrum Disorders Australia (NOFASD Australia) in 2020.

The Public Health Association of Australia in 2018 declared that adding folate to flour was "one of the top 10 public health achievements of the past 20 years". In 2023, Research Australia awarded her the Peter Wills Medal.

She is a Fellow of the Australian Academy of Health and Medical Sciences (2017) and the Public Health Association of Australia (2008), and a Life Member of the Royal Australasian College of Physicians (2017) and the Australasian Epidemiological Association (2011).

== Publications ==
ResearchGate lists 386 of her scientific publications. As of 17 March 2024, Google Scholar lists 26,867 citations to her works, and an h-index of 81.
