= Misty Jenkins =

Australian scientist and cancer researcher

Misty Rayna Jenkins AO is an Australian scientist known for her research into lymphocytes and cancer treatment.

Jenkins leads an Immunology Laboratory at the Walter and Eliza Hall Institute of Medical Research where she researches brain cancer.

== Early life and education ==
Jenkins is a Gunditjmara woman and grew up near Ballarat, Victoria. She holds a Bachelor of Science with 1st Honours and a PhD in Microbiology and Immunology attained from the University of Melbourne.

== Research career ==
Following from her PhD, Jenkins was the first Indigenous Australian to attend the University of Cambridge as a postdoctoral research fellow, attending Cambridge after being awarded the NHRMC CJ Martin Fellowship. Returning to Melbourne to continue her research career, Jenkins became involved with the Aurora Project, a project which supports education opportunities for Indigenous Australians, working with the program to provide scholarships for other Indigenous students to attend Oxford or Cambridge. She was a founding member of the Women in Science Parkville Precinct (WISPP) committee aimed at advancing gender equity and diversity in science.

She has previously worked at the Peter MacCallum Cancer Centre in Melbourne, and currently works at the Walter and Eliza Hall Institute of Medical Research. She is an Honorary Senior Research Fellow, Department of Medical Biology at the University of Melbourne. Her research is focused on lymphocytes, a type of white blood cells which can protect against viruses and cancer. Specifically, Jenkins' research group uses using chimeric antigen receptor (CAR) T cell therapy, a new form of immune-targeted therapy that trains the body's T cells to fight against certain forms of cancer, including glioblastoma, an aggressive brain tumour of astrocytic origin.

Her research has been published in the Journal of Immunology, Journal of Experimental Medicine, and by the National Academy of Sciences.

== Awards ==
In 2009, Jenkins was awarded the NHMRC/RG Menzies Fellowship for T-cells research at the Cambridge Institute for Medical Research, UK and at the Peter MacCallum Cancer Centre in Melbourne.

Jenkins was awarded the L’Oreal for Women in Science Fellowship in 2013 and the Young Tall Poppy of the Year Award in 2015. She was named in the Westpac and Australian Financial Review 100 Women of Influence Awards in 2016, and awarded the STEM Professional Career Achievement Award at the CSIRO Indigenous STEM Awards in 2017.

In 2019, Jenkins was awarded an NHMRC Investigator Grant worth AUD $1.4 million to continue her research into the treatment of brain cancer. This area of research receives a small amount of funding from the total federal Australian government cancer research funding, and the current survival rate for people diagnosed with brain cancer is 20 percent.

In March 2020, Jenkins was inducted into the Victorian Honour Roll of Women in recognition of her advocacy for gender equity, Aboriginal health and education.

In May 2021, Jenkins was involved with developing a new approach to CAR T cell therapy which targets certain growth factor receptors in glioblastoma (an aggressive form of brain cancer) to eliminate brain tumors. Jenkins discovered a novel chimeric antigen receptor CAR T cell that eliminates human glioblastoma cells transplanted into the brains of mice. Jenkin reports that this new approach of immunotherapy tackles white blood cells to then recognise and destroy their own cancer. Jenkins is working with the head of neurosurgery at the Royal Melbourne Hospital, Professor Kate Drummond, in collaboration with a cross-disciplinary team of protein chemists, structural biologists and neurosurgeons, and were awarded an AUD $5 million Synergy Grant from the NHMRC to continue developing CAR T cell therapies for glioblastoma.

Jenkins was appointed an Officer of the Order of Australia in the 2023 King's Birthday Honours for "distinguished service to medical science as an immunologist, to the promotion of women in STEM, and to the Indigenous community".

== Selected publications ==
- Jenkins, M.R., Webby, R., Doherty, P.C. and Turner, S.J., 2006. Addition of a prominent epitope affects influenza A virus-specific CD8+ T cell immunodominance hierarchies when antigen is limiting. The Journal of Immunology, 177(5), pp.2917-2925.
- Jenkins, M.R., Rudd-Schmidt, J.A., Lopez, J.A., Ramsbottom, K.M., Mannering, S.I., Andrews, D.M., Voskoboinik, I. and Trapani, J.A., 2015. Failed CTL/NK cell killing and cytokine hypersecretion are directly linked through prolonged synapse time. Journal of Experimental Medicine, 212(3), pp.307-317.
- Davenport, A.J., Cross, R.S., Watson, K.A., Liao, Y., Shi, W., Prince, H.M., Beavis, P.A., Trapani, J.A., Kershaw, M.H., Ritchie, D.S. and Darcy, P.K., 2018. Chimeric antigen receptor T cells form nonclassical and potent immune synapses driving rapid cytotoxicity. Proceedings of the National Academy of Sciences, 115(9), pp.E2068-E2076.
- Abbott, R.C., Cross, R.S. and Jenkins, M.R., 2020. Finding the keys to the CAR: identifying novel target antigens for T cell redirection immunotherapies. International Journal of Molecular Sciences, 21(2), p.515.
- Jenkins, Marjorie R.; Sikon, Andrea L. (2008-05). "Update on nonhormonal approaches to menopausal management". Cleveland Clinic Journal of Medicine. 75 Suppl 4: S17–24. doi:10.3949/ccjm.75.suppl_4.s17. ISSN 0891-1150. PMID 18697262.
- Cattaneo, Anna Giulia; Gornati, Rosalba; Sabbioni, Enrico; Chiriva-Internati, Maurizio; Cobos, Everardo; Jenkins, Marjorie R.; Bernardini, Giovanni (2010-11). "Nanotechnology and human health: risks and benefits". Journal of applied toxicology: JAT. 30 (8): 730–744. doi:10.1002/jat.1609. ISSN 1099-1263. PMID 21117037.
- Jenkins, Misty R.; Griffiths, Gillian M. (2010-06). "The synapse and cytolytic machinery of cytotoxic T cells". Current Opinion in Immunology. 22 (3): 308–313. doi:10.1016/j.coi.2010.02.008. ISSN 1879-0372. PMC 4101800. PMID 20226643.
- Davenport, Alexander J.; Jenkins, Misty R. (2018-03). "Programming a serial killer: CAR T cells form non-classical immune synapses". Oncoscience. 5 (3–4): 69–70. doi:10.18632/oncoscience.406. ISSN 2331-4737. PMC 5978443. PMID 29854873.
