= Justine R. Smith =

Australian ophthalmic surgeon

Justine R. Smith AM is an Australian ophthalmic surgeon and vision researcher. Today she is based at Flinders University and Flinders Medical Centre in Adelaide, Australia. Smith was awarded Member of the Order of Australia "for significant service to ophthalmology, particularly research and education" in the 2023 King's Birthday Honours. She received the Flinders University Alumni Convocation Medal in 2022, the Gold Medal of the International Ocular Inflammation Society in 2023, and the Joanne Angle Service Award from the Association for Research in Vision and Ophthalmology in 2024.

== Career and achievements ==
- Gold Fellow of the Association for Research in Vision and Ophthalmology 2013
- President of the Association for Research in Vision and Ophthalmology Board of Trustees 2013-2014
- Elected Fellow of the Australian Academy of Health and Medical Sciences 2015
- Elected Chair of the Academia Ophthalmologica Internationalis 2015
- President of the American Uveitis Society 2015-2016
- Chair of the International Council of the International Ocular Inflammation Society 2015-2023
- Elected Fellow of the Academy of Asia-Pacific Professors of Ophthalmology 2017
- Superstar of STEM (Science and Technology Australia) 2017
- Executive Vice President of the Association for Research in Vision and Ophthalmology Board of Trustees 2017-2022
- Editor-in-Chief of Clinical and Experimental Ophthalmology 2020-2023: the first woman ever to lead a top-tier (Q1) ophthalmology journal
- Investigator Grant (Leadership Level 3) from the National Heath and Medical Research Council 2024-2028

== Selected publications ==
- Smith, Justine R.; Levinson, Ralph D.; Holland, Gary N. (2001). "Differential efficacy of tumor necrosis factor inhibition in the management of inflammatory eye disease and associated rheumatic disease". Arthritis Care and Research. 45: 252–257.
- Smith, Justine R.; Rosenbaum, James T.; Wilson, David J. (2002). "Role of intravitreal methotrexate in the management of primary central nervous system lymphoma with ocular involvement". Ophthalmology. 109 (9): P1709-1716. doi:10.1016/s0161-6420(02)01125-9.
- Smith, Justine R.; Braziel, Rita M.; Paoletti, Samantha (2003). "Expression of B-cell–attracting chemokine 1 (CXCL13) by malignant lymphocytes and vascular endothelium in primary central nervous system lymphoma". Blood. 101 (3): 815–821. doi:10.1182/blood-2002-05-1576.
- 2004 Susceptibility of retinal vascular endothelium to infection with Toxoplasma gondii tachyzoites.doi:10.1167/iovs.03-1105 Invest Ophthalmol Vis Sci
- 2005 A prospective trial of infliximab therapy for refractory uveitis: preliminary safety and efficacy outcomes. doi:10.1001/archopht.123.7.903 Arch Ophthalmol
- 2005 Report of an international workshop to standardize baseline evaluation and response criteria for primary CNS lymphoma. doi:10.1200/jco.2005.13.524 J Clin Oncol
- 2005 Standardization of uveitis nomenclature for reporting clinical data. Results of the First International Workshop. doi:10.1016/j.ajo.2005.03.057 Am J Ophthalmol
- 2007 Therapy insight: scleritis and its relationship to systemic autoimmune disease. doi:10.1038/ncprheum0454 Nat Clin Pract Rheumatol
- 2008 Sequence- and target-independent angiogenesis suppression by siRNA via TLR3. doi:10.1038/nature06765 Nature
- 2009 CCR3 is a target for age-related macular degeneration diagnosis and therapy. doi:10.1038/nature08151 Nature
- 2011 Primary vitreoretinal lymphoma: a report from an International Primary Central Nervous System Lymphoma Collaborative Group symposium. doi:10.1634/theoncologist.2011-0210 Oncologist
- 2012 Toxoplasma gondii tachyzoites cross retinal endothelium assisted by intercellular adhesion molecule-1 in vitro. doi:10.1038/icb.2012.21 Immunol Cell Biol
- 2012 Migration of Toxoplasma gondii-infected dendritic cells across human retinal vascular endothelium. doi:10.1167/iovs.12-10384 Invest Ophthalmol Vis Sci
- 2013 Role of the retinal vascular endothelial cell in ocular disease. doi:10.1016/j.preteyeres.2012.08.004 Prog Retin Eye Res
- 2013 Adalimumab therapy for refractory uveitis: results of a multicentre, open-label, prospective trial. doi:10.1136/bjophthalmol-2012-302292 Br J Ophthalmol
- 2014 Use of intravitreal rituximab for treatment of vitreoretinal lymphoma. doi:10.1136/bjophthalmol-2013-304043 Br J Ophthalmol
- 2015 Persistence of Ebola virus in ocular fluid during convalescence. doi:10.1056/nejmoa1500306 N Engl J Med
- 2017 Retinal pigment epithelial cells are a potential reservoir for Ebola virus in the human eye. doi:10.1167/tvst.6.4.12 Transl Vis Sci Technol
- 2018 Angiogenic and immunologic proteins identified by deep proteomic profiling of human retinal and choroidal vascular endothelial cells: potential targets for new biologic drugs. doi:10.1016/j.ajo.2018.03.020 Am J Ophthalmol
- 2018 Clinical manifestations and ophthalmic outcomes of ocular syphilis at a time of re-emergence of the systemic infection. doi:10.1038/s41598-018-30559-7 Sci Rep
- 2019 Revised criteria of International Workshop on Ocular Sarcoidosis (IWOS) for the diagnosis of ocular sarcoidosis. doi:10.1136/bjophthalmol-2018-313356 Br J Ophthalmol
- 2019 Current ophthalmology practice patterns for syphilitic uveitis. doi:10.1136/bjophthalmol-2018-313207 Br J Ophthalmol
- 2020 Managing uveitis during the COVID-19 pandemic. doi:10.1016/j.ophtha.2020.05.037 Ophthalmology
- 2020 T cell-intrinsic role for Nod2 in protection against Th17-mediated uveitis. doi:10.1038/s41467-020-18961-0 Nat Commun
- 2021 Clinical manifestations and visual outcomes associated with ocular toxoplasmosis in a Brazilian population. doi:10.1038/s41598-021-82830-z Sci Rep
- 2021 Pathogenesis of ocular toxoplasmosis. doi:10.1016/j.preteyeres.2020.100882 Prog Retin Eye Res
- 2022 Brief Research Report: Ebola virus differentially infects human iris and retinal pigment epithelial cells. doi:10.3389/fviro.2022.892394 Front Virol
- 2022 Prevalence of toxoplasmic retinochoroiditis in an Australian adult population: a community-based study. doi:10.1016/j.oret.2022.04.022 Ophthalmol Retina
- 2023 Selective transcription factor blockade reduces human retinal endothelial cell expression of intercellular adhesion molecule-1 and leukocyte binding. doi:10.3390/ijms24043304 Int J Mol Sci
- 2023 Current practice in the management of ocular toxoplasmosis. doi:10.1136/bjophthalmol-2022-321091 Br J Ophthalmol
- 2024 Presentation, diagnostic testing and initial treatment of vitreoretinal lymphoma. doi:10.1016/j.oret.2023.08.012 Ophthalmol Retina
- 2024 Ocular manifestations of COVID-19. doi:10.1016/j.preteyeres.2024.101285 Prog Retin Eye Res
- 2024 Treatment of noninfectious uveitic macular edema with periocular and intraocular corticosteroid therapies: a report by the American Academy of Ophthalmology. doi:10.1016/j.ophtha.2024.02.019 Ophthalmology
