= Michael Horowitz (endocrinologist) =

Australian medical researcher

Michael Horowitz AO
- Education: MBBS, University of Adelaide; PhD, University of Adelaide; DSc, University of Adelaide
- Known for: Role of digestive system in managing diabetes
- Medical career
- Profession: Professor of Medicine
- Institutions: University of Adelaide; Royal Adelaide Hospital

Michael Horowitz AO is an Australian medical researcher and professor of medicine.

He is the director of the Endocrine and Metabolic Unit at the Royal Adelaide Hospital and the director of the CRE for Translating Nutritional Science to Good Health at the University of Adelaide, where he has held a Personal Chair since 1995. His field of research is epidemiology, especially digestion factors that relate to the management of diabetes.

In 2023, he was made an Officer of the Order of Australia for his service to medical research and education.

== Education ==
He graduated with a Bachelor of Medicine and Bachelor of Surgery (MBBS) from the University of Adelaide in 1977, followed by a Doctorate of Philosophy (PhD) in 1984, and a Doctor of Science (DSc) in 2021.

== Medical career ==
In 1995, the University of Adelaide appointed him to a Personal Chair.

He has been the director of the Endocrine and Metabolic Unit at the Royal Adelaide Hospital since 1997, and he is the director of the National Health and Medical Research Council (NHMRC) Centre of Research Excellence (CRE) in Translating Nutritional Science to Good Health at the University of Adelaide. In 2023, the CRE awarded five research grants to fund investigations into methods to regulate excessively high or low blood glucose levels for people with diabetes. Specifically, most of them are looking into how to control the speed and extent of the rise in blood glucose following a meal.

His research activities primarily focus on how gastrointestinal functions affect blood sugar control, especially in relation to diabetes mellitus and appetite regulation. The impact of diabetes in Australia is large: 1.5 million people have the condition, and every year another 120,000 people are diagnosed with it. The number more than tripled from 2000 to 2023.

=== Professional service ===
He serves on the editorial board of the Medical Journal of Australia, and on the Grants Advisory Committee of the Royal Australasian College of Physicians Foundation. He also chaired the Research Advisory Committee of the Royal Australasian College of Physicians from 2009 to 2021, and he chairs the Royal Adelaide Hospital's Project Grants Committee.

== Awards and recognition ==
In the 2023 King's Birthday Honours, Horowitz was appointed an Officer of the Order of Australia "for distinguished service to endocrinology, particularly diabetes, as a researcher, educator and clinician".

In 2020-2024, he received an L3 Investigator Grant from the NHMRC for his project "Gastric emptying, glucagon-like peptide-1 and glycaemic control in diabetes and critical illness" in recognition of his outstanding contributions to the field.

Other recognition includes:

1995 - the University of Adelaide awarded him the Elder Prize for Scholarship
1999 - the Distinguished Research Prize of the Gastroenterological Society of Australia
2000 - the Eric Susman Prize was awarded by the Royal Australasian College of Physicians
2009 - the Kellion Award of the Australian Diabetes Society "for his outstanding contribution to diabetes research over a period of 27 years"
2010 - Masters Award for Sustained Achievement in Digestive Sciences from the American Gastroenterological Association
2014 - inaugural Fellow of the Australasian Academy of Health and Medical Sciences
2014 - 75th Anniversary Award from the Royal Australasian College of Physicians
2015 - he was elected a Fellow of the Australian Academy of Health and Medical Sciences
2022 - the European Association for the Study of Diabetes awarded him their Camillo Golgi Prize

== Publications ==
As of 30 January 2025, ResearchGate lists 1,055 of his scientific publications, and Google Scholar lists 66,348 citations to his works, and an h-index of 134. His most-cited work, which has been cited 3,340 times, is his 2010 paper "Diabetic neuropathies: update on definitions, diagnostic criteria, estimation of severity, and treatments".
