= Forbes McGain =

Australian anaesthetist and intensive care physician

Forbes McGain is an Australian anaesthetist, intensive care physician, and medical researcher specialising in healthcare sustainability. He is among the first recipients of Australia's National Health and Medical Research Council grant for sustainable healthcare in 2024.

== Early life and education ==
McGain studied medicine at University of Melbourne, graduating in 1996. He received his Fellowship of the Australian and New Zealand College of Anaesthetists in 2005.

== Career ==
McGain is an anaesthetist and intensive care physician at Western Health. He is a visiting associate professor at the Centre for Sustainable Medicine and is also an associate dean of Healthcare Sustainability at the University of Melbourne.

He has been a member of Doctors for the Environment Australia since 2011, and he completed his PhD in 2015 with his thesis ‘Environmental sustainability in hospitals: an exploration within anaesthetic and intensive care settings.

In 2019, he partnered with Vinyl Council Australia to develop the PVC Recovery in Hospitals with the program operating in more than 90 hospitals in Australia and New Zealand, reprocessing an average of 15 tons of PVC medical waste each month.

In 2020 during the Covid-19 pandemic, he co-developed medihood, a device that protects healthcare workers from infection by containing and filtering air from patient, for which he was awarded the ATSE Clunies Ross Knowledge Commercialisation award.

He was awarded the Medal of the Order of Australia in 2023.

In 2024, he became the first recipient of the Australia's NHMRC (National Health and Medical Research Council) grant for sustainable healthcare, and is currently leading five projects over two years aiming to improve hospitals systems by reducing waste and carbon emissions while enhancing patient care.

== Recognition and awards ==
- Along with Prof. Jason Monty, winner of 2022 Australian Academy of Technological Sciences and Engineering (ATSE) Clunies Ross Knowledge Commercialisation award for their development of the Medihood (PPE used in hospital settings)
- 2023 Medal of the Order of Australia for service to medicine
- 2024 Australian and New Zealand Intensive Care Society (ANZICS) President's Medal
- 2025 ANZCA Academic Enhancement grant
