= Louisa Degenhardt =

Australian drug and alcohol researcher

Louisa Degenhardt AO FAA FASSA FAHMS
- Employer: University of New South Wales
- Known for: Drug and alcohol research
- Title: Professor
- Website: https://www.unsw.edu.au/staff/louisa-degenhardt

Louisa Degenhardt is an Australian drug and alcohol researcher, and a scientia professor. She is also a senior principal research fellow with the National Health and Medical Research Council, part of the Centre for National Drug and Alcohol Research. She was elected as a fellow of the Australian Academy of Science in 2024. She received an Order of Australia in 2023.

== Education and career ==
Degenhardt received her PhD in 2001. The topic was examining the comorbidity of mental disorders and drug use in the Australia and the general population.

She researches of diverse epidemiological studies. These studies include clinical population surveys, analysis of large-scale community. She also works on data linkage studies, particularly on young people and/or members of the population who have either historical drug dependence or experience chronic pain.

Degenhardt has a number of honorary Professorial appointments. These include appointments at the University of Washington, as well as the University of Melbourne, in the school of Global Health and Population, and the Murdoch Children's Research Institute.

Degenhardt is a fellow of numerous academies, including Fellow of the Australian Academy of Health and Medical Sciences, (2017), Fellow of the Academy of the Social Sciences in Australia, (2016), and the Fellow of the Australian Academy of Science, (2024).

== Publications ==
Degenhardt has over 250,000 citations, an H index of 159, as at May 2024, according to Google Scholar. She has published more than 45 book chapters 530 peer-reviewed papers, three books, and over 10 papers published in The Lancet.

Select publications include:

- Colledge-Frisby S; Ottaviano S; Webb P; Grebely J; Wheeler A; Cunningham EB; ... Degenhardt L (2023) 'Global coverage of interventions to prevent and manage drug-related harms: a systematic review', The Lancet Global Health, 11, pages. e673 - e683, http://dx.doi.org/10.1016/S2214-109X(23)00058-X
- Degenhardt L; Webb P; Colledge-Frisby S; Ireland J; Wheeler A; Ottaviano S; Willing A; Kairouz A; Cunningham EB; et al. (2023) 'Epidemiology of injecting drug use, prevalence of injecting-related harm: a systematic review', The Lancet Global Health, 11, pages. e659 - e672, http://dx.doi.org/10.1016/S2214-109X(23)00057-8
- Jahagirdar D et al., (2023) 'Global, regional, and national sex-specific burden and control of the HIV epidemic, 1990–2019, for 204 countries and territories: the Global Burden of Diseases Study 2019', The Lancet HIV, 8, pages. e633 - e651, http://dx.doi.org/10.1016/S2352-3018(21)00152-1
- Wardle H; Degenhardt L; et al. (2021), 'The Lancet Public Health Commission on gambling', Lancet Public Health, 6, pages. e2 - e3, http://dx.doi.org/10.1016/S2468-2667(20)30289-9

== Media ==
Degenhardt has published in The Conversation, on topics including the global burden of health due to illicit drugs and mental health, and why these are rising. She has also published on Xanax, and other drugs used to treat anxiety and depression, and why the TGA may make these more difficult to receive.

== Awards ==
- 2006: NSW Tall Poppy Award, Australian Institute of Policy and Science
- 2010: Peter Baume Public Health Impact Award, Faculty of Medicine, UNSW
- 2016: Fellow of the Academy of the Social Sciences in Australia
- 2016: The Australian Professional Society on Alcohol and Other Drugs Senior Scientist Award
- 2017: Fellow of the Australian Academy of Health and Medical Sciences
- 2022: NHMRC Elizabeth Blackburn Investigator Grant Awards for Public Health (Leadership)
- 2022: Best Female Scientists in the world, Clarivate
- 2023: Queen's Birthday – Officer of the Order of Australia
- 2024: Fellow of the Australian Academy of Science
