= John Risley Hall =

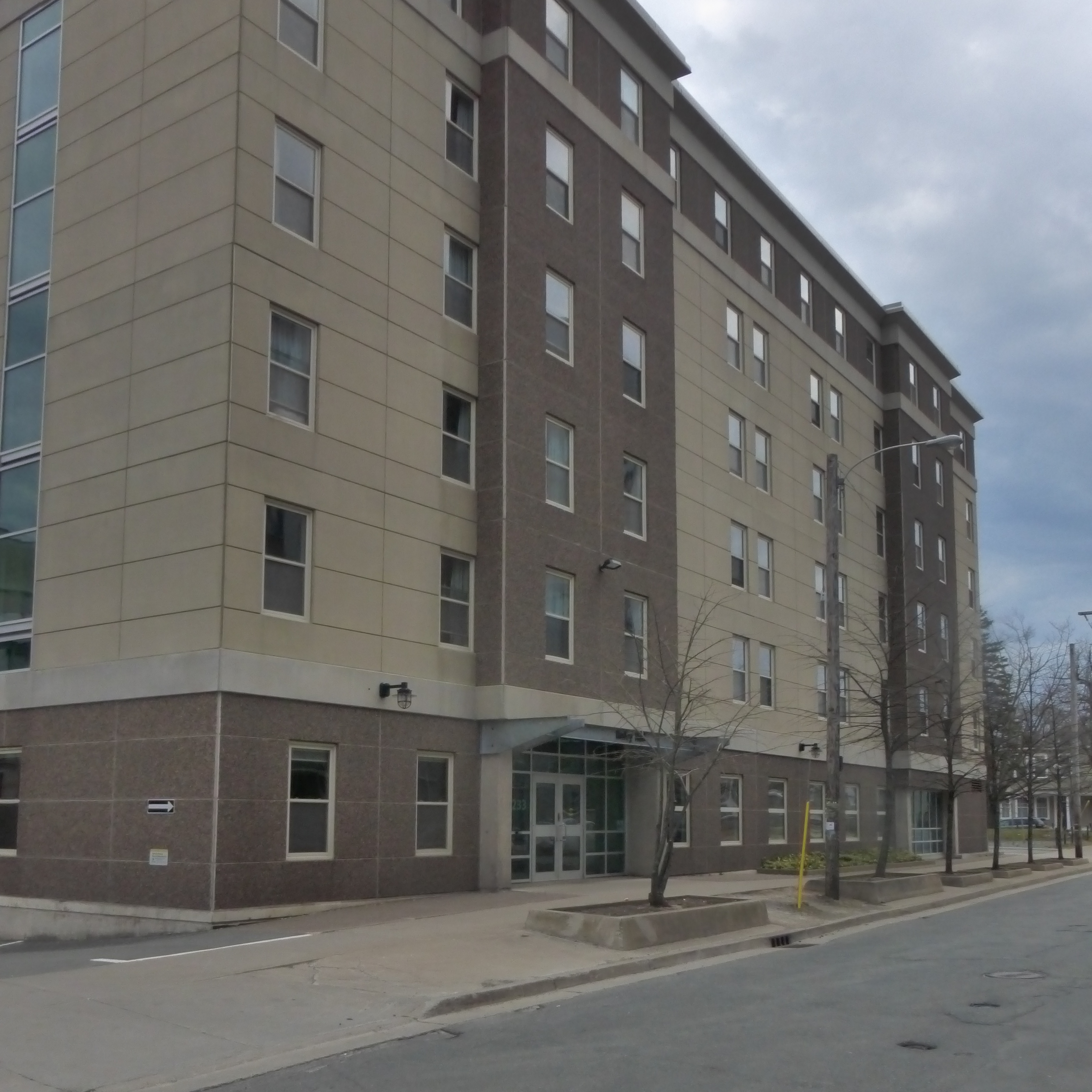
Risley Hall

John Risley Hall is a student residence building at Dalhousie University, Halifax, Nova Scotia. Opened in September 2004 after approximately one year of construction, it the newest of Dalhousie's traditional co-ed dormitory-style residences. It is located at 1233 LeMarchant Street at South Street.

== Building ==
Commonly referred to as simply Risley Hall, it provides accommodations for primarily first year undergraduates in 490 single rooms. The residence is named in recognition of the leadership and support of businessman John Risley at Dalhousie University the recent years. He served on the Dalhousie Board of Governors from 1992 to 2004 and chaired two major fundraising campaigns that made possible construction of the Marion McCain Arts and Sciences Building and the Kenneth C. Rowe Management Building.

=== Design ===
Risley Hall is known for its distinctive E plan. The E is divided into three wings, known as towers. The tower affiliation begins with 1st tower on the western side of the building. Between the wings are two separate courtyards. Due to the unforgiving weather during school months, these courtyards are seldom used.

=== Room setup ===
The majority of the rooms are similar, with the exception of a handful of larger rooms per floor. They include one large window, one height adjustable bed, a wardrobe, a desk, a storage drawer, and a sink. The rooms also feature individual heating controls. The room, and the front doors of the residence, are opened by the student's DalCard.

=== Amenities ===
Risley Hall tried to incorporate many desires of the students. Each floor is equipped with a kitchenette and a laundry room. The common rooms include a large television, couches and tables. Two elevators are at the core of the building. There is a midsized cafeteria underneath first tower. All the above-mentioned rooms have multiple outlets for Ethernet cables.

== Floor affiliations & Alumni ==
Each of the six storeys, with the exception of the first, has its own name. Due to the smaller size of the first floor, it shares ties with the second floor. These names however are not necessarily permanent. Floors and wings of other residences at Dalhousie have been named after people who contributed to the school.

Floor	Affiliation
1st	The Rock
2nd	The Rock
3rd	Phoenix
4th	The Bears
5th	The Jungle
6th	The Penthouse

== Trivia ==
- The rivalry between the 3rd floor (Phoenix) and 5th floor (Jungle) is well known.
- Risley Hall has an annual competition between floors known as "Prez Cup," which is a week-long series of events that residents participate in to earn points for their floor, similar to Harry Potter's "House Cup."

== See also ==
- Shirreff Hall
- Fenwick Place
