= Jillian Riseley =

Sustainability and the Circular Economy

- Employer: Deloitte
- Known for: Circular Economy
- Title: Ms
- Board member of: Launch Housing, Heathcote Health, Streetsmart Australia

Jillian Michelle Riseley AM works in the sustainability, climate and circular economy. She was appointed a Member of the Order of Australia for her "significant service to the not-for-profit sector, and sustainability". She has been an advocate for sustainability and responsible business.

== Career and education ==
Riseley was awarded a Masters degree in Sustainable Leadership from the University of Cambridge, in 2015, and a Bachelor of Arts from RMIT University in 1998. She is a graduate from the Australian Institute of Company Directors.

Riseley has worked on leading recycling initiatives and waste minimisation exercises. She had leadership roles in REA Group, Telstra and Sensis. She also worked at the Metropolitan Waste and Recovery Group, with the goal of improving waste recovery.

Riseley was on the board of the Royal Botanic Gardens, Victoria, from 2016–2020. Her role, as a member of the board, was to "conserve, protect, manage and improve the botanic gardens", as well as be involved in increasing public awareness of plants and plant communities within the Victorian Royal Botanic Gardens, as well as to provide for the "conservation of biodiversity and manage the use of the botanic gardens for education as well as public enjoyment." Riseley was also a judge of the Melbourne Awards, held by the City of Melbourne.

She said, upon joining Deloitte,

"For those of us who have worked in sustainability for some time, there's a palpable momentum and it's time to seize the opportunities to make our world, industries and communities more sustainable, fairer and prosperous (including the transition to a circular economy)."

She has spoken to the media and been a panel moderator or speaker on events discussing issues relating to the circular economy. Riseley has also written for The Age, on lessons in ethics, regarding corporate sustainability, particularly around the Volkswagen emissions test evading software.

== Publications ==
- Riseley J, (2016). Trust, Trump and warning signes for Australian Institutions. Pro Bono.
- Riseley J, (2016). CEOs on Notice for Lack of Sustainability Leadership. Pro Bono.
- Riseley J, (2016). The Changing Climate of Corporate Sustainability. Pro Bono.
- Riseley J, (2016). Top ten corporate sustainability Highlights of 2015. Pro Bono.

== Recognition & awards ==
2023 – Member of the Order of Australia
