= Farmer's Brother =

Honayawas or Farmer's Brother (c. 1730 – 1814) was a Seneca Chief, active member of the Six Nations, elected War Chief, translator, and noted orator who fought and negotiated with both the United States and British before, during, and after the American Revolution.

He was a signatory of the Treaty of Big Tree in 1797, and the Treaty of Buffalo Creek in 1802 which sold Little Beard's reservation to Oliver Phelps, Isaac Bronson, and Horatio Jones.

== Career ==
During the French and Indian War he may have fought in the disastrous Battle of the Monongahela with Braddock in 1755. During Pontiac's Rebellion he participated in the Devil's Hole Massacre in 1763.

When the Six Nations dissolved in 1777 over disagreements on allegiances during the American revolution Farmer's Brother sided with the British along other Senecas. After the war, however, he maintained friendly relations with the victorious colonials.

While previously very active as a war leader, Farmer's Brother became more heavily involved in the treaty making process with the Americans after the British signed the Treaty of Paris in 1783. In the treaty the British surrendered to the Americans several territories East of the Mississippi River, however they did this without the knowledge or consent of their Six Nations allies who still considered themselves the rightful owners of this land. The treaty did not include any mention of the Nations the British had made alliances with and left the responsibility of negotiating peace with them to the newly formed United States Government. This, coupled with previous instances of failed negotiations between the United States government and the Six Nations, pressured the Americans into action to avert more conflicts. The American statesman Timothy Pickering was appointed to position of commissioner for the Haudenosaunee by George Washington with the purpose of establishing a lasting peace between both nations. On October 14, 1794 Pickering met with the first group of representatives of the Six Nations at Buffalo Creek. A group of 500 Oneidas peoples arrived at the council grounds to voice their concerns and Farmer's Brother was among them. He acted as both the translator and orator for this group, delivering an opening address on behalf of the Chiefs where he articulated their grievances, requests, and demands. In the following days as more groups arrived, including delegations from the Seneca Nation led by Chiefs Red Jacket and Cornplanter, Farmer's Brother continued to take part in the negotiation process while Pickering heard the concerns of other Chiefs before they settled on an agreement. Ultimately Pickering, on behalf of the United States government, offered to restore some territory that had been taken from the Six Nations and promised a $4,500 annuity payment would be provided from United States to Six Nations in perpetuity to be spent on "clothing, domestic animals, implements of husbandry, and other utensils suited to their circumstances." After more deliberation when the Treaty was finally agreed upon on November 11, 1794 Farmer's Brother was one of the 50 Chiefs to sign. The treaty did more than settle the tensions between the two Nations it also made the American government recognize the sovereignty and jurisdiction of the Haudenosaunee as equally valid as their own.

In 1792 he was one of a group of chiefs who visited Philadelphia, possibly to be present at the signing of the Agreement with the Five Nations. While in Philadelphia he was presented with a silver medallion by George Washington. from then on he wore it constantly around his neck, and was often heard to say that he would lose it only when he lost his life. In 1794 he participated in a Grand Council at Niagara where he is reported to have given a three-hour speech which unfortunately has not survived. The same year he was a signatory of the Treaty of Canandaigua.

Farmer's Brother delivered what is considered his most famous speech on the 21st of November 1798 at Genesee River in the newly formed New York State. His speech was presented alongside one from his contemporary, another notable Seneca Chief Red Jacket, before an assembled congregation of Chiefs from the Six Nations as well as other onlookers interested in hearing the esteemed speaker orate. In his speech, Farmer's Brother spoke on behalf of two American agents, Jasper Parrish and Horatio Jones, who had been captured by, and worked with, the Six Nations closely before eventually being adopted by them. Farmer's Brother requested that the two interpreters be granted a (2 mile/3 kilometer) plot of land for their contributions to the Nations and their continued loyalty after the war. The speech was considered remarkable by onlookers for Farmer's Brother's eloquence and the use of the line "the Great spirit spoke to the whirlwind and it was still" which had a resounding impact on many present. At this time, however, without the states' approval it was not possible to transfer any land belonging to Nations to private owners. Because of this the address was transcribed and sent to the New York legislature where the proposition was eventually approved.

During the War of 1812 he fought on the side of the United States despite his advanced age. He participated in an engagement near Fort George on August 17, 1813, and in the Battle of Lundy's Lane in 1814. Following that battle a story is related that an Indian allied with the British (variously Chippewa or Mohawk) came to the Seneca saying he was deserting. He was identified as a spy, and Farmer's Brother said to him "here are my rifle, my tomahawk, and my scalping knife: take your choice by which you will die." The spy chose the rifle and indicated he wanted to be shot through the heart (or head), so Farmer's Brother immediately pointed his rifle there and killed him.

== Personal ==
Farmer's Brother has been described as

A strong, stalwart warrior, of gigantic frame and magnificent proportions, straight as an arrow ... with eagle eye, frank, open countenance, commanding port, and dignified demeanor.

His exact birthdate is unknown, 1716, 1718, or 1732 have also been suggested.

Farmer's Brother was a cousin (or half-brother) of Hiokatoo, who married Mary Jemison. According to Jemison "it was through the influence of Farmer's Brother that I became Hiokatoo's wife." In the negotiations preliminary to the Treaty of Big Tree Farmer's Brother supported Jemison's request that a section of land which had been promised to her be set aside as a reservation. Although opposed by Red Jacket, Farmer's Brother won the day and the 17,927-acre (7,255 ha) Gardeau Reservation was set aside for her following her description.

It has been recounted that despite his name, Farmer's Brother was generally opposed to the practice of farming along with other conventions that settlers attempted to impress on his people. He alongside Red Jacket resisted the encroachment of European missionaries into their territory and stood firmly against the missionaries attempts to indoctrinate the Seneca people into their faith. Farmer's Brother is also said to have died never having tried alcohol, showing disdain for it and abstaining from it out of principle.

=== Death ===
Farmer's Brother died of natural causes on an unspecified date in the autumn of 1814. Out of respect for his character and contributions the 5th Infantry Regiment buried him with full military honors in Buffalo, New York. In March 1915 to make way for the expanding city his body and grave, alongside others, were moved to Forest Lawn Cemetery (Buffalo). During the process of exhuming his grave a brass tablet was discovered with his initials on it but it was lost in the moving process.

== Name ==
The name Honayawas is said to have a "vulgar meaning". It has been variously spelled Honanyawus, Onayawos, Ouayawos, Honayewus, etc.

He is said to have been given the name "Farmer's Brother" by George Washington. Washington wanted to make agriculture respectable among the Native Americans and in conversation with Honayawas indicated that he himself was a farmer, and called him a brother. Honayawas was proud of meeting Washington and adopted the name.
