= Little Billy (Seneca chief) =

Little Billy (died 1834, in Buffalo, New York) was a chief of the Seneca Nation of Haudenosaunee (Iroquois), also known as Tishkaaga, Gishkaka, Juskakaka, and Jishkaaga. He was a signer of several treaties with the United States government, including the Treaty of Canandaigua in 1794, and the Treaty of Big Tree in 1797.

Little Billy, along with Cornplanter, was a Chief Warrior of the Seneca. His name means Green Grasshopper, or Katydid.

In the lead-up to the War of 1812, on September 8, 1812, he addressed the Seneca leaders in Buffalo to encourage them to volunteer in support of the Americans, saying: "The path of peace is broken in every part." He distinguished himself in the war, including taking part in the successful American attack against the British at Fort George, Ontario, on August 17, 1813.

An annuity of $50 was appropriated to Little Billy by federal statute in 1832 and 1833.

Little Billy died at "the Seneca village, Buffalo Creek, December 28, 1834", was originally buried in the Old Mission burying ground in Buffalo, and later reburied, along with Red Jacket, Young King, Destroy Town, Captain Pollard, Pollard's wife Catherine and granddaughter, Tall Peter, and nine others (possibly including Two Guns, Twenty Canoes, John Snow, and White Chief), in Buffalo's Forest Lawn Cemetery in 1884.

His date of birth is unknown, but he was apparently quite old at the time of his death. He is asserted to be the "Jes-ka-ka-ke" who guided George Washington on his mission to Fort Duquesne in 1753, implying that he may have been born around 1735. (Note: However, Washington describes Jeskakake as "old" in 1753)
