= Seneca mission =

Christian mission to the Seneca people in New York

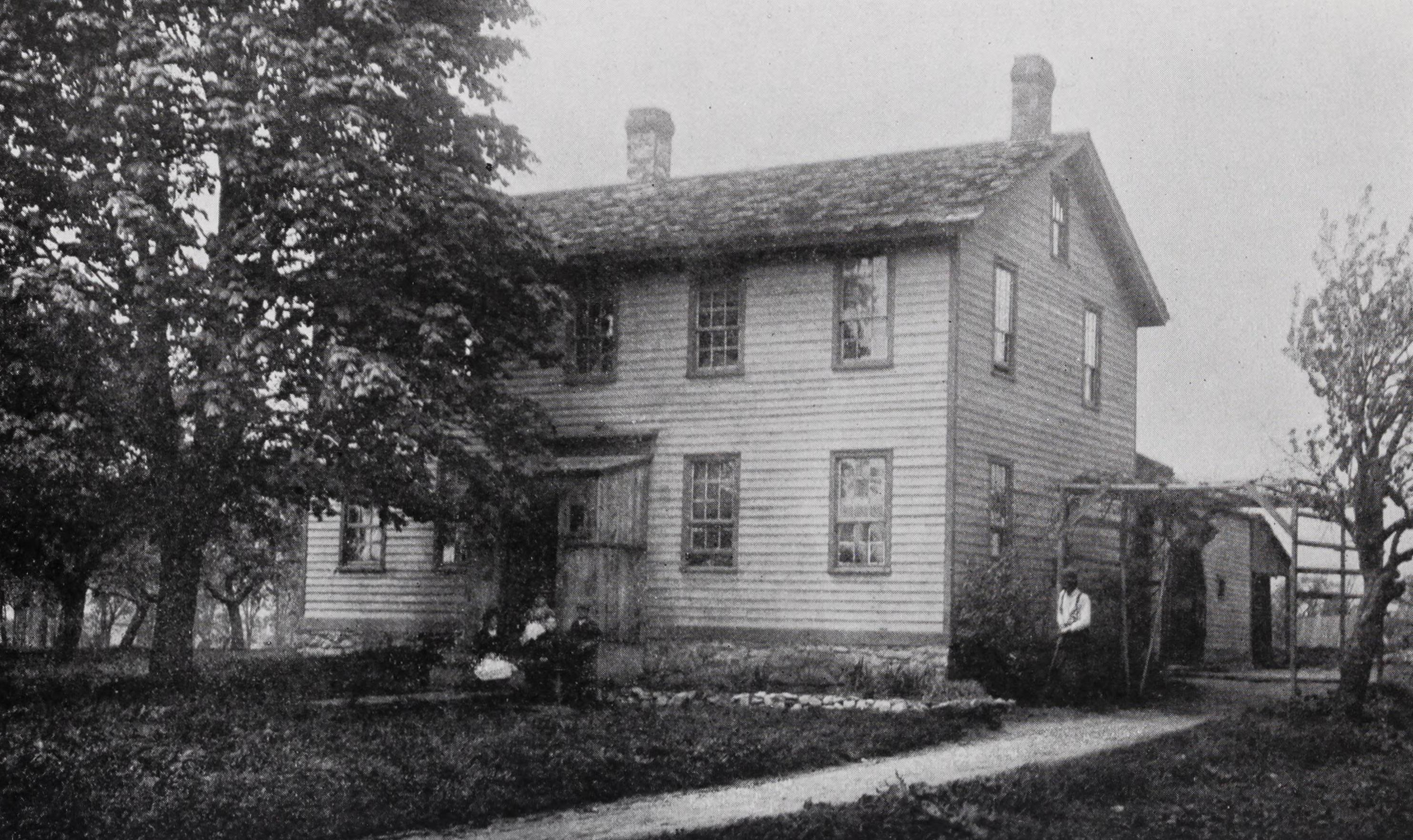
Photograph of the Seneca mission house, c. 1912.

The Seneca mission, sometimes called the Buffalo Creek mission, was a Christian mission to the Seneca people living in and around the Buffalo Creek Reservation in western New York. It was maintained, by several leaders and under the supervision of numerous missionary societies, from the early to mid-19th century. Some Seneca people accepted the mission; others, including Red Jacket and his followers, were strenuously opposed. Missionaries affiliated with the Seneca mission, including Asher Wright, transcribed the Seneca language into the Roman alphabet and printed Christian literature in Seneca.

== Background ==
Presbyterian missions were active in the Buffalo Creek Reservation, Allegany Indian Reservation, and Cattaraugus Reservation, located in western New York State, from the 1820s to the 1850s. The leadership and staff of the Tuscarora mission and Cattaraugus mission, in these neighboring areas, sometimes overlapped with that of the Seneca mission. Settlement of the Buffalo Creek Reservation, where the Seneca mission was centered, began in 1780.

Contemporary and modern historians divide the Senecas into two "camps" as of 1820. The Christian camp, led by a man known as Captain Pollard or Colonel Pollard, supported the missions. The "pagan" camp was led by Red Jacket, who spoke out against the missions and petitioned DeWitt Clinton, New York's governor, for assistance against them.

== Early missions (1764–1811) ==
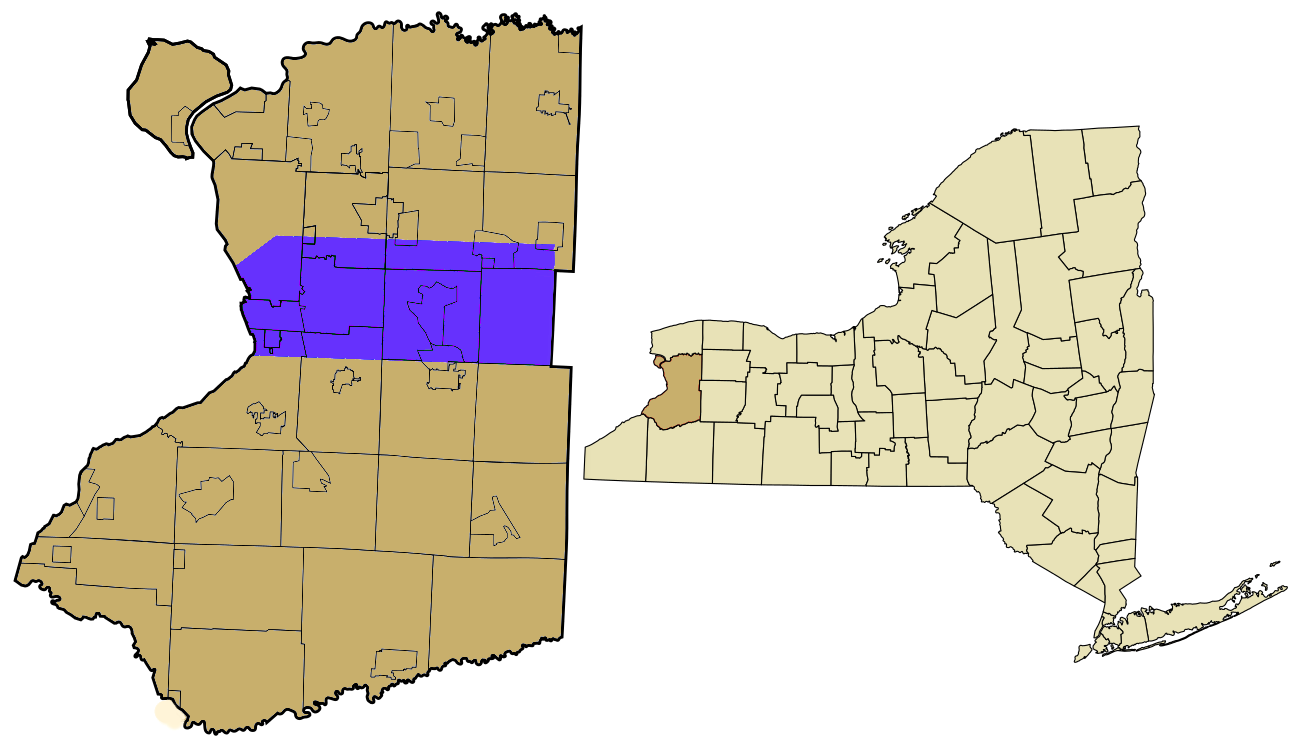
Location of the Buffalo Creek Reservation in Erie County (left) and New York (right).

In 1764, Samuel Kirkland visited the Senecas, intending to convert them to Christianity. He returned home after two years, and soon after commenced a mission among the Oneida people. About 1765, the Quakers, with the support of George Washington, began missions in New York among the Seneca. Over 20 years, they spent more than $40,000, supporting schools among other institutions. A Quaker mission was founded near Allegany in May 1798, which later grew to encompass the Cattaraugus area as well.

In 1800, the New York Missionary Society sent Elkanah Holmes (1744–1832) as a missionary to the Tuscarora people and the Seneca people. From a report presented at their annual meeting on April 5, 1802, it appears that he established a headquarters at Niagara. (Note: The sources do not make clear which "Niagara" is meant. Possible locations include Niagara Falls, New York, or another place in Niagara County, New York.) In April 1801, Holmes visited New York with proposals to build two school houses: one at Buffalo Creek, the other at a Tuscarora village about four miles from Lewiston.

The Senecas had earlier rejected a missionary "sent from Boston". This was presumably Jacob Cram (1762–1833), a missionary affiliated either with the Society for Propagating Christian Knowledge or the Massachusetts Missionary Society, whom they had rejected. (Note: Howland refers to a missionary with the surname Cram affiliated with the Society for Propagating Christian Knowledge, whereas Dennis and Bellin describe him as a member of the Massachusetts Missionary Society.) On his visit to New York, Holmes received about $190 in support of a school at Buffalo Creek. Upon his return, efforts were made to establish a missionary school in the area. Handsome Lake was against building a school at Buffalo Creek, but later accepted the idea. Holmes was confirmed as permanent missionary at a salary of $500 on April 3, 1803.

Holmes lived at the Tuscarora village until he came to disagree with the Society regarding the formation of a church among the Tuscaroras. An agent was sent to investigate, who reported that Holmes' views were against those of Society management and noted that Holmes evinced "pseudo-Baptist leanings". Holmes accordingly resigned in 1807 or 1808, after which he was employed by the Baptists as an itinerant preacher.

In 1809, Andrew Gray succeeded Holmes as missionary to the Tuscaroras, and J. C. Crane of New Jersey was sent to that village as a teacher. Crane later became the head of the mission, at which post he remained until his death in January 1826. In 1811 the Society sent John Alexander as a missionary to the Senecas at Buffalo Creek, but after meeting with the chiefs in council he found them still suspicious that some attempt was on foot to gain possession of their lands, and they refused to receive him.

== Alexander and Hyde ministry (1811–1821) ==
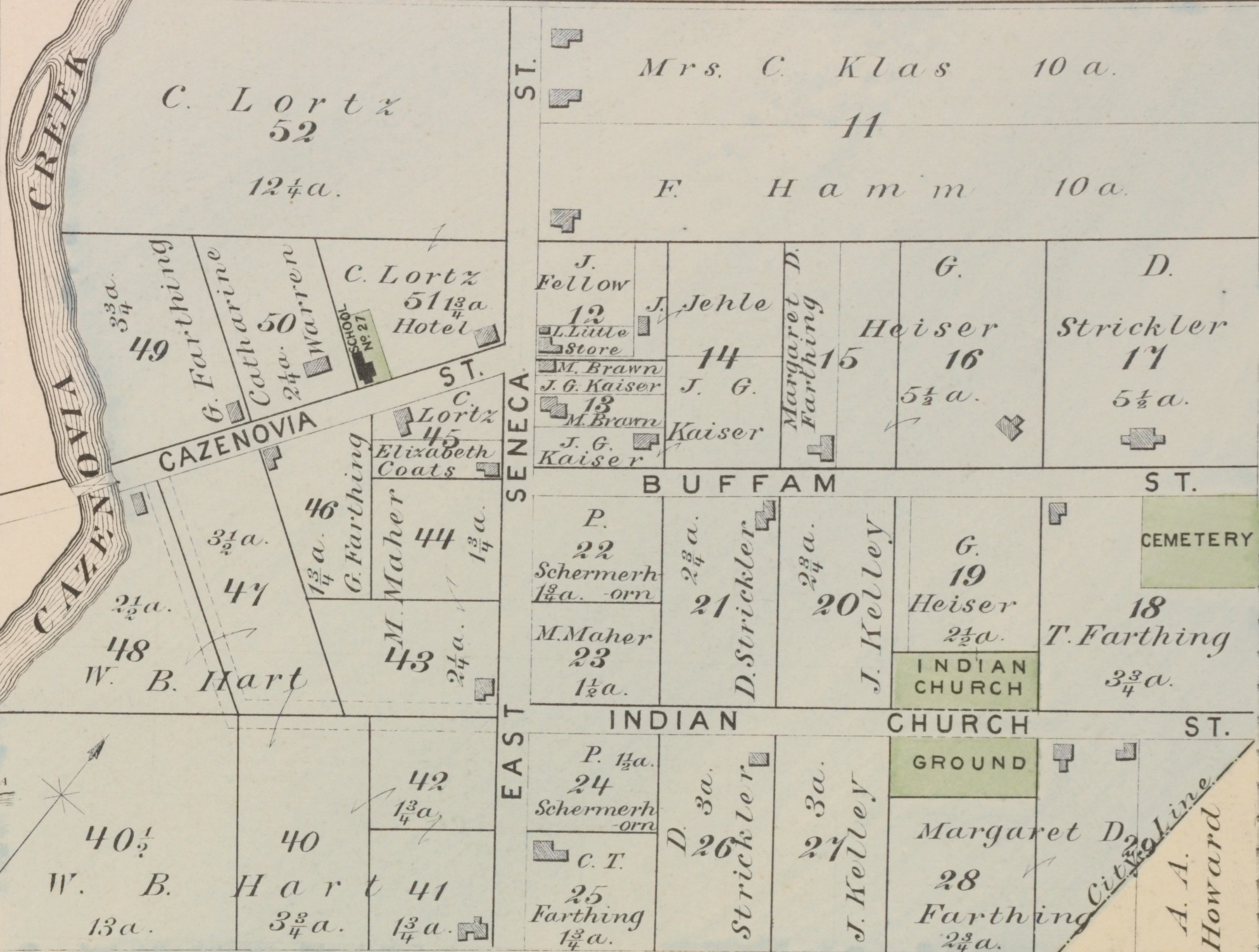
Detail of a map of Buffalo, New York, c. 1880, showing the location of the mission church.

The mission at the ''Seneca village'', about 4 miles east of Buffalo, on Buffalo Creek, was begun by the New-York Missionary Society in 1811, and transferred to the United Foreign Missionary Society in 1821. In 1811, John Alexander and Jabez Backus Hyde were sent to the Seneca with the hope of forming a permanent mission. Alexander was initially refused entry, while Hyde was invited to remain and establish a school, which he did in 1811. Hyde continued at the mission as a teacher until 1819, when he was appointed as a catechist; James Young replaced him as teacher. Hyde was replaced by Thompson S. Harris in 1821.

A manuscript by Hyde dated August 8, 1820, titled Account of the Seneca Indians and Mission, in the collection of the Buffalo Historical Society, (Note: See OCLC 52728193.) explains Hyde's experiences at the mission. After waiting seven months he opened his school. At the annual meeting of the Society on April 7, 1812, it was reported that "his conduct has been prudent and upright and he has succeeded in erecting a school house near the center of the Seneca settlement, where he now resides". He says: "The war took place the next summer … which threw everything into confusion on the frontier".

== Harris ministry (1821–1831) ==
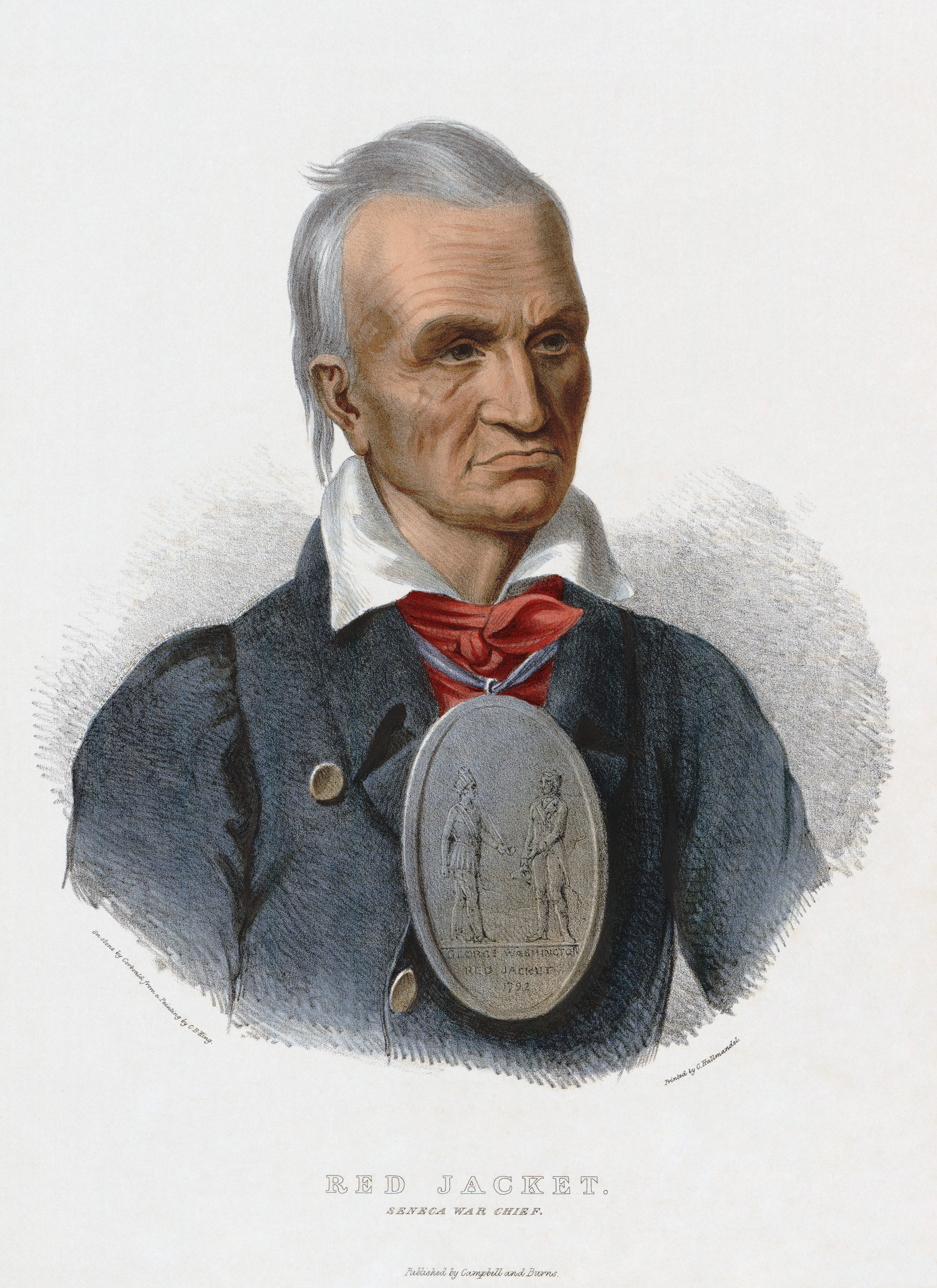
Lithograph of Red Jacket, 1835.

In January 1821, the Seneca mission was formally transferred to the United Foreign Missionary Society. On September 19, 1821, Thompson S. Harris, a recent graduate of Princeton College and Seminary and a licentiate of the Presbytery of New Brunswick, was appointed missionary for the Buffalo Creek Reservation. His wife, Marianne La Tournette, accompanied him.

Harris reached the mission station on November 2, 1821. On his arrival, Harris had brought a letter to the Indians from the United States Department of War commending the mission and the school. At the mission station, besides the Harrises and the Youngs there were two assistants, Miss Van Patten and Miss Reeve. Later on, Phoebe Selden of Hartford, Connecticut (from 1826 to 1833), and Asenath Bishop of Homer, New York (from February 23, 1823, to November 1841), were among the mission staff. Nancy Henderson was at the mission from 1824 until 1830; Emily Root, from 1827 to 1833; and Rebecca Newhall, from 1828 to 1832. From 1828 to 1830 or 1831 a Mr. Morton was in charge of the school and his wife was one of the assistants.

On December 5, 1821, Harris spoke with Jasper Parrish, United States Agent for the Six Nations, who, according to Harris, "appear[ed] to be friendly to our establishment and anxious for the improvement of the people.

In 1821, the New York State Legislature passed a law requiring county-level officials to remove white people from reservations, after Red Jacket and others complained about incursions into their territory. Some Christians petitioned the legislature from 1822 to 1824 to change the law, but were initially unsuccessful. Red Jacket and his followers, with whom "some white pagans joined", entered a formal complaint against the mission staff remaining on the reservation. They were successful; in March 1824, the mission was broken up by court order. A year later, however, the law was changed and Harris returned to the mission in June 1825; the mission recommenced operations by the fall of that year. Upon his return Harris began supervising the missions at Cattaraugus and the Tuscarora village in addition to the one at Seneca.

The schoolteacher, James Young, did not return to the mission with Harris at this time and his place was filled by Gilman Clark, who served until in 1827 he was compelled to resign "on account of ill health". An important coadjutor at this time was Hanover Bradley, who with his wife (Catharine Wheeler) had joined the family at Christmas, 1823, as steward and farmer, afterward becoming a catechist. Harris resigned from the mission on June 28, 1830, and for a short time the mission was under Bradley's supervision.

On July 31, 1826, the United States Foreign Missionary Society was merged into the American Board of Commissioners for Foreign Missions, and the Seneca mission was transferred to its control.

== Wright ministry (1831–1846) ==
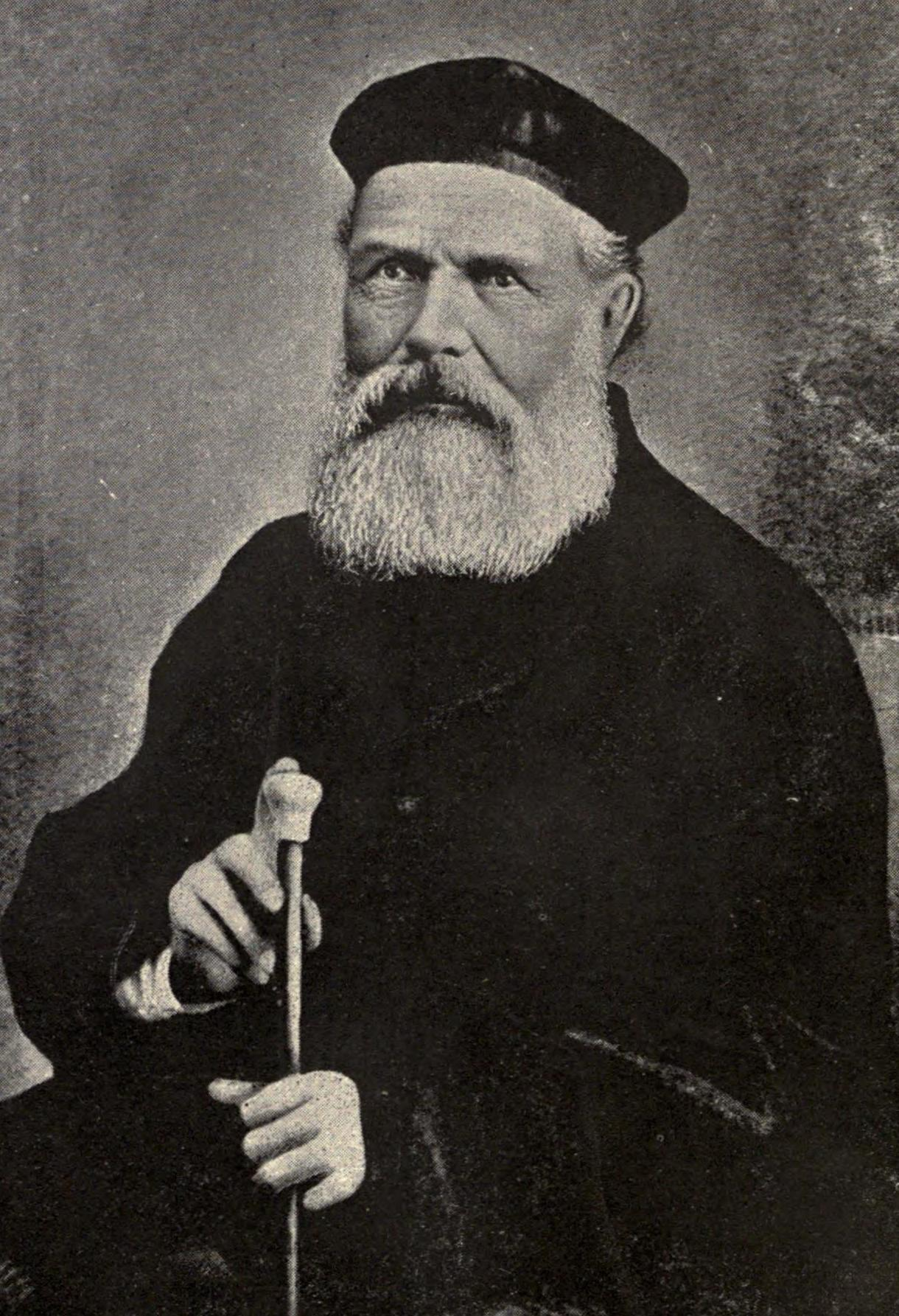
Photograph of Asher Wright, published 1892.

Asher Wright's ministry began on November 9, 1831, and lasted until his death on April 13, 1875. Wright was born in Hanover, New Hampshire, in 1803, and had recently graduated from Andover Seminary. He brought his wife Martha Egerton of Randolph, Vermont, with him, but she died soon thereafter and he married again on January 21, 1833. His second wife was Laura M. Sheldon of St. Johnsbury, Vermont (1809 – January 21, 1886).

Wright developed a system for writing Seneca while at the mission. The first book printed in Seneca using Wright's system was a small primer published in Boston in 1836 for the mission school's use.

In 1841, Wright founded the Mission Press. Benjamin C. Van Duzee came to the mission that year and was employed as a printer. The press was set up in a "lean-to" attached to the house and its earliest publication was the first issue of a small eight-page periodical entitled Ne Jaguhnigoages-gwathah—in English, The Mental Elevator—which was launched on November 30, 1841.

Nineteen eight-page issues of The Mental Elevator were printed. They appeared at irregular intervals, nine of them having been printed at the Buffalo Creek Reservation, the ninth issue dated April 1, 1845. In 1846, when the Buffalo Creek Reservation was given up, the press was moved to the Cattaraugus reservation, where ten more issues were printed.

In 1842, Wright published A Spelling Book in the Seneca Language with English Definitions, a work which compiled Wright's linguistic efforts in developing a Seneca alphabet, work which involved self-devised phonetic systems and other linguistic methods.

The Treaty of Buffalo Creek, January 15, 1838, as amended June 11, 1838, proclaimed by President Martin Van Buren in April 1839, expelled a large number of Indigenous people from western New York. However, a second treaty was entered into on May 20, 1842, by which the Senecas retained the Allegheny and Cattaraugus lands but gave the Buffalo Creek and Tonawanda reservations to the Ogden Land Company. The Tonawanda Senecas ultimately regained their land by purchase.

The Wrights remained at the Seneca station until 1845 or 1846, when the Senecas were expelled from the Buffalo Creek Reservation and sent to Cattaraugus. The mission at Buffalo Creek ended with the Senecas' expulsion, but Wright remained as a minister in Cattaraugus.

== After the Wright ministry ==
The Seneca mission survived in some form as late as 1885, when the missionary Morton F. Trippe wrote in a profile of the Seneca that the mission "comprise[d] five reservations—four in New York and one in Pennsylvania—with a total Indian population of 3,849, occupying 102 square miles or 65,338 acres, 21,890 of which are under cultivation."

== See also ==
- Treaty of Big Tree

== Sources ==
- Chapin, Walter (1825). The Missionary Gazetteer. Woodstock, Vermont: David Watson. pp. 319–322.
- Cumming, John (1979). "A Missionary Among the Senecas: The Journal of Abel Bingham, 1822–1828". New York History. 60 (2): 157–193. ISSN 0146-437X. JSTOR 23169601.
- Dennis, Matthew (February 23, 2012). Seneca Possessed: Indians, Witchcraft, and Power in the Early American Republic. University of Pennsylvania Press. ISBN 978-0-8122-0708-8.
- Densmore, Christopher (1999). Red Jacket: Iroquois Diplomat and Orator. Syracuse University Press. ISBN 0-585-28174-2. OCLC 45729390.
- Fenton, William N. (1956). "Toward the Gradual Civilization of the Indian Natives: The Missionary and Linguistic Work of Asher Wright (1803–1875) among the Senecas of Western New York". Proceedings of the American Philosophical Society. 100 (6): 567–581. ISSN 0003-049X. JSTOR 3143790.
- Hauptman, Laurence M. (1999). Conspiracy of Interests: Iroquois Dispossession and the Rise of New York State. Syracuse University Press. ISBN 0-585-24811-7. OCLC 45731442.
- Howland, Henry Raymond (1903). "The Seneca Mission at Buffalo Creek". In Severance, Frank H. (ed.). Publications of the Buffalo Historical Society. Vol. 6. Buffalo Historical Society; Cornell University Library New York State Historical Literature. pp. 125–161. hdl:2027/coo.31924067076905.
- Nicholas, Mark A. (2006). "Practicing Local Faith & Local Politics: Senecas, Presbyterianism, and a "New Indian Mission History"". Pennsylvania History. 73 (1): 69–101. ISSN 0031-4528. JSTOR 27778719.
- Wallace, Anthony F. C. (1972). The Death and Rebirth of the Seneca. New York: Vintage Books. ISBN 978-0-307-76056-2. OCLC 795249676.
