= Young King =

Young King may refer to:

- Henry the Young King, the eldest son and heir apparent of King Henry II of England, crowned as King of England during his father's reign
- Young King (magazine)
- Young King (Seneca chief)

== See also ==
- The Young King by Oscar Wilde
