= Boyd and Parker ambush =

American Revolutionary War battle in 1779

Coordinates: 42.717064°N 77.727602°W

- Part of the Sullivan Expedition
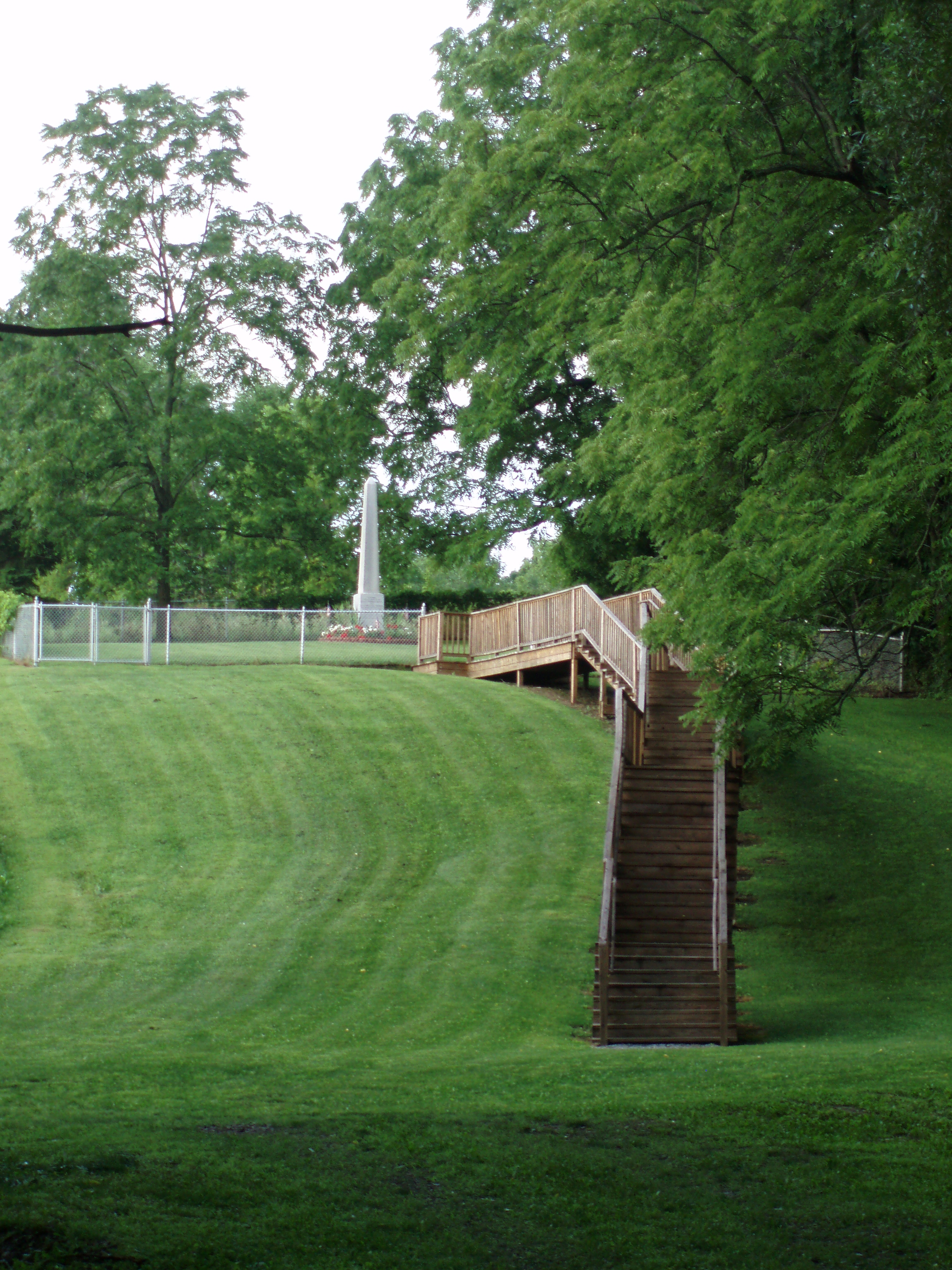
- Groveland Ambuscade Park commemorating the ambush
Date	September 13, 1779
Location	Groveland, New York
Result	British-Seneca victory

Belligerents
United States	Great Britain; Seneca

Commanders and leaders
(United States) Lieutenant Thomas Boyd †	Major John Butler; Cornplanter; Little Beard

Strength
24	400

Casualties and losses
14 killed 3 captured and killed 7 escaped	1 Seneca killed

The Boyd and Parker ambush was a minor military engagement in what is now Groveland, New York, on September 13, 1779, during the American Revolutionary War. A scouting patrol of the Sullivan Expedition was ambushed by Loyalist soldiers, led by Major John Butler, and their Seneca allies, led by Cornplanter and Little Beard.

== Background ==
Following Native American raids in Upstate New York, General George Washington sent Major General John Sullivan with several thousand soldiers into the Finger Lakes Region to displace the Seneca and Cayuga; destroy their villages, crops, and food stores; and remove the threat to settlers.

== Prelude ==
Butler and the Seneca war chiefs had roughly 800 men to defend Seneca territory including Butler's Rangers. Sullivan had marched from Easton, Pennsylvania to the Wyoming Valley, then ascended the Susquehanna River to its confluence with the Chemung River.

After defeating Butler at the Battle of Newtown, Sullivan headed north into the Seneca homeland. His brigades proceeded up the eastern side of Seneca Lake to Kanadaseaga before heading west towards Chenussio, also known as Little Beard's Town.

Sullivan had camped at the site of Foot’s Corners in Conesus on Sunday, September 12, 1779, after marching from Honeoye Lake. That night, Lieutenant Thomas Boyd received orders to organize a scouting party to locate and reconnoiter Chenussio. Although the orders instructed him to take only a handful of men, Boyd took 26 soldiers with him, including Sergeant Michael Parker. Also with him was Thaosagwat, also known as Han Yost, an Oneida guide.

Meanwhile, about 400 Rangers and allied warriors were preparing to ambush the vanguard of Sullivan's army as it emerged from the marshy area south of Conesus Lake, unaware that Boyd's patrol had unknowingly passed them in the night.

== Ambush ==
The following morning, Boyd's patrol reached an abandoned village, which he believed was Chenussio. After sending four runners back to Sullivan, they spotted a group of four Seneca entering the village, and a brief skirmish followed. One Seneca was killed. Boyd then decided to return with his patrol to Sullivan's camp. On the trail, they spotted five Haudenosaunee who fled. Thaosagwat warned Boyd not to follow, but he ignored the warning, and the patrol stumbled upon the enemy’s lines. Surrounded and outnumbered, fourteen of Boyd’s men were killed. Seven escaped, while Boyd, Parker, and Thaosagwat were captured. Thaosagwat was immediately executed by Little Beard.

== Aftermath ==
Boyd and Parker were taken to Chenussio, where Butler questioned them. After Butler departed, Little Beard had Boyd and Parker tortured, mutilated, and decapitated. Local lore, stemming from Mary Jemison's 1824 biography, suggests that Boyd and Parker had their entrails secured to a tree and were forced to circle the tree so that their innards were drawn out. This particular detail, however, is not included in the journals kept by several members of the Sullivan Expedition, which describe the condition of the mangled bodies in gruesome detail.

An oak tree, which historical memory holds to be the tree to which Boyd was bound, is located in the Boyd and Parker Park in Leicester, New York and is known as the Torture Tree.

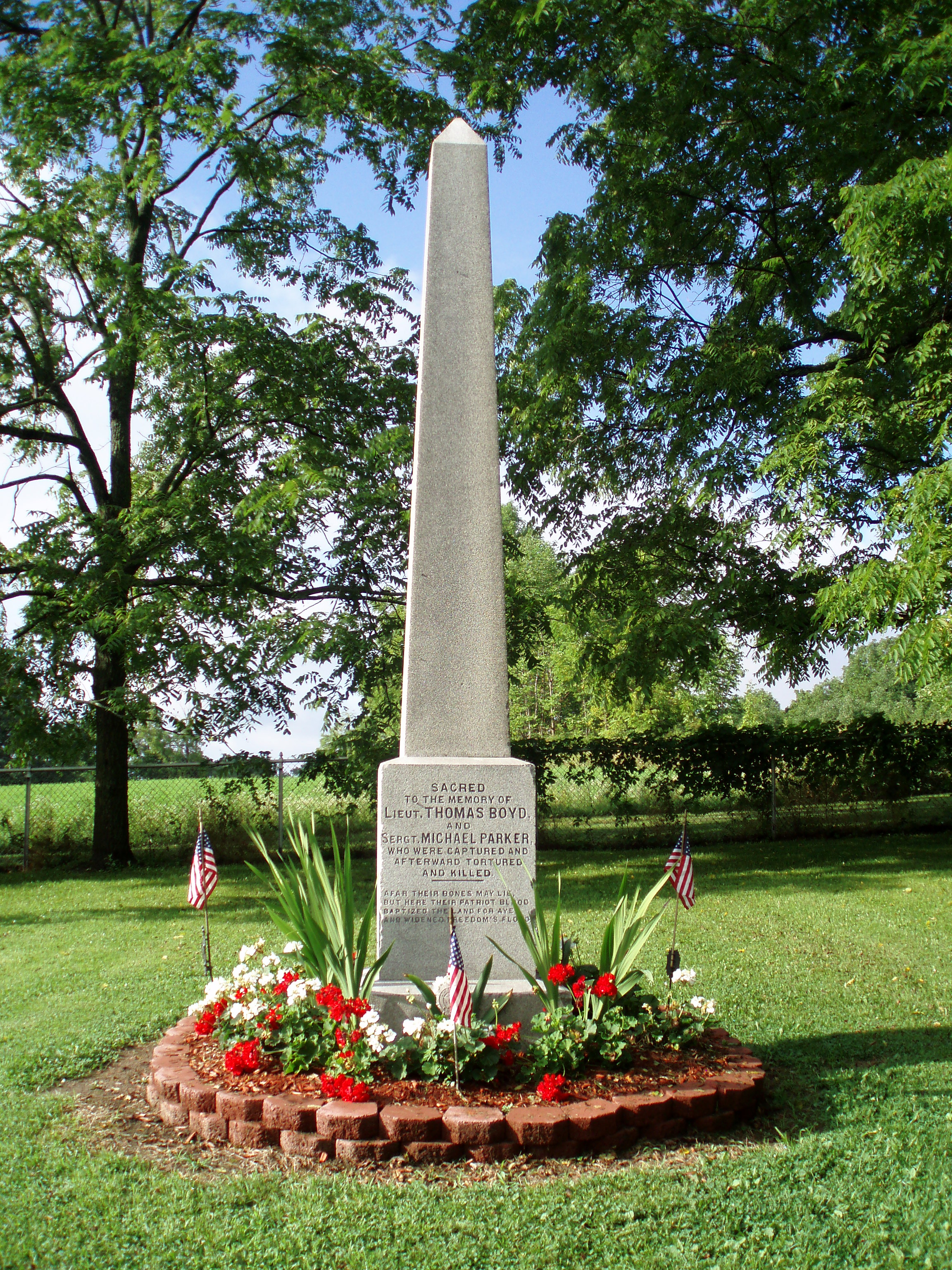
Monument to Boyd and Parker at the Groveland Ambuscade park

The bodies of Boyd and Parker were discovered by Sullivan's forces on September 14, and the men were buried with full military honors. Chenussio was razed to the ground, and the extensive fields of corn and vegetables surrounding it were destroyed. Sullivan then turned his army around and headed back towards Seneca Lake. The bodies of Thaosagwat and the 14 soldiers who died at the ambush site were discovered two days later.

Besides Boyd, Parker, and Thaosagwat, the names of 12 of the killed are known and are inscribed on a memorial located at the ambush site in Groveland, New York. One name on the memorial, Corporal Calhoun, refers to a soldier who died of his wounds in a separate encounter the same day as the Boyd and Parker ambush.

== Memorials ==
The remains of Boyd and Parker were left buried at the site of their deaths until 1841, when they were re-interred at Rochester's Mount Hope Cemetery in a ceremony attended by New York Governor William H. Seward.

Today, the Boyd & Parker Park and Groveland Ambuscade sites in Cuylerville and Groveland, respectively, mark the sites of Little Beard's Town and the ambush. Both sites were listed on the National Register of Historic Places in 2009. In September 2004, the ambush's 225th anniversary was commemorated at the site with a reenactment.

== In popular culture ==
The ambush is featured as a key event in the episode “Eerie Hall: Part 3” of the Netflix series True Haunting.
