= Little Beard's Town =

Human settlement in the Genesee River Valley, US

Coordinates: 42°46′N 77°52′W

Little Beard's Town, also known as Jo’néhsi:yo:h (in Seneca), Chenussio and "Genesee Castle", was a powerful Seneca town in the Genesee River Valley near modern Leicester in Livingston County, New York, where Cuylerville stands today.

It surrounded the area that is now Rt. 39, between Geneseo and Cuylerville, New York. At the time of its destruction by Sullivan, the town was located on the west side of the Genesee River. Ten years prior, it had been on the east side of the river, as the Seneca villages were generally moved approximately every 10 years.

The town was named after its founder, Little Beard, a prominent Seneca leader in the late 18th century. It was famous for its beautiful surroundings and the productivity of its vegetable gardens, fruit orchards, and fields of corn. It had about 130 houses-- "finely built log cabins with ample furnishings; some even had glass window panes," as well as a large council building, built around a central square. It was located near three other Seneca towns, all of which were destroyed during the Sullivan Expedition in the American Revolutionary War.

The Seneca and three other Haudenosaunee nations fought on the British side during the American Revolutionary War. Little Beard and his warriors participated in the Cherry Valley massacre and the Boyd and Parker ambush, in which two soldiers were brought to Little Beard's Town and tortured. Subsequently, troops of the Continental Army under Major General John Sullivan attacked Little Beard's Town and other Haudenosaunee settlements in the Genesee and Mohawk valleys, destroying buildings and crops. The residents had to flee.

"Little Beard's Town was burnt by Sullivan-Clinton’s forces on Sept. 14-15, 1779."

One famous resident fled with the Seneca to more secure villages, around Niagara Falls, with three children. This was Mary Jemison, a Scots-Irish immigrant colonist who had been captured by the Seneca at age 15 with her family, most of whom were killed. She was adopted and married into the tribe, and lived with them all her life.

A fictional account of the burning of the town is given in The Scouts of the Valley by Joseph A. Altsheler.

"The Men in Sullivans Army were so greatly impressed by the 22 inch long ears of corn, the fine vegetable gardens and the fruit orchards that many determined to return and settle on this land after the war." The site was reserved as a Seneca reservation in the 1797 Treaty of Big Tree, along with five other parcels on the Genesee River; they sold those parcels to the Ogden Land Company in 1826, a sale that the modern Seneca Nation of Indians does not recognize as valid.

In 2004, the 225th Anniversary of the Groveland Ambuscade and the Boyd-Parker Massacre, local historical societies set up a civilian camp for re-enactors at the site of Little Beard’s Town.
