= Cuylerville, New York =

- Census-designated place
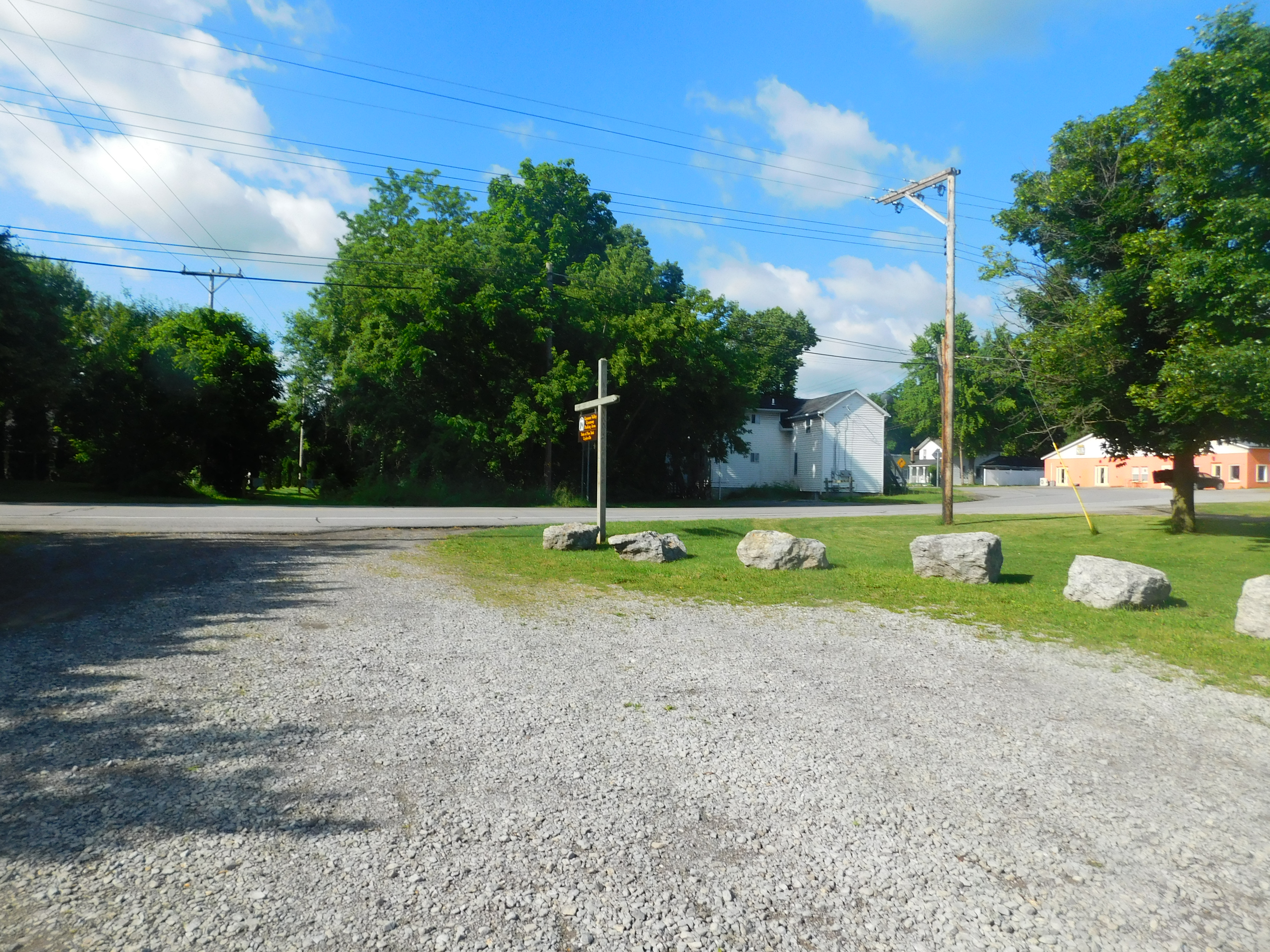
- The hamlet of Cuylerville as seen from the site of the former Pennsylvania Railroad station

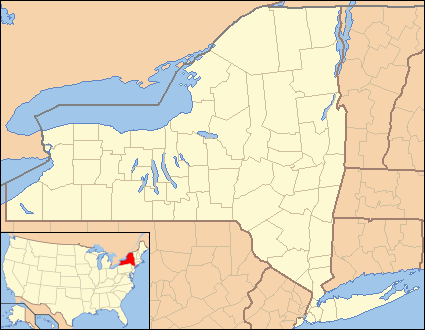
- Location within the state of New York
- Coordinates: 42°46′37″N 77°52′15″W
- Country: United States
- State: New York
- County: Livingston County
- Town: Leicester

Area
  - Total: 0.42 sq mi (1.09 km^{2})
  - Land: 0.42 sq mi (1.09 km^{2})
  - Water: 0 sq mi (0.00 km^{2})
- Elevation: 571 ft (174 m)

Population (2020)
  - Total: 268
  - Density: 635.9/sq mi (245.54/km^{2})
- Time zone: UTC-5 (Eastern (EST))
  - Summer (DST): UTC-4 (EDT)
- ZIP code: 14481 (Leicester)
- Area code: 585
- FIPS code: 36-19510
- GNIS feature ID: 947974

Cuylerville is a hamlet in the town of Leicester, in Livingston County, New York, United States. The population was 268 at the 2020 census, which lists the community as a census-designated place.

== History ==
The community was named for W. T. Cuyler, an early settler. The hamlet is located on the site of Little Beard's Town, a large Seneca village destroyed in the Sullivan Campaign. Mary Jemison, known as "the White Woman of the Genesee", lived here. The National Hotel was added to the National Register of Historic Places in 2004. Located near Cuylerville is the Boyd & Parker Park and Groveland Ambuscade, listed on the National Register of Historic Places in 2009.

== Geography ==
Cuylerville is in western Livingston County, in the eastern part of the town of Leicester. U.S. Route 20A and New York State Route 39 pass through the community together as Cuylerville Road, leading west 1.5 miles (2.4 km) to Leicester village and east 3.5 miles (5.6 km) to Geneseo, the Livingston county seat.

According to the U.S. Census Bureau, the Cuylerville CDP has an area of 0.42 square miles (1.09 km^{2}), all land. The hamlet sits at the western edge of the valley of the Genesee River.

== Demographics ==
Historical population
Census	Pop.	Note	%±
2020	268		—
U.S. Decennial Census
