= Laura Maria Sheldon Wright =

American missionary

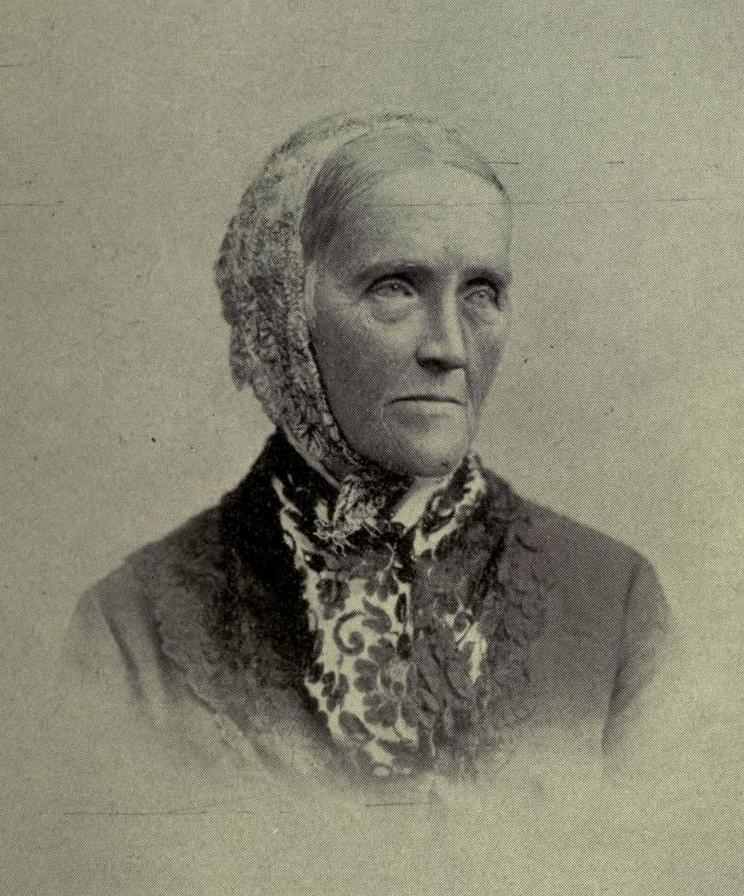
Photograph of Wright, published 1918.

Laura Maria Sheldon Wright (July 10, 1809 – January 21, 1886) was an American missionary.

Laura Maria Sheldon was born on July 10, 1809, in St. Johnsbury, Vermont. She grew up in St. Johnsbury and in Barnet, Vermont, and was educated at the Young Ladies' School.

She married Asher Wright on January 21, 1833, and the two moved to Buffalo Creek Reservation on February 5, 1833, to begin their mission. As a missionary, Laura wrote a school primer in Seneca and English and worked as a teacher. She also founded an organization called the Iroquois Temperance League.

She died of pneumonia on January 21, 1886, in Iroquois, New York, at the home of Nicholson Henry Parker (1819–1892), a Seneca interpreter.
