= Little Beard =

Seneca leader

- Si-gwa-ah-doh-gwih
- Died: June 1806; Leicester, New York
- Known for: Seneca chief active during the American Revolution

Little Beard or Si-gwa-ah-doh-gwih ("Spear Hanging Down") (died June 1806), was a Seneca chief who participated in the American Revolutionary War on the side of Great Britain. After the war, he continued to reside in New York.

In Notes on the Iroquois (1846), Henry Rowe Schoolcraft recorded a Seneca tradition, attributed to Oliver Silverheels, that “Little Beard the elder” was among eight Senecas sent on a peace embassy during the earlier wars between the Six Nations and the Cherokees.

During the war in 1778, Little Beard commanded a group of Seneca in Loyalist officer Walter Butler's raid that became known as the Cherry Valley massacre.

His village, Jo’néhsi:yo:h or Little Beard's Town, was located near two other Seneca villages in modern Leicester in Livingston County, New York, and consisted of about 128 houses. Little Beard participated in the Cherry Valley massacre of 1778, and presided over the torture and death of Boyd and Parker, captured scouts of the Sullivan Expedition of 1779. Subsequently, Little Beard's Town was destroyed by the American forces. Mary Jemison, then a resident of the village, fled with the natives to more secure villages. The modern town of Cuylerville was built at the spot.

Little Beard was one of the Seneca chiefs signing the Treaty of Canandaigua of 1794 that established some reservations for the Iroquois. He was also a signatory to the Treaty of Big Tree in 1797 that opened up Western New York for settlement. In 1802, the Seneca ceded Little Beard's Town, with many of its inhabitants moving to the Tonawanda Reservation.

According to historian Lockwood L. Doty, Little Beard died as the result of injuries received during a brawl at a tavern in Leicester, New York in June 1806.

His son, also known as Little Beard, led a group of approximately ninety Seneca into the War of 1812 on the side of the Americans. The hope was that service to the American cause would help them maintain their shrinking land base. The younger Little Beard later signed an 1826 treaty reducing the size of their existing reservations.
