= Nettie Parrish Martin =

Author

Marie Antoinette Parrish Hough Martin (1840 - October 28, 1915) under her pen name Nettie Parrish Martin wrote and published two books: Indian Legends of Early Days (January 1905 Mayhew Publishing Co), a book of Six Nations Iroquois legends, and A Pilgrim’s Progress in Other Worlds: Recounting the Wonderful Adventures of Ulysum Storries and His Discovery of the Lost Star Eden (1908 Mayhew Publishing Co), a work of early science fiction.

== Indian Legends of Early Days ==
“Indian Legends of Early Days” recounts in verse stories that were told to Martin by her grandmother, including "Oneidas", "The Lost Arrow", "Skaneateles", and "Pocahontas". In its forward Martin writes:

These "Indian Legends" were given to the writer by her grandmother, who lived near one of the Indian villages of the Six Nations, and spoke their language. Jasper Parrish, (a grandsire) was a missionary and trader among the six tribes, and during his sojourn among them he so endeared himself to all, they named him Sen-ne-oc-ta-wa, meaning "Good Man," and ever after his descendants had only to say that name and every care and kindness was cheerfully given them that the Indians were able to bestow.

The story, “The Lost Arrow” tells of a Six Nations warrior Os-sa-hin-ta, who is given a special arrowhead of “red flint flecked and streaked with white” that ensures prosperity for its owner. According to the New York Weekly Observer, in 1967, the founder of the Deer Lick Museum in Cattaraugus County, New York stated that he was inspired by the local discovery of an arrowhead matching Martin's description to create the museum.

== A Pilgrim’s Progress in Other Worlds ==
A Pilgrim’s Progress in Other Worlds is a novel about interplanetary travel. It is both science fiction and utopian literature. Its hero, Ulyssum Storries, creates a "skycycle" ("a bird-like flying machine powered by electricity and capable of Space Flight") to take him into outer space where he visits Earth's moon, Venus, Mars, Jupiter, Saturn, and finally the Sun. Each world he visits has a different society, each with a unique relationship between the sexes, leading the protagonist to explore the condition of women across societies. The novel was reviewed by The Publishers' Weekly in 1908:

He goes to other places in a purely unscientific and unimaginative manner, and returns after ten years, to "smash up" on his own Indiana farm, and to eat his Christmas dinner at his wife's side. The amusing thing in the book is the hero's name, U-ly-sum. By thus carefully dividing it the amusement may be obtained; otherwise the tale is serious, or seriously intended.

A list of Science Fiction and Utopias by Women, 1818–1949 compiled by L. Timmel Duchamp includes A Pilgrims Progress in Other Worlds. A Pilgrim’s Progress in Other Worlds is cited in many anthologies including American Fiction 1901-1925 and Science Fiction and Fantasy Literature, Volume 1. In The Bookman: A Review of Books and Life the reviewer notes:

The author states that this book was suggested by a dream in which her two little boys came from some other world and took her away with them among the stars.

To ignore the Christian thrust of this imaginative novel is of course a temptation, as the conservative, Missionary tone of the work may seem at odds with contemporary feminist readings. Martin does indeed examine women's role in society, but the overarching project is Dantesque without the demons: to explore the layers and levels of Christian ideology across the extended metaphor of a solar system. The characters are often allegorical (Reliable, Obedience ...) and the quest is the spreading and examination of Biblical truths.

The dedication is to the author's parents. « who, by example and patient teaching taught me early to love the Bible Truths, my Heavenly Father and his son our savior... »

== Republication ==
Indian Legends of Early Days has been republished by Leopold Classic Library, while A Pilgrim’s Progress in Other Worlds is available as an e-book.
