= Treaty of Big Tree =

1797 treaty between the United States and Seneca

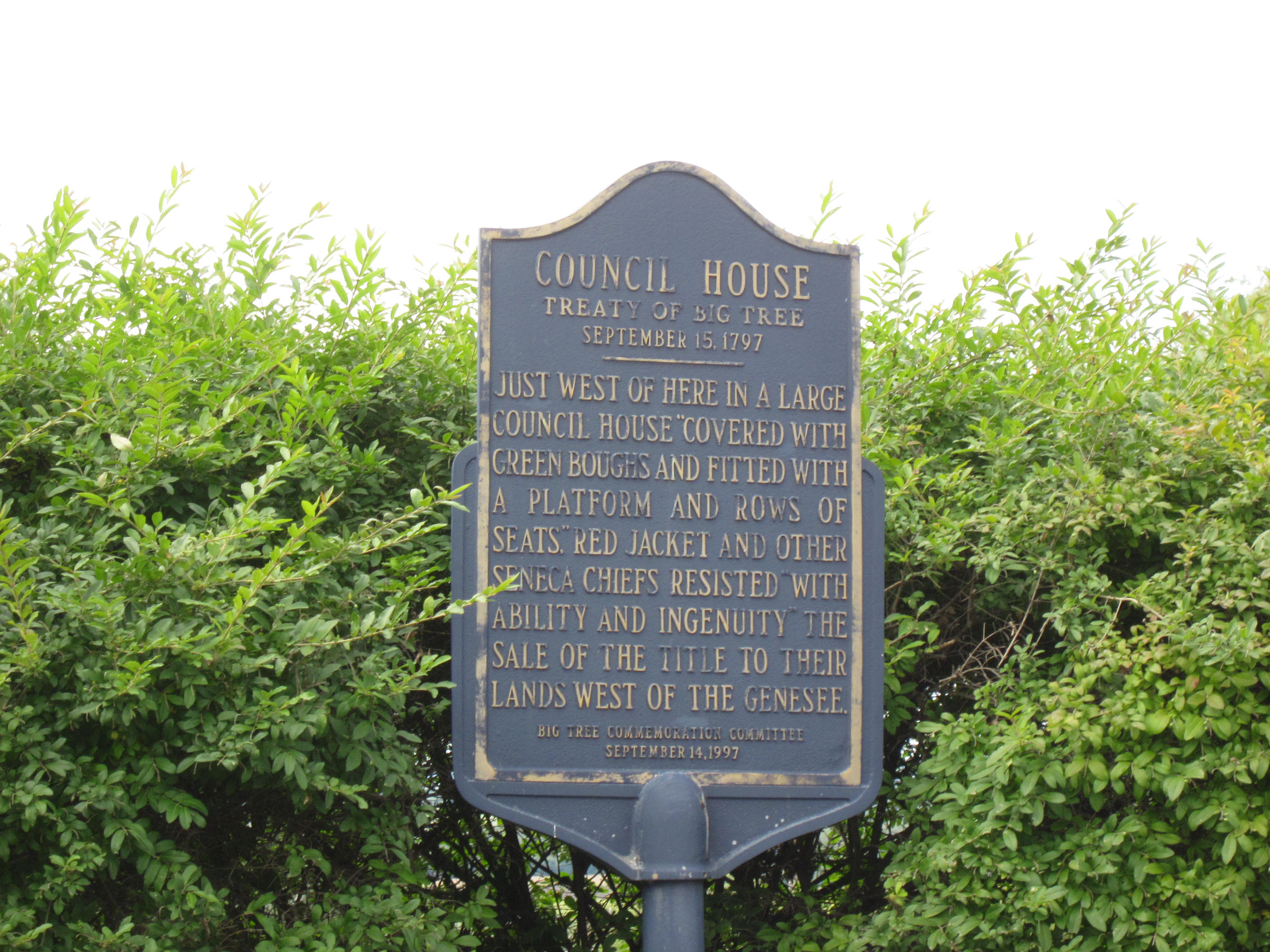
- Modern-day marker describing the treaty on the campus of SUNY Geneseo
- Type: United States and Native American treaty
- Signed: September 16, 1797; 229 years ago
- Location: Genesee River in Seneca territory (in the present-day Town of Geneseo, New York)
- Replaces: Treaty of Canandaigua
- Replaced by: Second Treaty of Buffalo Creek
- Parties: Seneca people; United States
- Language: English

The Treaty of Big Tree was a treaty signed in 1797 between the Seneca Nation and the United States, in which the Seneca relinquished their rights to nearly all of their traditional homeland in New York State—nearly 3.5 million acres. In the 1788 Phelps and Gorham Purchase, the Haudenosaunee (Iroquois) had previously sold rights to their land between Seneca Lake and the Genesee River. The Treaty of Big Tree signed away their rights to all their territory west of the Genesee River (except 12 small tracts of land) for $100,000 and other considerations (roughly $5 billion in 2020 dollars, in relation to GDP). The money was not paid directly to the tribe, but was to be invested in shares of the Bank of the United States, and to be paid out to the Senecas in annual earnings of up to six percent, or $6,000 a year, on the bank stock.

== History ==
The delegates for both parties met from August 20, 1797, until September 16, 1797, at the rustic log cabin of James and William Wadsworth, early settlers and land agents in the area, in what is now Geneseo, New York.

In attendance were nearly 3000 Seneca and other prominent members of the Six Nations of the Haudenosaunee. Representing them were their hoyaneh chiefs: Cornplanter, Red Jacket, Young King, Little Billy, Farmer's Brother, Handsome Lake, Tall Chief, Little Beard and others; the clan mothers of the nation; and Mary Jemison. Those in attendance representing the United States were: Colonel Jeremiah Wadsworth, Commissioner, who was assigned by President George Washington to represent the United States government; Captain Charles Williamson and Thomas Morris, representing his father; Robert Morris; General William Shepard, representing Massachusetts; William Bayard, representing New York; Captain Israel Chapin, representing the Department of Indian Affairs; and James Rees as acting secretary. The official interpreters were Horatio Jones and Jasper Parrish. Also in attendance were representatives of the Holland Land Company including William Bayard, Joseph Ellicott (surveyor), John Lincklaen, Gerrit Boon, Jan Gabriel van Staphorst and Roelof Van Staphorst. Mary Jemison, known as The White Woman of the Genesee, who was captured in a raid and ended up marrying her Seneca captor, was an able negotiator for the tribe and helped win them more favorable terms.

According to accounts, all of the treaty delegates for the United States were housed in the Wadsworths' log cabin. A council house was erected nearby by the Seneca, and proceedings were held there. The treaty was signed on September 16, 1797, after nearly a month of often heated back-and-forth negotiations. Following negotiations, Robert Morris requested the $100,000 principal revert to his heirs if “the Seneca nation” should ever “become extinct.” The presiding secretaries of Treasury and State denied his request. This treaty is substantial as it opened up the rest of the territory west of the Genesee River for settlement and established twelve reservations, perpetual annuities and hunting and fishing rights for the Seneca in Western New York.

== Namesake ==
The treaty was signed near the present-day village of Geneseo, New York. At the time, the area was known as Big Tree from the nearby Seneca village of Big Tree, just over the Genesee River in present-day Leicester. The village was likely named after Ga-on-dah-go-waah’or Karontowanen, a chief referred to by the title Big Tree, roughly translating to "tree-prone-big" or "great tree, lying down."

Local lore has conflated the name of the chief and village of Big Tree with the famous "Big Tree" or "Wadsworth Oak," which grew on the eastern bank of the Genesee River in Geneseo. The oak was noted for its immense circumference and was the subject of several paintings. While the treaty was signed not far from it, the idea of a tree lying prostrate, as suggested by the Seneca name, does not describe the oak as it stood during the events of 1797. Following the signing of the treaty, the Big Tree became a popular sightseeing destination for white settlers.

The Big Tree was washed from the banks of the river in late 1857 by a flood. Earlier that year, its trunk's circumference had been measured at 26 feet and 9 inches. The Livingston County Historical Society Museum in Geneseo houses a restored section of the tree, which is believed to be its last remaining remnant not turned into furniture by a 19th-century woodworker.

== Seneca Nation reservations ==
The following reservations were guaranteed by the treaty:

- Along the Genesee River, the former Seneca heartland

one piece or parcel of the aforesaid tract, at Canawaugas [fetid waters, now Avon, New York], of two square miles, to be laid out in such manner as to include the village extending in breadth one mile along the river

one other piece or parcel at Big Tree [Gen-nis'-he-yo, Beautiful Valley], of two square miles, to be laid out in such manner as to include the village, extending in breadth along the river one mile

one other piece or parcel of two square miles at Little Beard's Town [Do-oh-nun-da-gah-a, Where the Hill is Near], extending one mile along the river, to be laid off in such manner as to include the village

one other tract of two square miles at Squawky Hill [De-yu-it-ga-oh Valley Begins To Widen, Leicester, New York], to be laid off as follows, to wit: one square mile to be laid off along the river, in such manner as to include the village, the other directly west thereof and contiguo's thereto

one other piece or parcel at Gardeau [Ga-da'-o, Bank in Front Mount Morris, New York], beginning at the mouth of Steep Hill creek, thence due east until it strikes the old path, thence south until a due west line will intersect with certain steep rocks on the west side of Genesee river, then extending due west, due north and due east, until it strikes the first mentioned bound, enclosing as much land on the west side as on the east side of the river. [28 sq mi]

One other piece or parcel at Kaounadeau [Can-e-a-de'-a, Where the Heavens Rest on the Earth] extending in length eight miles along the river and two miles in breadth.

- Western New York

One other piece or parcel at Cataraugos [Cattaraugus Reservation, Fetid Banks], beginning at the mouth of the Eighteen mile or Koghquaugu creek, thence a line or line to be drawn parallel to lake Erie, at the distance of one mile from there, to the mouth of Cataraugos creek, thence a line or lines extending 12 miles up the north side of said creek at the distance of one mile therefrom, thence a direct line to the said creek, thence down the said creek to lake Erie, thence along the lake to the first mentioned creek, and thence to the place of beginning.

Also one other piece at Cataraugos, beginning at the shore of lake Erie, on the south side of Cataraugos creek, at the distance of one mile from the mouth thereof, thence running one mile from the lake, thence on a line parallel thereto, to a point within one mile from the Connondauweyea creek, thence up the said creek one mile, on a line parallel thereto, thence on a direct line to the said creek, thence down the same to lake Erie, thence along the lake to the place of beginning.

Also one other piece or parcel of forty-two square miles, at or near the Allegenny river. [Allegany Indian Reservation]

Also, two hundred square miles, to be laid off partly at the Buffalo and partly at the Tonnawanta creeks [Buffalo Creek Reservation, Tonawanda Reservation Ta'-na-wun-da, Swift Water]. Also, excepting and reserving to them, the said parties of the first part and their heirs, the privilege of fishing and hunting on the said tract of land hereby intended to be conveyed.

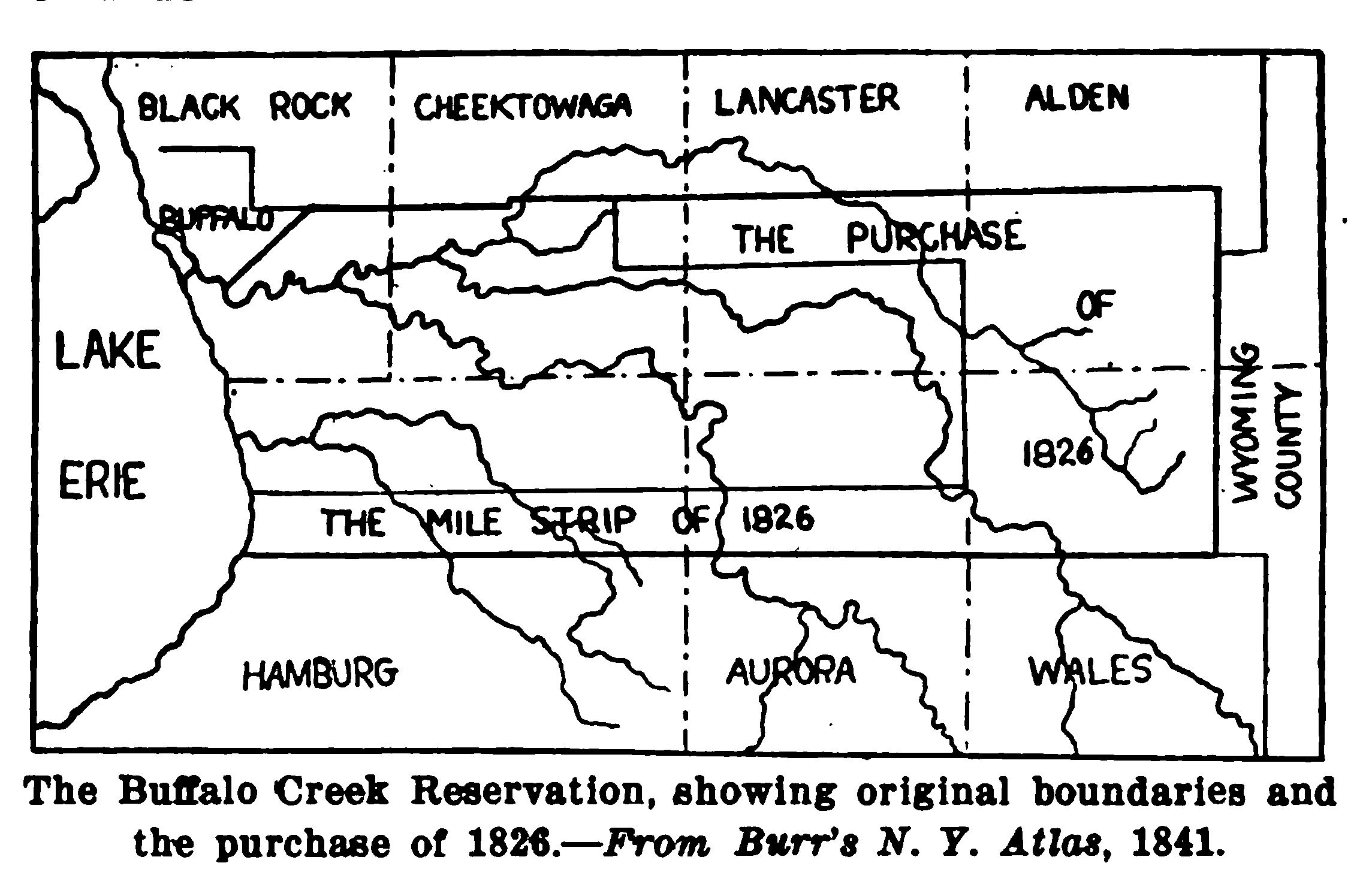
Buffalo Creek Reservation as of 1826 showing original survey and later changes

The treaty left the exact location and sizes of the Buffalo Creek and Tonawanda Creek reservations undefined. In October, 1798, Augustus Porter, acting on behalf of Joseph Ellicott and the Holland Land Company, conducted a survey of the area. He fixed the boundaries and defined the extent of the Buffalo Creek Reservation at 83,557 acres (33,814 ha). In the course of the survey he caused the northwest corner of the tract to be bent so that the mouth of Buffalo Creek would be outside the reservation.

Absent from the treaty was the Oil Spring Reservation near Cuba Lake. In 1861, the Senecas won a lawsuit granting the Seneca Nation of Indians sovereignty over the reservation under the premise that the omission of Oil Spring was a mistake.

== See also ==
- Treaty of Fort Stanwix (1784)
- Treaty of Canandaigua
- Treaties of Buffalo Creek
- Six Nations land cessions

== Sources ==
- Livingston County Historical Society (1897). A history of the treaty of Big Tree. Livingston County historical society.
- "Red Jacket; Iroquois Diplomat and Orator", by Christopher Densmore, Syracuse University Press, 1999
- "Robert Morris and the Treaty of Big Tree", by Norman B. Wilkinson, Organization of American Historians, 1953
- "The Wadsworths of the Genesee", by Alden Hatch, Goward-McCann, Inc., New York 1959
- Laurence M. Hauptman, Conspiracy of Interests: Iroquois Dispossession and the Rise of New York State (2001).
