= Leicester station (New York) =

Coordinates: 42.771426°N 77.897116°W

LEICESTER
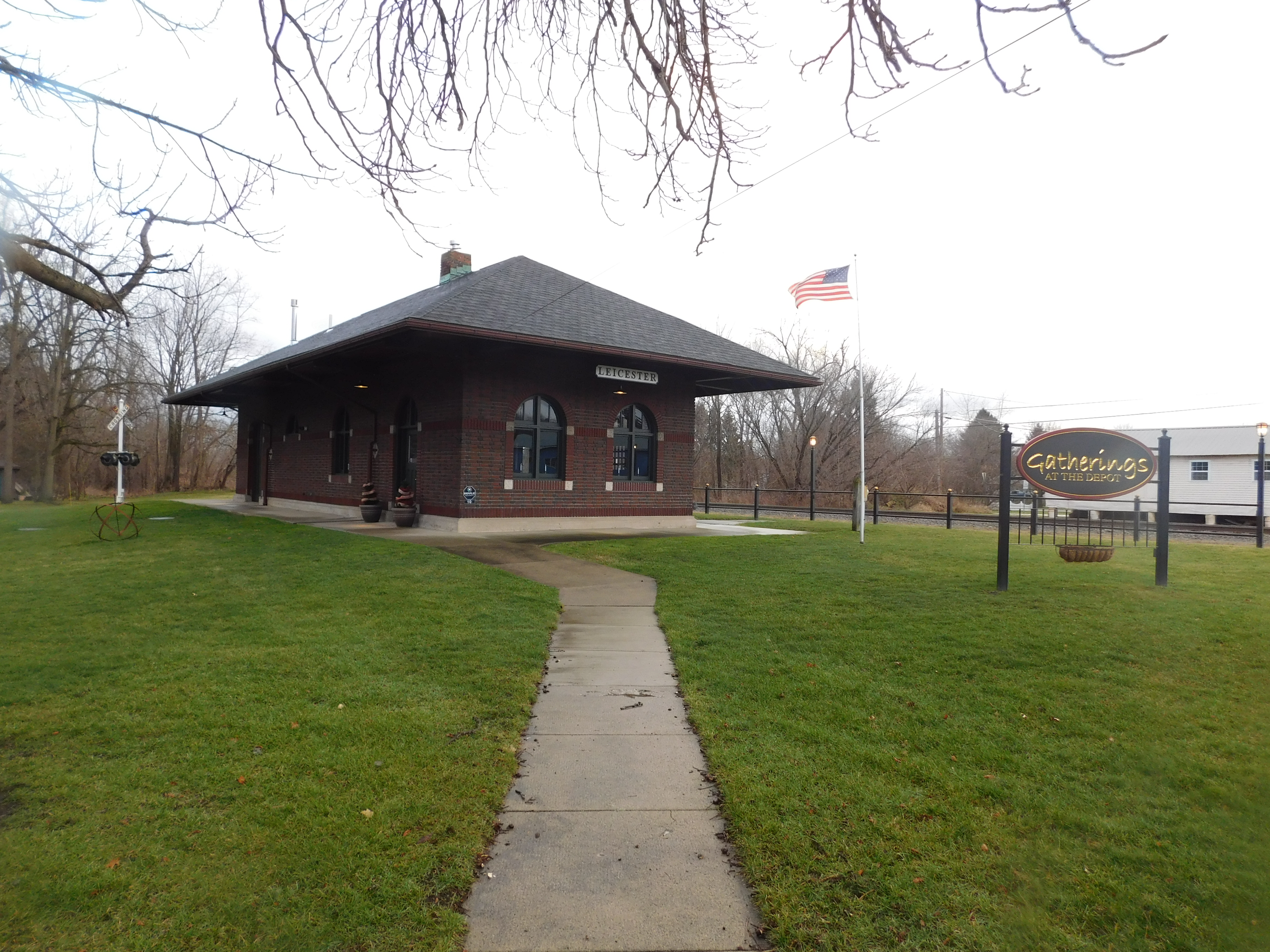
- Leicester station in January 2016

General information
- Location: South Park Drive, Leicester, Livingston County, New York 14481

Former services
Preceding station	Delaware, Lackawanna and Western Railroad	Following station
Buffalo Terminus	Main Line	Painted Post toward Hoboken
Greigsville toward Buffalo	Main Line	P.R.R. Junction toward Hoboken
- Delaware, Lackawanna & Western Railroad Station
- U.S. National Register of Historic Places
- Location within New York
- Location: South Park Dr., Leicester, New York
- Area: 1 acre (0.40 ha)
- Built: 1915
- Architect: Reynolds, F.A.
- Architectural style: Bungalow/Craftsman
- NRHP reference No.: 05001390
- Added to NRHP: December 07, 2005
Location

Leicester station is a historic railway station located at Leicester, New York in Livingston County, New York. It is a 1-story, two-by-four-bay brick building surmounted by a hipped roof with broad overhanging eaves. It was built in 1915 in the Arts and Crafts style.

It was listed on the National Register of Historic Places in 2005 as the Delaware, Lackawanna & Western Railroad Station.
