= Coverdale Cobblestone House =

Historic house in New York, United States

- U.S. National Register of Historic Places
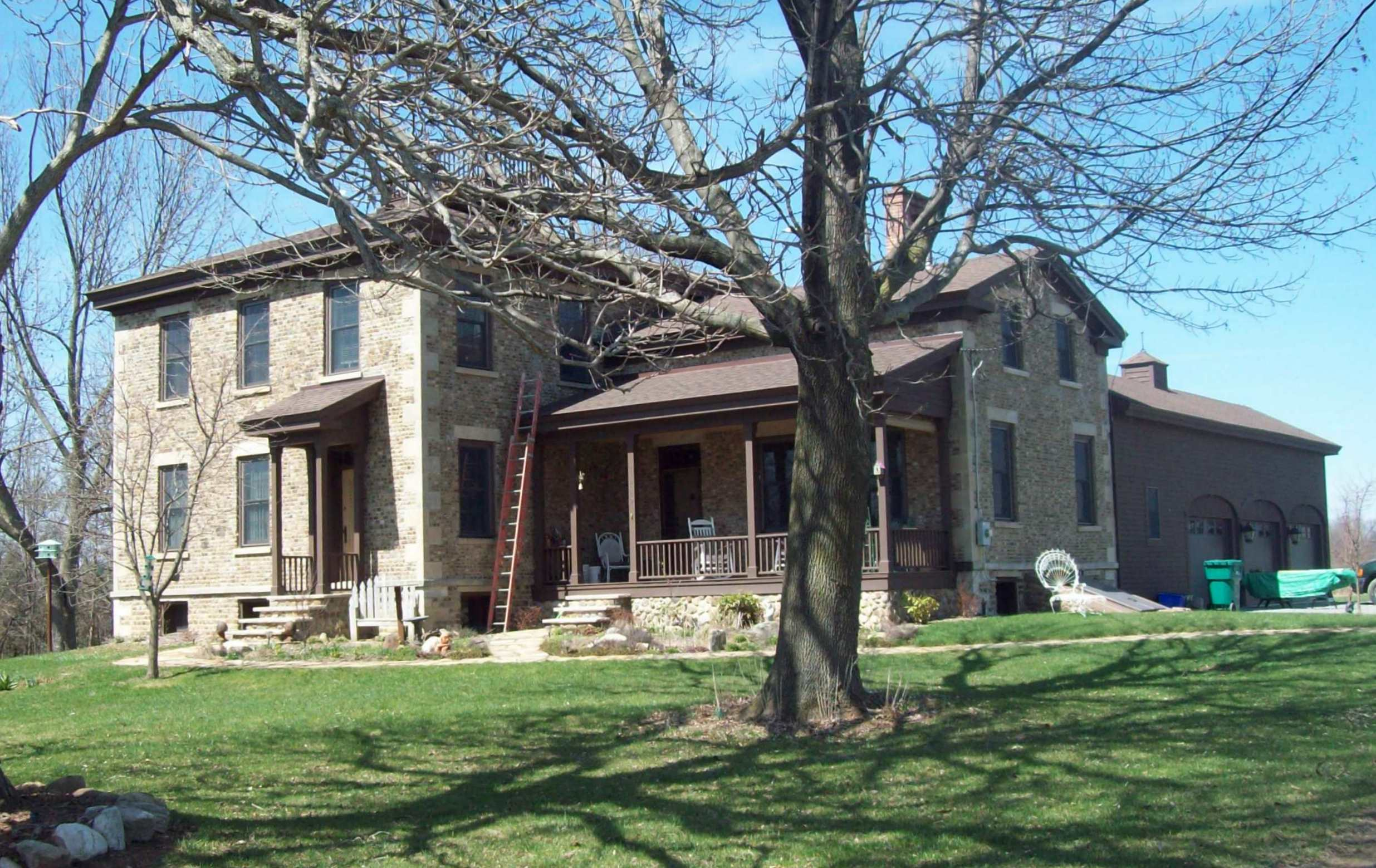
- Coverdale Cobblestone House, April 2011

- Location within New York Location within the United States
- Location: 2049 Coverdale Rd., Leicester, New York
- Coordinates: 42°47′4″N 77°55′51″W
- Area: 13.7 acres (5.5 ha)
- Architectural style: Federal, Greek Revival
- MPS: Cobblestone Architecture of New York State MPS
- NRHP reference No.: 05000989
- Added to NRHP: September 7, 2005

Coverdale Cobblestone House is a historic home located at Leicester in Livingston County, New York. It was completed in 1837 and has a 2-story, three-by-four-bay cobblestone main block, a 1 1/2-story kitchen wing, and a 1-story cobblestone and frame carriage shed. It was built in the late Federal / early Greek Revival style. It features medium-sized cobbles in its construction.

The house underwent restoration between December 2005 and February 2010. The mortar has been refinished, new thermal insulated windows, rebuilt carriage house, inside re-plastered, refinished plank wooden floors, and new front porch. A new Crown Steam Boiler was installed in November 2009. A new concrete basement floor was poured 4–6 inches thick; twin Roth 275 fuel oil tanks installed November 2010; a widow's walk was installed in summer of 2010.

It was listed on the National Register of Historic Places in 2005.
