= Captain Pollard =

Seneca leader

Ga-on-do-wau-na (died 1841) (Big Tree), known as Captain Pollard among other variants, was a leader of the Seneca people.

Pollard's father was an English trader, whose headquarters appear to have been at Fort Niagara, and his mother was Seneca. His stepmother was Catherine Montour. As a young man, he participated in the American Revolutionary War and was present at the Battle of Wyoming. He converted to Christianity as a result of the Seneca mission.

Pollard was selected by the Seneca as a war captain at the beginning of the War of 1812, and was commissioned as a lieutenant in July 1813. Some sources place him at the Battle of Chippawa. He was a signatory of the Treaty of Big Tree; Thomas Morris gave him an annuity around the time the treaty was signed, presumably as inducement. He died on April 10, 1841, and was buried in the mission cemetery at Buffalo Creek Reservation.

== Sources ==
- Benn, Carl (1998). The Iroquois in the War of 1812. University of Toronto Press. ISBN 978-1-4426-8151-4. OCLC 244768670.
- Hauptman, Laurence M. (1999). Conspiracy of Interests: Iroquois Dispossession and the Rise of New York State. Syracuse University Press. ISBN 0-585-24811-7. OCLC 45731442.
- Johnson, Crisfield (1876). Centennial History of Erie County, New York. Buffalo, New York: Matthews & Warren. OCLC 1041776505.
