= National Hotel (Cuylerville, New York) =

- U.S. National Register of Historic Places
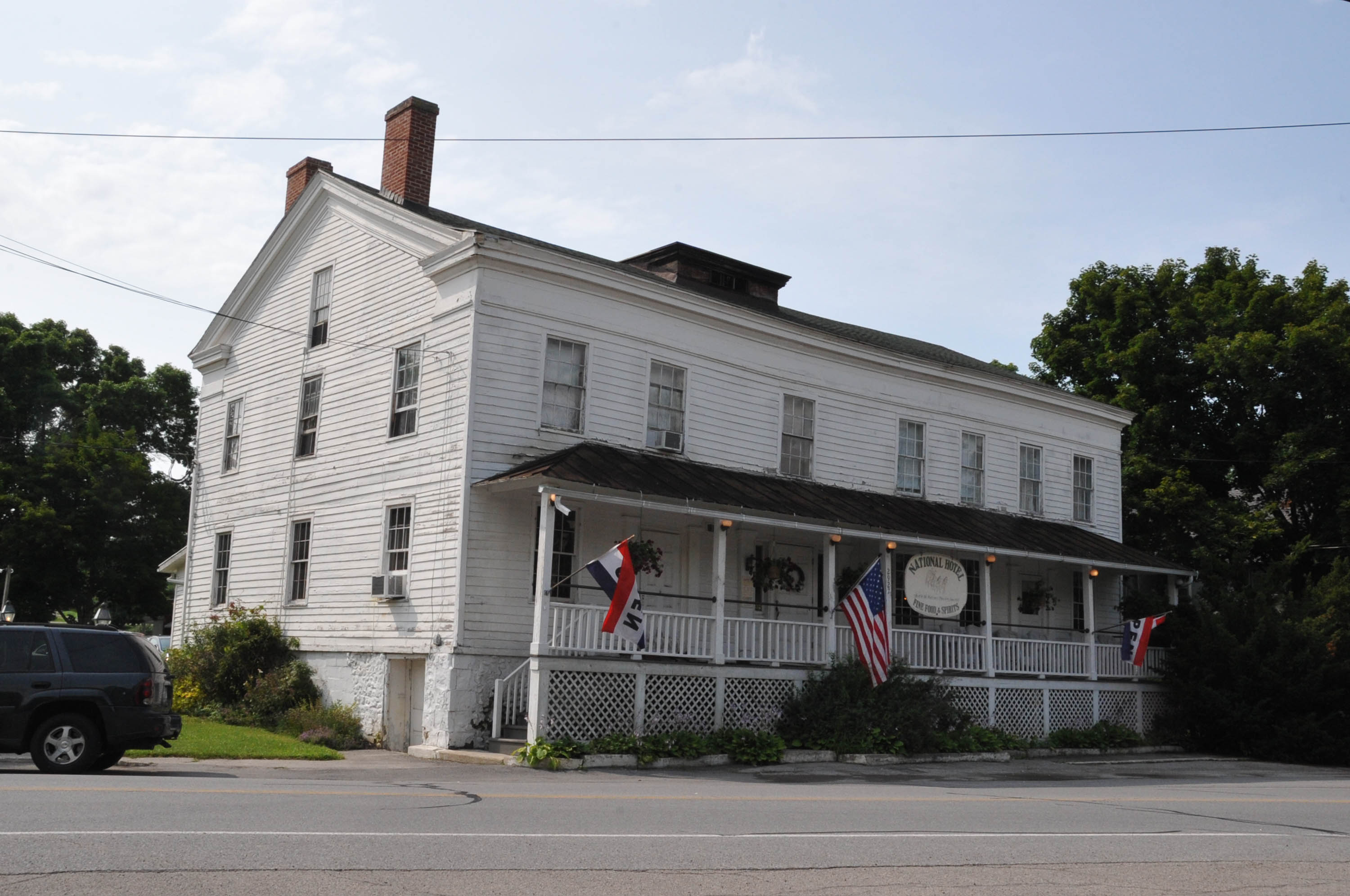

- Location within New York Location within the United States
- Location: 2927 Main St., Cuylerville, New York
- Coordinates: 42°46′40″N 77°52′18″W
- Area: 0.3 acres (0.12 ha)
- Architectural style: Federal, Greek Revival
- NRHP reference No.: 04001344
- Added to NRHP: December 06, 2004

National Hotel is a historic hotel located at Cuylerville in Livingston County, New York. It is a large 2-story, seven-by-three-bay Federal / Greek Revival–style frame structure. It was built in 1841 and was reputedly a station on the Underground Railroad.

It was listed on the National Register of Historic Places in 2004.
