= Daniel O. Mahoney =

American politician (1854–1944

Member of the Wisconsin State Assembly from the Vernon County district
- In office January 2, 1893 – January 4, 1897
- Preceded by: District established
- Succeeded by: Emilus Goodell

Personal details
- Born: June 8, 1854 Moscow, New York, U.S.
- Died: September 21, 1944 (aged 90) La Crosse, Wisconsin, U.S.
- Resting place: Viroqua Cemetery, Viroqua, Wisconsin
- Party: Republican
- Spouse: May E. Welsh (m. 1883; died 1926)
- Children: Emmett P. Mahoney^{(b. 1885; died 1934)}; Nell M. Mahoney^{(b. 1887; died 1964)}; Phoebe Gross (Schelling)^{(b. 1891; died 1970)}
- Profession: Lawyer

Daniel O. Mahoney (June 8, 1854 – September 21, 1944) was an American lawyer, judge, and Republican politician from Viroqua, Wisconsin. He served two terms in the Wisconsin State Assembly, representing Vernon County in the 1893 and 1895 terms. Later, he served as a county judge.

== Biography ==
Mahoney was born on June 8, 1854, in Moscow, New York. He died on September 21, 1944.

== Career ==
Mahoney was a member of the Assembly during the 1893 and 1895 sessions. Other positions he held include County Superintendent of Vernon County, Wisconsin. He was a Republican.

He ran for U.S. House of Representatives in Wisconsin's 3rd congressional district in 1908, but lost in the Republican primary to Arthur W. Kopp.
