= Asher Wright =

American Presbyterian missionary

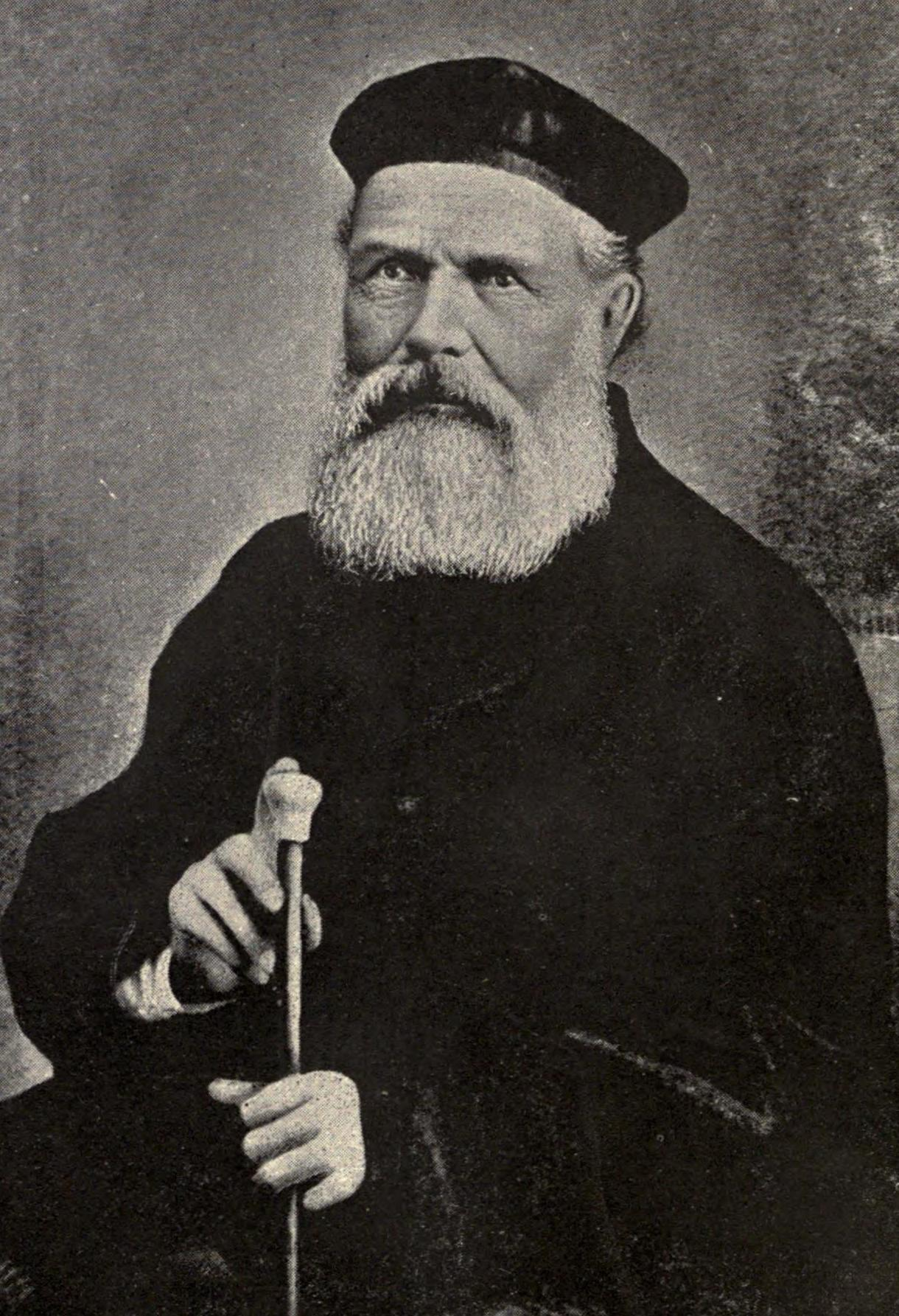
- Born: September 7, 1803; Hanover, New Hampshire, United States
- Died: April 13, 1875 (aged 71); Cattaraugus, New York, United States
- Burial place: United Missions Cemetery, Erie County, New York, United States
- Spouse: Martha Edgerton (m. 1831; died 1832) Laura Maria Sheldon (m. 1833–1875)

Asher Wright (September 7, 1803 – April 13, 1875) was an American Friends (Quaker) missionary, who worked among the people of the Seneca Nation, of the native Iroquois of the northeastern United States from 1831 to 1875. His most notable work was the extensive translation and linguistics work he did among the Seneca people. Asher and his wife Laura Maria Sheldon were based in the Seneca mission on the Buffalo Creek Reservation. After 1845, they relocated along with the Buffalo Creek Seneca to the Cattaraugus Reservation following the sale of Buffalo Creek to developers from the Ogden Company. Alongside their missionary and ministry work, the Wrights recorded the Seneca language and culture. Integral to their work was the education of the Seneca people, especially teaching literacy to the people in their own language. In 1855 they founded the Thomas Asylum for Orphan and Destitute Children, later named the Thomas Indian School.

== Early life and education ==
Wright was born in Hanover, New Hampshire, on September 7, 1803. He was educated at Dartmouth College between 1826 and 1829, registered in the medical school alongside studying Ancient Languages. At the same time, Wright was enrolled at the Andover Theological Seminary, where he graduated in 1831 and was ordained in the same year. Prior to his appointment as a missionary at Buffalo Creek Reservation, Wright married Martha Edgerton in 1831. Martha died on January 7, 1831, from illness and ongoing poor health, aged 23. On January 21, 1833, Wright married Laura Maria Sheldon, a school teacher from Vermont, whom he had corresponded with through letter after being introduced to by their mutual friend Rev. Clark Perry.

== Missionary work ==
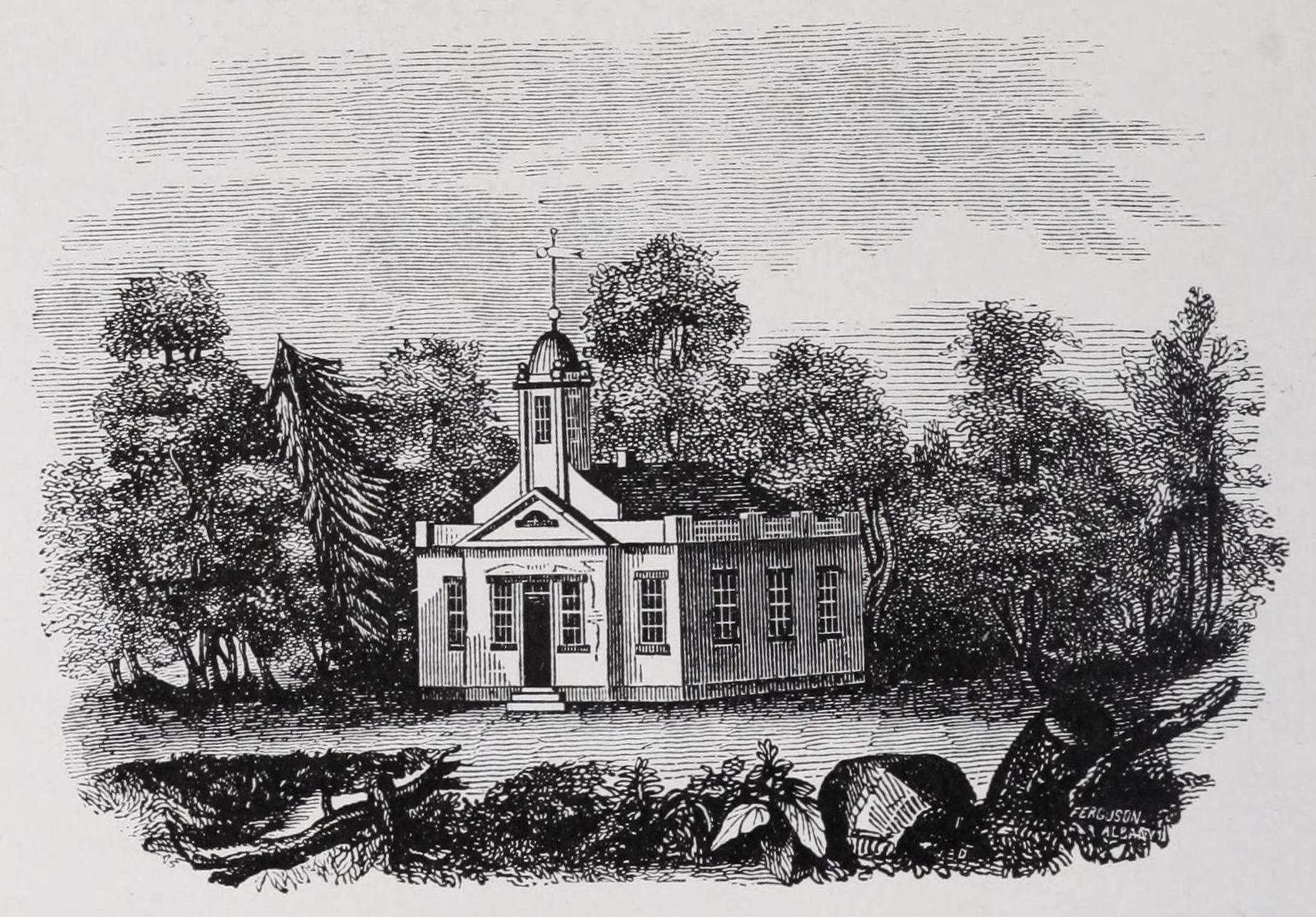
The Seneca Mission Church at the Buffalo Creek Reservation

=== Linguistics and anthropological work ===
Wright's missionary work began in 1831 after graduating seminary, moving to Buffalo Creek to work among the Seneca people. The Mission at Buffalo Creek had been established in 1811, 20 years prior to Wright's commencement there, where translation work had already been started on hymns, the Gospel of Luke and other portions of the Bible.

In 1842, Wright published A Spelling Book in the Seneca Language With English Definitions, a work which compiled Wright's linguistic efforts in developing a Seneca alphabet, work which involved self-devised phonetic systems and other linguistic methods. Using knowledge of the Seneca language, Wright translated sections of the Bible to provide resources for himself and Laura to run education programs among the Seneca people. These translations of the bible assisted their ministry work. Laura in particular used the linguistic development to create bilingual schoolbooks and resources, starting with a primer in 1836, a spelling book in 1842 and a journal between 1841 and 1850. The creation of these resources, apart from the primer, were the benefit of a specialised printing press established in the Seneca mission by Wright. The journal, titled the Mental Elevator, was also edited by the Wrights, and was a part of their wider collection of translation work including the Gospels, dictionaries, hymnals, primers, spelling books and tracts.

Throughout 1874, Wright sent several letters containing his observations, specifically focusing on social organisation and ceremony within Seneca clans, to the anthropologist Lewis Henry Morgan in response to a request for data to aid in research for his book, Ancient Society.

It is suggested that Wright, along with the assistance of Laura, provided medical assistance to the people of the reservation, using the knowledge he acquired from his time at Dartmouth College. The two were supposedly widely sought on the reservation, and would provide medical attention, caring for people both spiritually and physically in their role as missionaries on the reservation.

=== Removal of the Seneca from Buffalo Creek ===
In 1838 the Treaty of Buffalo Creek was signed, which decreed that the four Seneca reservations would be sold off to the Ogden Land Company and intended for the Seneca people to be removed to Kansas. Wright was among many who considered the proceedings surrounding the treaty corrupt, along with the majority of the community at Buffalo Creek, due to the bribery of Seneca Chiefs by the land developers. Wright corresponded with a Quaker committee who were acting against the treaty and provided letters and witnessed testimonials opposing the treaty. As a part of this, he contributed a letter to be included in The Case of the Seneca Indians (1840), a publication by the Quakers appealing against the terms of the treaty. While the opposition to the treaty led to a compromise treaty being drafted and signed in 1842, the opponents were unable to reclaim Seneca ownership to the Buffalo Creek Reservation. The result of this treaty saw the majority of the Seneca of Buffalo Creek relocate to the Cattaraugus Reservation, a Seneca reservation that had been returned to the people as a part of the compromise treaty.

The Wrights relocated to the Cattaraugus Reservation along with the majority of the Buffalo Creek Seneca, where the Seneca Church was reestablished in 1845.

The impact of the treaties and relocations was considered a setback of missionary work by Wright. He wrote about the increased hostility to Christianity after the removal to Cattaraugus.

The pagan portion of the two Reservations availed themselves of the opportunity of union to build up and strengthen their cause against Christianity... The influence of Christianity had been almost paralyzed by the intense excitement of the popular mind during the treaty struggle; there was alienation between brethren, bitter enmity among neighbors and kindred, and thorough scorn of the Christian profession among pagans and impenitent sinners.

=== Thomas Asylum for Orphan and Destitute Children ===
In September 1847, the Seneca suffered an epidemic of typhoid, in which approximately 70 of them died. The Wrights began taking in the orphaned children left behind by the outbreak. By 1854, the number of orphans and destitute children in the reserve had exceeded fifty. Due to the lack of any charitable institution to assist with this, the Wrights appealed to the Society of Friends, the New York State Legislature, and businessman Philip E. Thomas in order to fund the establishment of an orphanage. Thomas had previously voiced his support of the Seneca cause after the Wright and the Quakers had helped the Seneca people retain some of their land in the compromise treaty. Thomas' name was used for the Asylum due to his financial support towards its cause.

After Wright had appealed to the legislature in Albany, a charter to establish an institution was passed in 1855 and the Thomas Asylum for Orphan and Destitute Children was founded with the Wrights taking on the position of co-directors. Building of the facility started in September 1855, and by the summer of 1866, the facility was ready to be occupied. The institution had the capacity to house 100 children, and a schoolhouse was soon built on the property where 'these children received the advantages of a district school." Wright held the position of director until his death in 1875. In the same year, control of the asylum passed to the State Board of Charities due to financial difficulties.

== Response and legacy ==
=== Opposition ===
Wright's missionary work underwent opposition, especially in response to his activity surrounding negotiating the treaties and the relocation to Cattaraugus. This opposition, for the most part, came from groups within the Seneca community.

The Seneca tribe underwent a political revolution of sorts, changing the governing powers of the nation to an elected council rather than a hereditary council of chiefs. Wright's influence into the changing political structures of the Seneca tribes brought opposition from their members. It has been suggested that missionaries such as Wright "were at times greater defenders of Seneca land rights than were some of the Senecas themselves." His translation of the constitution and suggestions for articles in the constitution were strongly opposed by the Chiefs of the old hereditary system, who both petitioned Wright's superiors for his removal due to the perceived abuse of his role, and also threatened the status of missionaries among the community. This opposition also had a significant impact on his congregation, as the political division was not extensively religious, although it found reason to blame both Pagan and Christian sections of the community. As such, some of those from the old system who were opposed to Wright were those who were a part of his congregation, where the church was divided into opposing factions because of this issue.

The removal from Buffalo Creek saw resentment toward Christianity and the missionaries arise among the community, a majority of whom saw the removal from their ancestral land as the fault of Christianity. Even more so, Christian chiefs who were a part of the signing of the initial treaty were discovered to have been bribed by the company, furthering the resentment of Christianity among the community and the influence of the missionaries on their way of life. The words of former Seneca leader Red Jacket were taken on by the people, where it is recorded that they said "that if we took the religion of the pale face, we should lose our homes. His words were true." The result of this was that they believed that "this new religion (Christianity)... must be bad, since those who embraced it could be so dishonest, so unjust, so cruel."

The impeding opposition to Wright's mission during these trials was considered a hindrance to the work of mission by Wright. The minimal growth that he saw in the church and the periods of decline during the time of opposition has even lead to the suggestion that Wright considered his mission in terms of seeing converts made of the Seneca a failure.

=== Legacy ===
Wright's work as a linguist among the Seneca saw the language develop from a spoken language to a language of literacy. His work is still used as a basis for Seneca translation and written work, and has still been considered the best source on the Seneca language. Alongside this, Wright has been viewed in his life as serving "as an educator, key advisor, scribe, important conduit between the Indians and the white establishment, and even as a determined champion of Seneca Indians and their lands."

In most scholarly opinions of his missionary work, Wright is viewed favourably for his cultural sensitivity and observance. Thomas Abler remarks on Wright's fascination and regard for culture, as differing from the conventional anthropological "view of missionaries as disruptive agents of cultural change," but rather being an example of a missionary who didn't 'carry extreme ethnocentrism as part of their cultural baggage.' Likewise, Alister McGrath comments on the legacy of both Wright's ministry and other work, suggesting in his book Christian History: An Introduction that Wright's "missionary work was not especially successful; however, his commitment to the people and knowledge of their language and customs led to the preservation of their distinctive features." He notes that Wright's example assists in questioning the stereotype of western missionaries being colonial in intention.

The United Missions Church on the Cattaraugus Reservation where Wright ministered was renamed the Wright Memorial Church in 1957, in remembrance of Asher and Laura Wright and their missionary work among the Seneca people.

== See also ==
- Bible translations into Native American languages
