= Horatio Jones (pioneer) =

Soldier in the American Revolution

Horatio Jones (1763–1836) was a soldier in the American Revolution and an early European-American settler in the Genesee Valley of Western New York.

Jones was born in Chester County, Pennsylvania on February 7, 1763. As a child he moved to Bedford County, Pennsylvania. At age 16 he joined a militia unit, the "Bedford Rangers." In 1779 the company was ambushed by Seneca Indians, and Jones was captured and taken to Caneadea, New York. He was adopted into a Seneca family and became fluent in the language. During the remainder of the war he is said to have been instrumental in helping to rescue others taken prisoner by the Seneca, including Major Moses Van Campen.

After the war, George Washington appointed Jones agent and interpreter for the Six Nations. In this capacity he served as interpreter at the negotiations for the Treaty of Canandaigua in 1794 and the Treaty of Big Tree in 1797.

In 1784 Jones married Sarah Whitmoyer (or Whitmore) from Schenectady, also a former Seneca captive. They established a trading post in Waterloo, New York, then called Schanves, where their eldest son, Colonel William W. Jones, was born.

In spring 1790 the Joneses moved to the Genesee Valley, settling near Beard's Creek in what is now the town of Leicester. In 1791, Jones officially purchased the lot of land in Geneseo on which his homestead, Sweet Briar, was constructed. Sarah W. Jones died in 1794, and Horatio Jones married Elizabeth Starr from Groveland, New York in 1795. He died in Geneseo 1836. He is buried in Temple Hill Cemetery in Geneseo. Elizabeth died in 1844 and is buried in Temple Hill Cemetery.
