= Jasper Parrish =

American interpreter and diplomat (1767–1836)

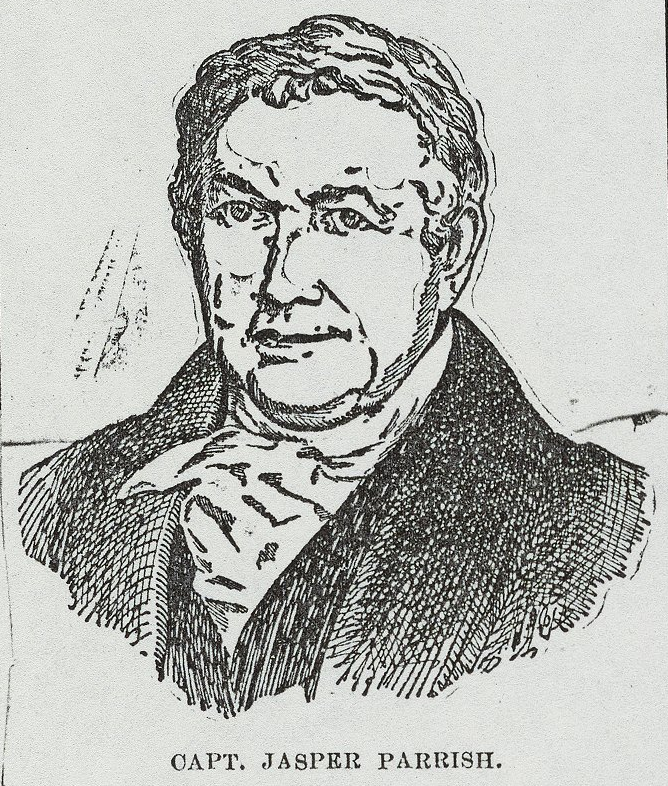
Jasper Parrish

Jasper Parrish (9 March 1767 – 12 July 1836) was a United States Agent and Interpreter for the Iroquois. Parrish was fluent in the Mohawk and Delaware languages after having lived among the Munsee and Mohawk nations for six years as a child. Parrish's residence with the Indian nations began when he and his father were kidnapped by members of the Munsee Indian nation on July 5, 1778.

== Captivity and a new family ==
At the age of eleven, Jasper and his Father, Zebulon Parrish, were kidnapped by the Munsee in southern New York. He was separated from his father, who was returned to the family in a prisoner of war exchange. Jasper remained with the Indians for seven years. In 1780, Jasper was sold to David Hill (Karonghyontye), a Mohawk chief, and formally adopted by his family. In 1784, at the conclusion of the American Revolutionary War and after a surrender at Fort Stanwix, he was given the choice to remain with the Hill family or return to his own. He chose to return to his own family. Although he was fluent in the Delaware and Mohawk languages, he had lost his knowledge of English.

== Reintegration and a job with the US Government ==
Although Jasper Parrish had lost his fluency in English, after he returned to his birth family, he also returned to school for a year and then studied extensively on his own. In 1790 he was asked to serve as an interpreter for the newly formed US Government. In 1792 he relocated to Canandaigua and worked under General Israel Chapin who was Superintendent of the Six Nations. The Six Nations of the Iroquois Confederacy consisted of the Mohawk (with whom Jasper Parrish had known family relationships), the Oneida, the Cayuga, the Seneca, the Onondaga, and the Tuscarora.

== Interpreter and Sub Agent ==
Parrish worked for the US Government for almost thirty years. He was involved in the negotiation of treaties and the securing of wampum for the Iroquois. He provided interpretation for The Pickering Treaty, signed at Canandaigua of 1794. This treaty resulted in peace between the Iroquois and the US Government as it gave the Six Nations ownership of their land. Members of the Iroquois were still receiving payment based on this treaty as late as 1941.

== Appreciation expressed by the Iroquois ==
Japser Parrish and Horatio Jones, another interpreter, were so appreciated for their services and themselves by the Iroquois, that in 1798 they were given large land grants from the Six Nations. The words of a leader, Farmer's Brother, convey the appreciation they felt. An excerpt is provided below.

You will recollect the late contest between you and your father, the great King of England. This contest threw the inhabitants of this whole island into a great tumult and commotion, like a raging whirlwind which tears up the trees, and tosses to and fro the leaves so that no one knows from whence they come, or where they will fall.—This whirlwind was so directed by the Great Spirit above as to throw into our arms two of your infant children, Jasper Parrish and Horatio Jones. We adopted them into our families, and made them our children. We loved then, and nourished them. They lived with us many years. At length the Great Spirit spoke to the whirlwind and it was still. A clear and uninterrupted sky appeared. The path of peace was opened, and the chain of friendship was once more made bright. Then these, our adopted children, left us to seek their relations; we wished them to remain among us, and promised if they would return and live in our country. to give each of them a seat of land for them and their children to sit down upon. They have returned and have, for several years past, been serviceable to us as interpreters. We still feel our hearts beat with affection for them, and now wish to fulfill the promise we made them, and reward them for their services.

== Parrish family ==
Jasper Parish married Roxalina Paine in 1783. She was the daughter of General Edward Paine. His great-great-granddaughter, Antoinette Parrish (Hough) Martin, who published under the name of "Nettie Parrish Martin", captured stories from the time of the Iroquois Nation in a book named Indian Legends of Early Days. In the forward for her book, Martin notes:

Jasper Parrish, (a grandsire) was a missionary and trader among the six tribes, and during this sojourn among them he so endeared himself to all, they named him Sen-ne-oc-ta-wa, meaning "Good Man", and ever after his descendents had only to say that name and every care and kindness was cheerfully given them that the Indians were able to bestow.

== Parrish Legacy ==
The Buffalo Municipal Public Housing Authority Jasper Parrish Development commences at Jasper Parish Drive and Hertel Avenue in Buffalo, New York and extends to Lawn Avenue on the north and Military Road on the west.
