= Boyd & Parker Park and Groveland Ambuscade =

- U.S. National Register of Historic Places
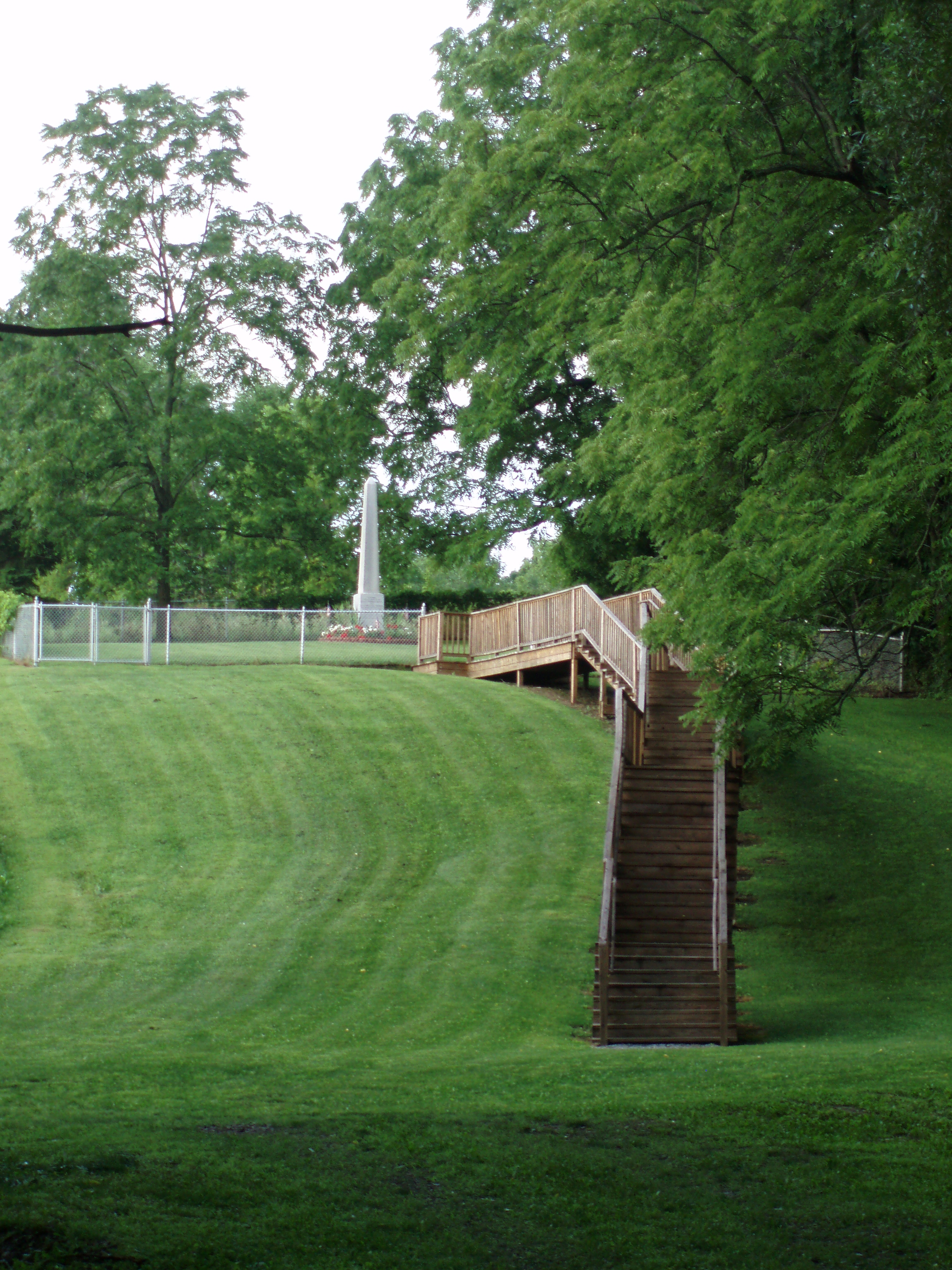

- Location within New York Location within the United States
- Location: US 20A; Gray Hill Road, Groveland, New York
- Coordinates: 42°46′33.996″N 77°51′39.9954″W
- Area: 69.7 acres (28.2 ha) and 3 acres (1.2 ha)
- NRHP reference No.: 07000757
- Added to NRHP: October 1, 2009

Boyd & Parker Park and Groveland Ambuscade is a historic park area located near the Town of Groveland in Livingston County, New York. The site commemorates the Boyd and Parker ambush, which took place during the Sullivan Expedition of the American Revolutionary War of September 1779.

The site was listed on the National Register of Historic Places in 2009.
