= Leicester (village), New York =

Leicester, New York
- Village
- Location within New York Location within the United States
- Coordinates: 42°46′17″N 77°53′45″W
- Country: United States
- State: New York
- County: Livingston
- Town: Leicester

Area
  - Total: 0.36 sq mi (0.93 km^{2})
  - Land: 0.36 sq mi (0.93 km^{2})
  - Water: 0 sq mi (0.00 km^{2})
- Elevation: 650 ft (198 m)

Population (2020)
  - Total: 440
  - Density: 1,219.4/sq mi (470.81/km^{2})
- Time zone: UTC-5 (Eastern (EST))
  - Summer (DST): UTC-4 (EDT)
- ZIP code: 14481
- Area code: 585
- FIPS code: 36-41872
- GNIS feature ID: 2390938
- Website: www.villageofleicester.org

Leicester is a village in the town of Leicester, Livingston County, New York, United States. The population was 468 at the 2010 census, out of 2,200 in the entire town of Leicester. The village and town are named after Leicester Phelps, an early inhabitant.

== History ==
The village was formerly called "Leister" and "Moscow". It was incorporated in 1850. In 1917 settlement was renamed to "Leicester" due to political reasons.

The Delaware, Lackawanna & Western Railroad Station was added to the National Register of Historic Places in 2005.

== Notable people ==
- Daniel O. Mahoney, former Wisconsin State Assemblyman
- George W. Patterson, former US congressman and lieutenant governor of New York
- Eben Norton Horsford, former baking powder magnate.

== Geography ==
The village is in western Livingston County, in the center of the town of Leicester. According to the United States Census Bureau, the village has a total area of 0.35 square miles (0.9 km^{2}), all land. The northern border of the village is Beards Creek, an east-flowing tributary of the Genesee River.

The village is at the junction of U.S. Route 20A, New York State Route 36, and New York State Route 39. It is 5 miles (8 km) west of Geneseo, the Livingston county seat, and 34 miles (55 km) southwest of Rochester.

The village is 3 miles (5 km) north of Mount Morris Dam at the north end of Letchworth State Park.

== Demographics ==
Historical population
Census	Pop.	Note	%±
1910	304		—
1920	279		−8.2%
1930	285		2.2%
1940	327		14.7%
1950	364		11.3%
1960	365		0.3%
1970	368		0.8%
1980	462		25.5%
1990	405		−12.3%
2000	469		15.8%
2010	468		−0.2%
2020	440		−6.0%
U.S. Decennial Census

As of the census of 2000, there were 469 people, 175 households, and 130 families residing in the village. The population density was 1,317.8 inhabitants per square mile (508.8/km^{2}). There were 186 housing units at an average density of 522.6 per square mile (201.8/km^{2}). The racial makeup of the village was 95.74% White, 0.43% Black or African American, 0.21% Native American, 1.49% from other races, and 2.13% from two or more races. Hispanic or Latino of any race were 2.35% of the population.

There were 175 households, out of which 35.4% had children under the age of 18 living with them, 57.7% were married couples living together, 10.9% had a female householder with no husband present, and 25.7% were non-families. 21.1% of all households were made up of individuals, and 8.6% had someone living alone who was 65 years of age or older. The average household size was 2.53 and the average family size was 2.90.

In the village, the population was spread out, with 23.9% under the age of 18, 5.3% from 18 to 24, 29.2% from 25 to 44, 23.9% from 45 to 64, and 17.7% who were 65 years of age or older. The median age was 40 years. For every 100 females, there were 107.5 males. For every 100 females age 18 and over, there were 110.0 males.

The median income for a household in the village was $43,750, and the median income for a family was $55,357. Males had a median income of $33,750 versus $27,386 for females. The per capita income for the village was $18,752. About 6.4% of families and 13.1% of the population were below the poverty line, including 24.5% of those under age 18 and 6.5% of those age 65 or over.
