= Young King (Seneca chief) =

Young King (c. 1760–1835) or Koyengquahtah was a Hoyaneh of the Seneca nation. He was born in the village of Canandaigua, Seneca nation in about 1760. He was a nephew of Sayenqueraghta (also known as Old Smoke or Old King), who was the war leader of the Seneca at the Battle of Wyoming. Young King grew to adulthood during the tumultuous time of the American War of Independence, and fled to Fort Niagara with his mother during the Sullivan Campaign. He was later elected war chief and was a renowned warrior, a wise counsellor and was possessed of high social qualities among his own people and the Americans.

He was a delegate to and a reluctant signatory of the Treaty of Big Tree on September 15, 1797. The treaty was delayed, as his people would not commit to the treaty until Young King arrived. He apparently was at the funerals of a friend and a cousin and had been delayed. He originally refused the terms of the treaty but was convinced by the clan mothers and others to accept the treaty.

During the War of 1812, together with the other Senecas, he supported the United States, and was seriously wounded in one battle.

Young King moved to the reservation at Buffalo Creek, where he took to drinking and dissipation. He was seriously wounded in a brawl, losing an arm. He eventually stopped and became a converted Christian. He died on the reservation in 1835. He was initially buried in the Old Mission Cemetery on the reservation, but his remains were later relocated to Buffalo's Forest Lawn Cemetery in 1884.
