= Leicester, New York =

- Town
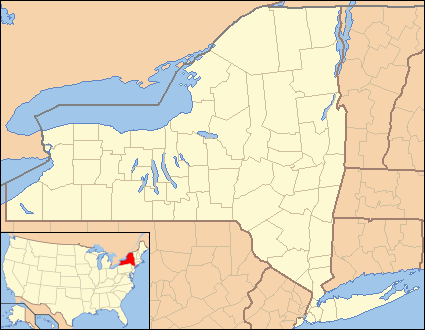
- Location within the state of New York
- Coordinates: 42°46′17″N 077°53′45″W
- Country: United States
- State: New York
- County: Livingston

Government
  - Type: Town Council
  - Town Supervisor: Gary D. Moore (D, R)
  - Town Council: Members' List: • Richard Hamilton (R); • Debra Logsdon (D); • Terrance S. Grant (R); • Gerald W. Hull (R)

Area
  - Total: 33.93 sq mi (87.89 km^{2})
  - Land: 33.93 sq mi (87.88 km^{2})
  - Water: 0.0039 sq mi (0.01 km^{2})

Population (2010)
  - Total: 2,200
  - Estimate (2016): 2,139
  - Density: 63.0/sq mi (24.34/km^{2})
- Time zone: UTC-5 (Eastern (EST))
  - Summer (DST): UTC-4 (EDT)
- ZIP Codes: 14481 (Leicester); 14510 (Mount Morris); 14530 (Perry); 14533 (Piffard)
- Area code: 585
- FIPS code: 36-051-41883
- Website: www.townofleicesterny.gov

Leicester (/ˈlɛstər/ LEST-ər) is a town in Livingston County, New York, United States. The population was 2,200 at the 2010 census. The town is named after Leicester Phelps, an early inhabitant.

Leicester is on the western border of Livingston County. The village of Leicester is at the center of the town. Leicester is west of Geneseo.

== History ==
The area was a major stronghold of the Seneca people until the American Revolution, with three major villages: Little Beard's Town, Big Tree, and Squakie Hill. These three settlements were a target of the Sullivan Expedition in 1779, to end raids on American communities.

The town was first settled around 1789. The town was formed in 1802, but the name, originally spelled "Lester" or "Leister", was changed in 1805 to the current form. The town was later reduced in size by the creation of newer towns: Mount Morris (1813) and York (1819).

The Coverdale Cobblestone House was added to the National Register of Historic Places in 2005.

== Geography ==
According to the United States Census Bureau, the town has a total area of 33.9 square miles (87.9 km^{2}), of which 0.004 square miles (0.01 km^{2}), or 0.01%, are water. The Genesee River forms the eastern border of the town, and the west town line is the border of Wyoming County.

The concurrent routes of U.S. 20A and New York State Route 39 form an east-west highway across the town from Pine Tavern to the eastern town line. West of Pine Tavern, US 20A and NY 39 follow separate roadways to the western town line. New York State Route 36 is a north-south highway, intersecting US-20A and NY-39 at Leicester village.

=== Adjacent towns and areas ===
(Clockwise)

- York
- Geneseo
- Mount Morris
- Castile; Perry; Covington

== Demographics ==
Historical population
Census	Pop.	Note	%±
1820	1,331		—
1830	2,042		53.4%
1840	2,415		18.3%
1850	2,142		−11.3%
1860	2,008		−6.3%
1870	1,744		−13.1%
1880	1,670		−4.2%
1890	1,647		−1.4%
1900	1,415		−14.1%
1910	1,702		20.3%
1920	1,686		−0.9%
1930	1,565		−7.2%
1940	1,371		−12.4%
1950	1,350		−1.5%
1960	1,392		3.1%
1970	1,799		29.2%
1980	1,888		4.9%
1990	2,223		17.7%
2000	2,287		2.9%
2010	2,200		−3.8%
2016 (est.)	2,139	▼	−2.8%
U.S. Decennial Census

As of the census of 2000, there were 2,287 people, 849 households, and 640 families residing in the town. The population density was 68.2 inhabitants per square mile (26.3/km^{2}). There were 900 housing units at an average density of 26.8 per square mile (10.3/km^{2}). The racial makeup of the town was 97.86% White, 0.87% Black or African American, 0.09% Native American, 0.04% Asian, 0.48% from other races, and 0.66% from two or more races. Hispanic or Latino of any race were 1.01% of the population.

There were 849 households, out of which 34.9% had children under the age of 18 living with them, 60.3% were married couples living together, 9.5% had a female householder with no husband present, and 24.5% were non-families. 20.0% of all households were made up of individuals, and 8.0% had someone living alone who was 65 years of age or older. The average household size was 2.66 and the average family size was 3.04.

In the town, the population was spread out, with 26.3% under the age of 18, 7.4% from 18 to 24, 29.5% from 25 to 44, 23.6% from 45 to 64, and 13.2% who were 65 years of age or older. The median age was 37 years. For every 100 females, there were 103.8 males. For every 100 females age 18 and over, there were 102.0 males.

The median income for a household in the town was $41,230, and the median income for a family was $46,652. Males had a median income of $35,450 versus $26,420 for females. The per capita income for the town was $17,655. About 4.6% of families and 8.2% of the population were below the poverty line, including 7.3% of those under age 18 and 4.4% of those age 65 or over.

== Education ==
Students who reside in the town of Leicester typically attend York Central School. Students living on the borders of Leicester could also attend the schools of bordering towns including Geneseo, Perry and Mt. Morris.

== Notable person ==
- George W. Patterson, US congressman

== Communities and locations in the town ==
- Beards Creek – A tributary of the Genesee River, named after native leader "Little Beard".
- Big Tree – Former native community and later a reservation partly in the town.
- Cuylerville – A hamlet and census-designated place northeast of Leicester village on Routes 20A and NY-39.
- Gibonville – A former community in the southwest part of the town.
- Leicester – The village of Leicester is centrally located in the town on US-20A at the junction with NY-36.
- Letchworth State Park – A state park at the south town line.
- Little Beard's Town – A former native community located near present-day Cuylerville.
- Pine Tavern Corners or Pine Tavern – A hamlet southwest of Leicester village on Routes 20A and 39.
- Squakie Hill – Former native community and (later) a former reservation at the Genesee River west of NY-36.
- Teed Corners – A hamlet near the north town line on NY-36.

== See also ==
- New York International Raceway Park
