= Henry C. Spencer =

American chemical engineer and executive (1915–1999)

Henry Christian Spencer
- Born: June 24, 1915; Cedar Rapids, Iowa, US
- Died: May 30, 1999 (aged 83); Green Valley, Arizona, US
- Education: Iowa State University
- Spouse(s): Evelyn Burchard (1938-1971); Mary P. Adams (1972-1999)

Henry Christian Spencer (June 24, 1915 – May 30, 1999) was an American businessman and executive at the Kerite Company in Seymour, Connecticut. As secretary and vice president, he was involved in discussions about unions at the company, and in its joining with Hubbell Company.

== Early life and education ==
He was born at St. Luke's Hospital in Cedar Rapids, Iowa the son of Dr. William Henry Spencer and Bertha (Wenig) Spencer. He was named after his mother's brothers Henry and Christian Wenig, and his great-grandparents Henry and Christina (Ohde) Knutz.

His father, William Henry Spencer, attended Tilford Collegiate Academy and graduated from the Illinois College of Physicians and Surgeons, in 1904. After a fellowship at Cook County Hospital, he practiced in Cedar Rapids, with an office in the Granby Building. He was a member of the Odd Fellows, Freemasons, Shriners, Knights of Pythias. His ancestors had been early Iowan settlers from New England.

His mother, Bertha Wenig, was the daughter of George Kaspar Wenig and Ida Ernst Wenig, both of Cedar Rapids. She studied education at the Armour Institute, now Illinois Institute of Technology, graduated from the University of Chicago, and taught in the Cedar Rapids schools. She was a founder and charter member of St. John's Episcopal Church. She was a member of the Cedar Chapter of the Order of the Eastern Star for 62 years.

His parents separated in 1920, although they remained married. His mother retained custody of the children.

Henry Spencer attended Washington High School in Cedar Rapids, and graduated from Iowa State College in 1936 with a B.S. in chemical engineering. He was a member of the Sigma Alpha Epsilon fraternity.

== Career ==
He worked for the Calco Chemical Company from 1936 to 1946, partly at American Cyanamid in New Jersey. During this time, he was elected a Senior Member of the American Institute of Chemical Engineers. After this, he moved to briefly back to Iowa and then to Connecticut.

In 1948, he visited the United States Rubber Company Footwear Plant.

He began working for Kerite Company in Seymour, Connecticut in 1951. In 1956, he gave a tour of the Naugatuck Chemical Plant to a group of students from Yale University. In 1969, he was elected secretary of the Kerite. Later, he served as vice president. In 1973, he reported that the company employees had voted against joining the United Rubber, Cork, Linoleum, and Plastic Workers Union. The vote had been 208 to 132 out of 380 eligible workers. Kerite was the largest employer in Seymour, Connecticut. In 1977, he wrote a letter to Senator Strom Thurmond strongly condemning the Voluntary Standards and Accreditation Act of 1977, in which he wrote that the act "reeks of socialism." He represented Kerite and served as Chairman of the Wire and Cable Division of the National Electrical Manufacturers Association. He retired from Kerite in 1978.

He served as chairman of the Manufacturers Council of the Lower Naugatuck Valley Chamber of Commerce, and worked on projects including a 'clergy-industry conference,' and the establishment of the Waterbury-Oxford Airport He was also the industrial chairman for the first Valley United Fund Drive, and he sought donations from over 150 corporations for a variety of community organizations.

He was a corporator of Griffin Hospital in Derby, Connecticut, a director of the Lower Naugatuck Valley Chamber of Commerce, and chairman of the Board of Junior Achievement of the Lower Naugatuck Valley. In 1969, he was awarded a special "Founding Chairman" award from Junior Achievement.

He was a deacon and a trustee at the Middlebury Congregational Church. Between 1953 and 1963, he was a feature in multiple musicals and was a founding member a comic opera group at the Middlebury Congregational Church.

He was a member of King Solomon's Lodge No. 7 AF&AM in Woodbury, Connecticut, where he served as the Worshipful Master in 1959. He also served as the District Deputy Grand Master of the Second Masonic District of the Grand Lodge of Connecticut, and in this capacity he visited many lodges including Crystal Lodge in Old Lyme, Connecticut and Union Lodge in Danbury, Connecticut. He was involved in the rededication of the Ethan Allen / Seth Warner Monument in Roxbury, Connecticut. In 1961, as Grand Master, he presented pins to longtime masons at St. Peters Lodge in New Milford, CT. In 1962, He held a meeting of the district deputies at Hiram Lodge in Sandy Hook, Connecticut. On November 16, 1963, he presented a talk at the Meridian Lodge 77 in Meriden, Connecticut on Freemasonry during the Civil War.

He was also a member of the Boy Scouts, the Republican Town Committee, and the Middlebury Hunt. His interest in horses could be traced to his maternal grandfather, George Kasper Wenig. He was a founder of the Middlebury Land Trust in 1969, and later, a member of the South Britain Congregational Church. In 1962, he was recognized as a three-gallon blood donor after giving blood at the Seymour Methodist Church.

He was also a founder and president of the Spencer Historical and Genealogical Society, and authored many important articles in its quarterly journal, Le Despencer. These articles provided important information on the Four Spencer Brothers, early settlers in America. He was a member of the Society of the Descendants of the Founders of Hartford.

== Family life ==
He married Evelyn Margaret Burchard on December 28, 1938, in the chapel of St. Paul's Methodist Church in Cedar Rapids. The wedding was performed by the Rev. Dr. A.W. Henke, Superintendent of the Cedar Rapids District of the Methodist church officiated. Henry's uncle, Ernest Wenig sponsored a pre-nuptial lunch at the Roosevelt Hotel.

Evelyn was the daughter of Frederick Burchard, the owner of the Royal Laundry in Cedar Rapids, and Stella (Johnson) Burchard. She graduated from Iowa State College in 1938 and was a member of the Gamma Phi Beta sorority. Together, they had five children, and one (William Henry) who died in infancy: Samuel, Thomas, Stella, Michael, and Rebecca Spencer. Beginning in 1947, they lived on an old farm in Middlebury, Connecticut where they had horses, a donkey, chickens, and other animals. Evelyn was a trustee and a deacon of the Middlebury Congregational Church. She served on the board of Regional School District 15 and the site selection committee for Pomperaug High School. She was a charter member of the Middlebury Historical Society, and a Master Gardener in the State of Connecticut.

Their family raised many animals, including horses, a donkey named Oscar, cows, sheep, chickens, cats and dogs. Their children were involved in 4-H. In the summers of 1956 and 1958, they hosted dog obedience classes at their farm, which helped to train their German Shepherd, run by Wilbur Gift of the Mattatuck Kennel Club.

Henry was also a weekend sailor on the family's sailboat. On multiple Independence Days, he would take his family to visit the grave of Roger Sherman in Litchfield, Connecticut.

In 1972, he married Mary P. Adams. They lived in Southbury, Connecticut and retired in Green Valley, Arizona. As in Connecticut, he sang in the church choir in Green Valley. Both are interred at the United Methodist Church of Green Valley Memorial Garden.

Henry Spencer had two brothers, George William Spencer, who died in infancy in 1914, and Dr. Carl George Spencer (1917-1985), who was a large animal veterinarian.

In 1988, he presented a lecture entitled "Clergy of the Revolutionary War" to the Green Valley Chapter of the Arizona Society of the Sons of the American Revolution.

In 1989, he travelled to attend the commissioning of the USS Philippine Sea in Portland, Maine, for which his son Mike was one of the top three officers on the ship.

== Genealogy ==
- Henry Christian Spencer, son of

- William Henry Spencer (1878-1936), son of
- George Cogswell Spencer (1854-1926), son of
- Abner Nutting Spencer (1820-1879), son of

- William Spencer (1781–1871), son of
- Ashbel Spencer (1737–1808), son of
- Caleb Spencer (1709–1789), son of

- Obadiah Spencer (c. 1666–1741), son of
- Obadiah Spencer (c. 1639–1712), son of
- Thomas Spencer (1607–1687)
