= William Wadsworth (patriarch) =

American colonial

William Wadsworth (26 February 1594 [poss.] Long Buckby, England – 15 October 1675 Hartford, Connecticut) was an early pioneer of New England, a founder of Hartford, Connecticut, and the patriarch of numerous and prominent Wadsworth descendants of North America, including the poet Ezra Pound.

== Origins ==
William's exact origins have challenged descendants and researchers over the centuries. Recent researchers have postulated that the William Wadsworth, who is born 1594 in Long Buckby, Northamptonshire, England and baptized on 26 February 1594, the son of William and Elizabeth Wadsworth, is one and the same as the subject of this article. This is not proven, though his age, place and onomastics point strongly to this connection.

== New England ==
William Wadsworth's name appears on the top of a list of those who have taken the "Oath of Allegiance" and desired to be "transported to New England", dated 22 June 1632. William Wadsworth is found, again, at the top, on the list of 123 passengers on the ship Lion, who arrived in Boston Harbor, Massachusetts Colony on Sunday, September 16, 1632. He states his wife and three children are with him. Soon after his arrival to Boston he moved to "Newtowne" now Cambridge, Massachusetts. He was made a Freeman of this town on 2 November 1632. He built his home on the west side of Holyoke Street near Harvard Square. He was chosen to be on the Board of Selectmen for Newtowne, and held this position from 1634 to 1635.

== To Hartford ==
William Wadsworth was one of the original Founders of Hartford, Connecticut. In 1635 Rev. Thomas Hooker and his followers from Chelmsford, England had arrived to Newtowne and soon, after dissenting with Puritan leaders in Massachusetts, made up their minds, in council, to move westward. In June 1636, William moved with his family and others of the congregation to a settlement they named Hartford. He was an original proprietor of the town. His home-lot, in 1639, was on the west side of the map from Seth Grant's to Sentinel Hill, extending along what is now the south side of Asylum St., from Trumbull St. to Ford St.

At Hartford, William was active in the community and held prominent public office positions throughout his life. William was chosen "Townsman" of Hartford in 1642, 1655, 1661, and again in 1673; he was also chosen Constable in 1651; he was the town's List and Rate Maker in 1668; he was elected Deputy Constable nearly every session between October 1656 and May 1675 [probably due to age and failing health]. William died in 1675. His will was dated 16 June 1675 and it was inventoried on 18 October 1675 at a value of £1677. 13. 9. (approx. $300,000 US).

== Family ==
Coat of Arms of William Wadsworth

William Wadsworth married 1st) Sarah Talcott (1600 – 24 Oct 1643) of Braintree, Essex, England and had the following children:

- Sarah Wadsworth (1626 – 4 Oct 1648) m. John Wilkock, Jr. on 17 Sep 1646
- William Wadsworth (1628 – d. young)
- John Wadsworth (1630 – 6 Nov 1689) m. Sarah Stanley on 14 Apr 1652
- Mary Wadsworth (1632–1685) m. Thomas Stoughton in 1656

William married 2nd) Elizabeth Stone (2 October 1621 – 1682) on 2 July 1644 at Hartford, Connecticut and had the following children:

- Elizabeth Wadsworth (17 May 1645 – 12 Mar 1715) m. John Terry on 27 Nov 1662
- Samuel Wadsworth (20 Oct 1646 – Aug 1682) unmarried
- Joseph Wadsworth (1647–1729) m. Elizabeth Talcott
- Sarah Wadsworth (b. 17 Mar 1649) m. Jonathan Ashley
- Thomas Wadsworth (1651 – Sep 1687) m. Elizabeth
- Rebecca Wadsworth (b. 1653)

== Descendants ==
The following persons are the descendants of William's sons John Wadsworth and his half-brother Joseph Wadsworth of Charter Oak fame.

- Daniel Wadsworth (1771–1848)
- Decius Wadsworth (1768–1821)
- Elijah Wadsworth (1747–1817)
- Frederick Wadsworth (1786–1869)
- George Wadsworth (1893–1958)
- James Wadsworth (1768–1844)
- James Wadsworth (1730–1816)
- James S. Wadsworth (1807–1864)
- James Wadsworth (1819–1891)
- James Wolcott Wadsworth (1846–1926)
- James Wolcott Wadsworth Jr. (1877–1952)
- James Jeremiah Wadsworth (1905–1984)
- Jeremiah Wadsworth (1743–1804)
- Martha Wadsworth Brewster (1710–1757)
- William Wadsworth (1765–1833)
- Harrison Wadsworth Jr. (1924–2010)
