= Decius Wadsworth =

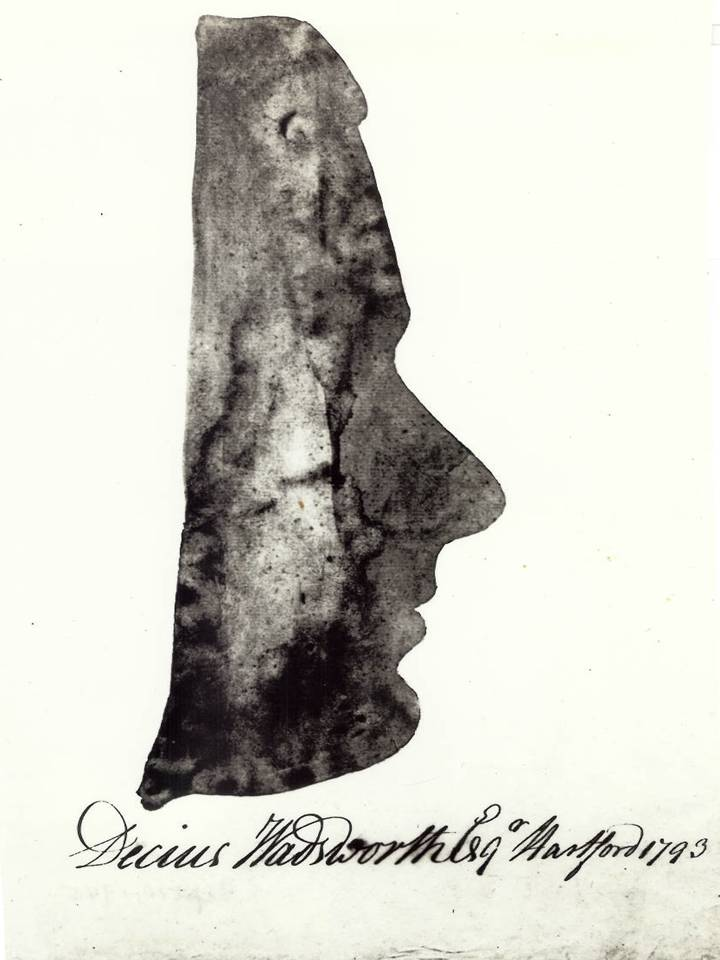
- Colonel Decius Wadsworth
- Military career
- Allegiance: United States of America
- Branch: United States Army
- Service years: 1794 - 1821
- Rank: Colonel
- Commands: 1st Chief of Ordnance (1812–1821)

Decius Wadsworth (January 2, 1768 – November 8, 1821) was a colonel in the United States Army before and during the War of 1812. He graduated from Yale College in 1785 with Honors. He was a military organizer, engineer and inventor. In 1812, became the first Chief of Ordnance for the new United States Army Ordnance Department.

== Family ==
Decius Wadsworth was born in 1768 in Farmington, Connecticut, the eldest son of William Wadsworth, III and Mercy Clarke. He was a scion of the prominent Wadsworth family of Connecticut. He was a sixth generation descendant of William Wadsworth, an original founder of Hartford, Connecticut. He was a contemporary and relative of Jeremiah Wadsworth, James Wadsworth, William Wadsworth, and James Wadsworth. Colonel Jeremiah Wadsworth, his second cousin, left Decius a handsome sum in his will in 1804. Decius never married.

== Military career ==
In 1794, Decius Wadsworth was appointed by President George Washington as a captain in the Artillerist and Engineer Corps. He served was promoted to major in January 1800, supervised the rebuilding of Fort Nelson in Portsmouth, Virginia in 1802, and served as acting Superintendent of the Military Academy from 1803 until 1805, when he resigned.

Just prior to the War of 1812, Wadsworth was invited to lead the newly established Army Ordnance Department and he was appointed as the first Commissary General of Ordnance (later renamed to Chief of Ordnance). His department was charged with the procurement, supply, and maintenance of all cannon, small arms, powder, ball, shot, and other related items for the army. He drew up a set of regulations to ensure a system of uniformity in the armories and in the manufacture of ordnance material. He standardized small arms in the service and accomplished inventories of materiel at posts and forts around the country.

Wadsworth supervised the ordnance establishment across the country (including Springfield and Harpers Ferry Armory), established arsenals on the Hudson River (Watervliet Arsenal) and Pittsburgh (Allegheny Arsenal) in support of the war, made efforts to standardize weapons, particularly artillery, and in 1813, undertook efforts to improve the coastal defenses of the Chesapeake Bay. Wadsworth stressed the importance of uniformity and simplicity. Despite bureaucratic obstacles, he and his staff managed to streamline the number and variety of small arms and heavy ordnance. He led a failed campaign to adopt an artillery carriage based on a British design.

Colonel Wadsworth served as the Chief of Ordnance until June 1, 1821, at which time he left the service due to illness. He died in New Haven, Connecticut.

== Wadsworth's cipher ==
In 1817, he developed a cipher system based on a design by Thomas Jefferson, establishing a method that was continuously improved upon and used until the end of World War II.

Wadsworth's cipher system involved a set of two disks, one inside the other, where the outer disk had the 26 letters of the alphabet and the numbers 2–8, and the inner disk had only the 26 letters. The disks were geared at a ratio of 26:33. To encipher a message, the inner disk was turned until the desired letter was at the top position, with the number of turns required for the result transmitted as ciphertext. Due to the gearing, a ciphertext substitution for a character did not repeat until all 33 characters for the plaintext letter had been used. He received recognition for this method only posthumously.

Military offices
Preceded by Vacant	Chief of Ordnance of the United States Army; 1812 - 1821	Succeeded by Colonel George Bomford

Military offices
Preceded by Jonathan Williams	Superintendent of the U.S. Military Academy; 1803–1805 (acting)	Succeeded by Jonathan Williams
