= Wadsworth (surname) =

Wadsworth is a surname. Notable persons with that surname include:

- Adelaide E. Wadsworth (1844–1928), American painter
- Alexander S. Wadsworth (1790–1851), United States Navy officer
- Alexander Wadsworth (landscape designer) (1806–1898), American landscape architect and surveyor
- Andre Wadsworth (born 1974), American football player
- A. P. Wadsworth (1890/91–1956), British journalist, editor of The Guardian
- Benjamin Wadsworth (actor) (born 1999), American actor
- Benjamin Wadsworth (clergyman) (1670–1737), American Congregational clergyman and educator
- Charles Wadsworth (1929–2025), American classical pianist and musical promoter
- Daniel Wadsworth (1771–1848), American artist, arts patron, and founder of the Wadsworth Atheneum Museum of Art
- Decius Wadsworth (1768–1821) United States Army officer and cipher system inventor
- Derek Wadsworth (1939–2008), British composer and arranger
- Edward Wadsworth (1889–1949), British artist
- Eleanor Wadsworth (1917–2020), British Air Transport Auxiliary pilot during the Second World War
- Elijah Wadsworth (1747–1817) American militia officer during the Revolutionary War and major general during the War of 1812, early pioneer of Ohio
- E. S. Wadsworth (1813–1890), American merchant
- Frank W. Wadsworth (1919–2012), American Shakespearean scholar, author, and sportsman
- Frederick Wadsworth (1786–1869), American businessman and politician
- George Wadsworth II (1893–1958), American diplomat
- George Wadsworth (politician) (1902–1979), British politician
- James Wadsworth (disambiguation)
- Jeremiah Wadsworth (1743–1804), American sea captain, Confederate and American politician
- Harrison Wadsworth Jr. (1924–2010) American engineering professors, author and pioneer in quality control science
- Ken Wadsworth (1946–1976), New Zealand cricketer
- Mabel Sine Wadsworth (1910–2006), American birth control activist and women's health educator
- Marc Wadsworth, British anti-racist campaigner
- Martha Wadsworth (1862–1943), American entomologist
- Martha Wadsworth Brewster (1710–c. 1757), née Brewster, American poet and writer
- Michael Wadsworth (sociologist), British sociologist and socio-medical researcher, director of the National Survey of Health & Development (1982–2006)
- Mick Wadsworth (born 1950), British football coach
- Nathan Wadsworth, American politician elected in 2024
- Peleg Wadsworth (1748–1829), American officer in the Revolutionary War
- Philip Wadsworth (1832–1901), American merchant and politician
- Priscilla Wadsworth (born 1990), American artist
- Walter Wadsworth (1890–1951), British footballer
- William Wadsworth (disambiguation)
