= Canfield (surname) =

Canfield is a surname. Notable people with the surname include:

- Benet Canfield (1562–1611), English mystic
- Brady Canfield (born 1963), American skeleton racer
- Cass Canfield (1897–1986), American publishing executive
- Charles A. Canfield (1848–1913), American oilman and real estate developer
- Chuck Canfield (1932–2017), American businessman and former mayor of Rochester, Minnesota
- Clarke Canfield, American journalist
- Dave Canfield, Canadian politician
- Donald Canfield (born 1958), geologist
- Dorothy Canfield Fisher (1879–1958), American educational reformer
- Francesca Anna Canfield (1803–1833), American linguist, poet, translator
- Glenn Canfield Jr. (1935–2006), American metallurgist and businessman
- Gordon Canfield (1898–1972), American lawyer and politician
- Harry C. Canfield (1875–1945), US Representative from Indiana
- Jack Canfield (born 1944), American motivational speaker
- James Hulme Canfield (1847–1909), 4th. President of Ohio State University
- Jean Canfield (1919–2000), former Canadian politician
- Judson Canfield (1759–1840), Connecticut state legislator and state court judge
- Kid Canfield (1878–1935), American gambler and confidence trickster, real name George Washington Bonner
- Mary Grace Canfield (1924–2014), American actress
- Matthew Canfield (1604–1673), founding settler of Norwalk, Connecticut and Newark, New Jersey
- Richard Albert Canfield (1855–1914), American businessman, art dealer, and gambler
- Robert R. Canfield (1909–1994), American politician and lawyer
- Sean Canfield, American footballer
- Trevor Canfield (born 1986), American footballer
- William Canfield, American medical researcher

== See also ==
- Great Canfield, England
- Canfield, Ohio, named for Justin Canfield
