= James Jeremiah Wadsworth =

American politician (1905–1984)

James Wadsworth
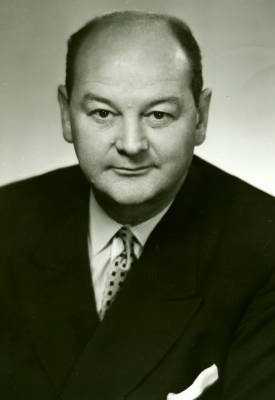

4th United States Ambassador to the United Nations
- In office September 8, 1960 – January 21, 1961
- President: Dwight D. Eisenhower; John F. Kennedy
- Preceded by: Henry Cabot Lodge Jr.
- Succeeded by: Adlai Stevenson II

Administrator of the Federal Civil Defense Administration
- Acting
- In office November 15, 1952 – February 20, 1953
- President: Harry S. Truman; Dwight D. Eisenhower
- Preceded by: Millard Caldwell
- Succeeded by: Val Peterson

Personal details
- Born: James Jeremiah Wadsworth; June 12, 1905 Groveland, New York, U.S.
- Died: March 13, 1984 (aged 78) Rochester, New York, U.S.
- Party: Republican
- Spouse: Harty Griggs Tilton
- Education: Yale University (BA)

James Jeremiah Wadsworth (June 12, 1905 – March 13, 1984) was an American politician and diplomat from New York.

== Early life ==
A member of the prominent Genesee Valley Wadsworths, James J. Wadsworth was born in Groveland, New York on June 12, 1905. He was a direct descendant of pioneer William Wadsworth, a founder of Hartford, Connecticut.

His great-grandfather, James S. Wadsworth, was a Union general in the American Civil War, killed in the Battle of the Wilderness of 1864. Both his grandfather, James Wolcott Wadsworth, and his father, James Wolcott Wadsworth Jr., represented New York in Congress. His other grandfather was United States Secretary of State John Hay. His sister Evelyn was married to William Stuart Symington; they were the parents of James Wadsworth Symington, his nephew.

Wadsworth graduated from Fay School in 1918, from St. Mark's School, and from Yale University in 1927, where he was a member of Delta Kappa Epsilon and Skull and Bones.

== Career ==
Wadsworth was a member of the New York State Assembly (Livingston Co.) in 1932, 1933, 1934, 1935, 1936, 1937, 1938, 1939–40 and 1941. He resigned his seat in 1941.

Wadsworth was medically unfit for World War II because of an injured leg, but aided the war effort as an assistant manager at the Curtiss-Wright Corporation plant in Buffalo, New York. In 1950, he became deputy administrator of the civil defense office for the National Security Resources Board, which drafted many of the civil defense plans that were prepared at the height of the Cold War.

From 1953 to 1960, Wadsworth was Deputy Chief of the U.S. delegation to the United Nations. He was appointed United States Ambassador to the United Nations by President Eisenhower, and he served from 1960 to 1961.

On May 5, 1965, President Johnson appointed Wadsworth to the Federal Communications Commission, and he served until October 31, 1969. Wadsworth left the FCC to join the American team negotiating a charter for the International Telecommunications Satellite Consortium (Intelsat).

== Personal life ==
In 1927, Wadsworth was married to Harty Griggs Tilton (1906–1965), a daughter of Benjamin Trowbridge Tilton and Anna Billings (née Griggs) Tilton. Together, they were the parents of:

- Alice Wadsworth (1928–1998), who married Trowbridge Strong (1925–2001) in 1948.

He died in Rochester, New York on March 13, 1984. He was buried at Temple Hill Cemetery in Geneseo.

== Bibliography ==
- The Price of Peace, Praeger, 1961.
- The Glass House, Praeger, 1966.
- The Silver Spoon: An Autobiography, W. F. Humphrey Press (Geneva, NY), 1980.

New York State Assembly
Preceded by Grant Stockweather	Member of the New York Assembly from Livingston County; 1932–1941	Succeeded by Joseph W. Ward
Political offices
Preceded by Millard Caldwell	Administrator of the Federal Civil Defense Administration; Acting; 1952–1953	Succeeded by Val Peterson
Diplomatic posts
Preceded by Henry Cabot Lodge Jr.	United States Ambassador to the United Nations; 1960–1961	Succeeded by Adlai Stevenson II
