= Cansfield =

Surname list

Cansfield is a surname. Notable people with the surname include:

- Donna Cansfield (born c. 1945), Canadian politician
- Joyce Cansfield (1929–2019), British crossword compiler

== See also ==
- Cansfield High School, Wigan, England
- Canfield (surname)
- Norman J. Kansfield, American minister
