= Elijah Wadsworth =

American soldier (1747–1817)

- Born: November 14, 1747; Hartford, Connecticut
- Died: December 30, 1817 (aged 70); Canfield, Ohio, U.S.
- Spouse: Rhoda Hopkins (m. 1780)
- Children: 5, including Frederick
- Relatives: William Wadsworth
- Military career
- Allegiance: United States
- Branch: Continental Army
- Service years: 1775–1781, 1812–1814
- Rank: Captain (American Revolution), Major general (1804)
- Unit: 2nd Continental Light Dragoons
- Commands: 4th Division of the State militia
- Conflicts: American Revolutionary War; Battle of Long Island; Battle of Monmouth; Siege of Yorktown; War of 1812; Battle of the Peninsula
- Other work: Postmaster, Worshipful Master

Elijah Wadsworth (November 14, 1747 – December 30, 1817) was a captain in the American Revolutionary War and a major general in the War of 1812. He was a prominent military officer, Ohio pioneer, local organizer and leader, and wealthy land speculator.

== Family ==
Elijah Wadsworth was born in Hartford, Connecticut on November 14, 1747, a member of the wealthy and prominent Wadsworth family of Connecticut and a descendant of one of the founders of Hartford, William Wadsworth. Elijah was the son of Joseph Wadsworth III and Elizabeth Cook. His father was the grandson of Captain Joseph Wadsworth of Charter Oak fame. His son Frederick Wadsworth later became the Mayor of Akron. Elijah married Rhoda Hopkins in 1780, and the two had five children together.

== Revolutionary War ==
Wadsworth was a resident of Litchfield, Connecticut at the outbreak of the American Revolutionary War. He immediately volunteered after news of the Battle of Bunker Hill. During this time he became friends with Colonel Elisha Sheldon and became a co-founder of Sheldon's Horse, also known as the 2nd Continental Light Dragoons. The two remained friends for the rest of their lives, staying in contact with one another long after the close of the war. Wadsworth served in this regiment from its founding until the surrender of the British as the Battle of Yorktown in 1781.

During his time in the regiment, Wadsworth earned the rank of captain and served directly underneath Major Benjamin Tallmadge. He would have seen action on several battlefields, including the battles of Long Island, Monmouth, and Yorktown. He would have been ordered to provide escorts of French and other officers to General George Washington as well as serving as a troop commander for other dragoons.

It is highly likely that he witnessed the Benedict Arnold plot and the death of Major John Andre in 1780. Wadsworth would have been serving as a bodyguard for Washington during this time and it is possible that he had been a part of the additional dragoons sent to secure the area while Andre remained in custody awaiting his trial and subsequent execution.

At the end of the war, Wadsworth returned to his home in Litchfield, Connecticut where he had moved to in 1770. There he built a house of his own that was later sold to Lyman Beecher and was the birthplace of both Henry Ward Beecher and Harriet Beecher Stowe.

== Ohio land speculator ==
He was a part owner of lands of the "Connecticut Western Reserve" in Ohio, he being a member of the Connecticut Land Company. He moved to Ohio in 1799 to survey his lands and lived at the village of Warren, Ohio for some time. He moved to a portion of his properties at Canfield, Ohio in October 1802 and made his permanent home there. He owned the largest share of the lands that became Medina County, Ohio. Though he never lived there, the city of Wadsworth, Ohio was named in his honor.

He was heavily involved in organizing the local government of that area and in the creation of its post offices, schools and militia. He was the Postmaster at Canfield for several years. In 1813 Wadsworth was a founding member and elected the first Master of Western Star Lodge #21 in Canfield, Ohio of the Free Masons of Ohio. The Lodge he founded is still active to this day in the greater Youngstown area. Prior to this he was a member of Erie Lodge of the Connecticut Grand Lodge in Warren, Ohio, which eventually became Old Erie Lodge #3 of Ohio when Ohio founded its own Grand Lodge. His was the first wood-frame house built in Ohio, just south of the green in Canfield. He was chosen Major General of the 4th Division of the State militia on January 7, 1804. He served in this capacity when the War of 1812 broke out.

== War of 1812 ==
Under General Wadsworth's command the military infrastructure of Northeast Ohio was built. He recruited and organized the 3,000-man militia and was responsible for the defense of one third of the state of Ohio. He ordered several forts and blockhouses built for the protection of its citizens. He ordered roads to be built and networked between them. He procured the munitions and supplies necessary for the maintenance of the militia. He commanded at the "Battle of the Peninsula" on September 10, 1812, at the mouth of the Huron River. He had to resign his position in February 1814, before the war was seen through, due to his age and failing health.

He died at his home in Canfield, Ohio on December 30, 1817 at the age of 70.

In honor of General Elijah Hill Wadsworth's service during the War of 1812, a group of Daughters of the War of 1812 created a new chapter #472 of the United States Daughters of the War of 1812 with General Wadworth's name. This chapter holds regular meetings to this day in the Canfield/Poland area in honor of General Wadsworth and all veterans of the War of 1812.
