= Frederick Wadsworth =

American businessman and politician

Mayor of Akron, Ohio
- In office 1852–1853
- Preceded by: Charles G. Ladd
- Succeeded by: Philip N. Schuyler

Sheriff of Portage County, Ohio
- In office 1834

Personal details
- Born: March 7, 1786 Litchfield, Connecticut
- Died: February 3, 1869 (aged 82) Edinburg Township, Ohio
- Party: Whig
- Spouse: Statira Smith
- Children: 8
- Parent: Elijah Wadsworth (father)
- Occupation: Businessman, banker
- Known for: Proprietor of Stoddard & Wadsworth Co

Military service
- Allegiance: United States
- Branch/service: Ohio State Militia
- Rank: Lieutenant
- Unit: 2nd Regiment, 4th Brigade, 4th Division

Frederick Elijah Wadsworth (March 7, 1786 in Litchfield, Connecticut – February 3, 1869 in Edinburg Township, Ohio) was an Ohio militia officer, businessman, banker, and politician.

== Family ==
Frederick was born in 1786 at the family home in Litchfield, Connecticut. He was the son of Major General Elijah Wadsworth and his wife Rhoda Hopkins. Frederick was a member of the prominent Wadsworth family of Connecticut. He is a descendant of William Wadsworth, one of the Founders of Hartford, Connecticut. He moved to Ohio, at 13, with his family in 1799. In October 1802 he moved to the new family home in Canfield, Ohio where he grew to adulthood. Frederick married Statira Smith of New York and had eight children. Frederick Wadsworth's House, built 1824, located in Edinburg Township, Ohio is on the National Register of Historic Places (May 29, 1975 #75001520).

== War of 1812 ==
On 26 May 1812 Lieutenant Frederick Wadsworth was appointed, by his father, as the Regimental Clerk for the 2nd Regiment, 4th Brigade, 4th Division of the Ohio State Militia under Colonel John Wilson Campbell.

== Business and politics ==
Frederick was a proprietor and partner of Stoddard & Wadsworth Co. a wool carding works in 1825. Later that year he was elected Secretary of the Portage County Agricultural Society on 9 May 1825.

Frederick was an appointed representative of Portage County during the Canal Commission on 10 March 1826 that worked for the creation of the Portage Canal. Frederick was at the Anti-Masonic Party Convention in Philadelphia, Pennsylvania on September 11, 1830. He was also elected Sheriff of Portage County, Ohio in 1834.

He formed a partnership with several investors, including Simon Perkins and Eleazer Sackett, which led to the creation of the Portage Canal & Manufacturing Co. on February 27, 1837. Frederick was also one of 5 co-owners of the Etna Iron Company on March 29, 1837. That same year Frederick was appointed a Director of the Bank of Cleveland. Later, in 1846, he was the President of the Portage County Mutual Fire Insurance Company.

Frederick Wadsworth was elected Mayor of Akron, Ohio in 1852-1853.
