= William Spencer (judge) =

American judge and politician

The Honorable William Spencer

Member of the Vermont Legislature
- Constituency: Corinth, Orange County

Personal details
- Born: August 6, 1782 Hartford, Connecticut, U.S.
- Died: January 19, 1871 (aged 88) Corinth, Vermont, U.S.
- Resting place: Meadows Meeting House Cemetery, Corinth, Vermont, U.S.
- Spouse: Martha Resign Nutting
- Children: 11, including Abner Nutting Spencer
- Occupation: Lawyer, Judge, Postmaster

The Honorable William Spencer (August 6, 1782 – January 19, 1871) was an American lawyer, judge, postmaster, and representative in the Vermont Legislature from Corinth in Orange County.

== Early life and education ==
He was born in Hartford, Connecticut, to Ashbel Spencer and Abigail Birdwell. He was a college graduate, although the specifics of his education are unknown.

== Career ==
He formed the law firm Spencer & Vilas with Levi Baker Vilas whose son William Freeman Vilas was a U.S. Senator and Postmaster General under President Cleveland.

He was the 11th Judge of the Orange County Court. He studied law in the office of Samuel Miller Esq. of Middlebury, Vermont, and Judge Mattocks of Peacham, Vermont, probably Samuel Mattocks or John Mattocks. In 1804, he was admitted to the bar of the county court, and in 1807, to the Supreme Court. In 1804, he opened his law practice in Corinth, Vermont, where he lived. He was Chief Justice of Orange County from 1820-1824 and then an assistant judge from 1825-1830 after the system was changed. He was Judge Probate for the Bradford district from 1824-1839. He was also postmaster for some time, and a representative for Bradford in the Vermont Legislature. He was also a trustee of the Bradford Academy from its organization. He voted in the Freemen's meetings for more than 60 years.

In 1828, he was listed as the first assistant justice for Orange County and Judge of Probate for the District of Bradford. In 1835, he is listed as Judge of Probate for the District of Bradford. In 1839, he is listed as Judge of Probate for the District of Bradford and as a justice of the Peace.

== Family life ==
He married Martha Resign Nutting and had 11 children, one of whom was Abner Nutting Spencer.

== Genealogy ==
- William Spencer, son of

- Ashbel Spencer (1737–1808), son of
- Caleb Spencer (1709–1789), son of

- Obadiah Spencer (c. 1666–1741), son of
- Obadiah Spencer (c. 1639–1712), son of
- Thomas Spencer (1607–1687)
