= Spencers Grove, Iowa =

- Unincorporated community
- Location within Iowa
- Coordinates: 42°17′04″N 91°52′09″W
- Country: United States
- State: Iowa
- County: Benton
- Elevation: 974 ft (297 m)
- Time zone: UTC-6 (Central (CST))
  - Summer (DST): UTC-5 (CDT)
- Area code: 319
- GNIS feature ID: 464751

Spencers Grove is an unincorporated community in Benton County, Iowa, United States.

== History ==
Spencers Grove was originally the fruit grove of Abner N. Spencer.
