= Abner Nutting Spencer =

American farmer and landowner

Abner Nutting Spencer (May 11, 1820 – November 14, 1879) was an American farmer and landowner, for whom Spencers Grove, Iowa is named.

== Early life ==
He was born in Orange County, Vermont to Hon. William Spencer and Martha (Nutting) Spencer. He moved to Benton County, Iowa in 1841. He moved back to Manchester, New Hampshire four years later, and married Judith Abigail Osborne.

== Iowa ==
Back in Iowa, he began with a small farm in Polk Township, Benton County, Iowa, but when he died, he had hundreds of acres to his name, including a fruit grove known across the county. He received land grants from President Zachary Taylor in 1848 and from President Franklin Pierce in 1855. He built a luxurious home in 1858 where he hosted westbound stagecoach travelers.

He was a devout Christian, he contributed the land, and funds for a church building. He also served as postmaster in Spencer's Grove. He is buried along with many relatives in the Spencers Grove churchyard. These relatives include his son George Coggswell Spencer and grandson William Henry Spencer.

== Genealogy ==
- Abner Nutting Spencer, son of

- William Spencer (1781–1871), son of
- Ashbel Spencer (1737–1808), son of
- Caleb Spencer (1709–1789), son of

- Obadiah Spencer (c. 1666–1741), son of
- Obadiah Spencer (c. 1639–1712), son of
- Thomas Spencer (1607–1687)
