= Mahoning County Career and Technical Center =

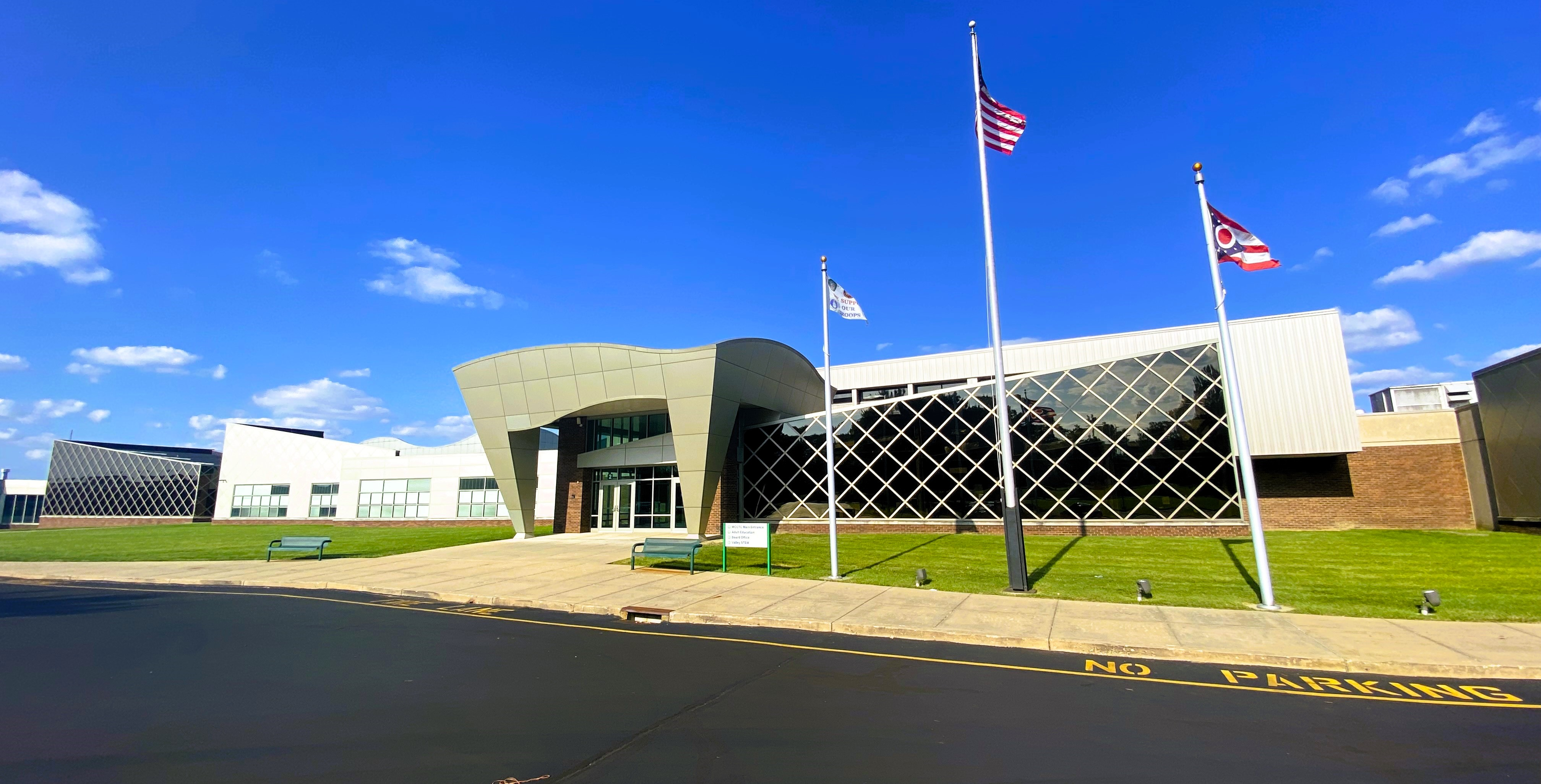

Location
- 7300 North Palmyra Road; Canfield, (Mahoning County), Ohio 44406; United States
- Coordinates: 41.032°N 80.786°W

Information
- Type: Public, Coeducational high school
- Superintendent: John Zehentbauer
- Dean: Ralph Sandy
- Principals: Mara Banfield, Ralph Sandy, David Mullane, Matt Campbell
- Grades: 11-12
- Website: http://www.mahoningctc.com/

The Mahoning County Career and Technical Center (MCCTC) is a public school in Canfield, Ohio, United States. MCCTC has three main programs that can be utilized: STEM+ME2, high school programs and the adult career center. One of the main focuses is to prepare high school students for future careers, but it also puts an emphasis on the adult education center located in the building. The high school programs consist of academy of the arts, global academy, icons academy, and machine team academy. The adult career center allows for people to participate in career training programs, career enhancement or student or business services.
