= Peleg Nott =

18th-century African American leader

Peleg Nott (fl. late 18th century) was an African American leader who in 1780 became the Black Governor of Connecticut, an elected office that nominally presided over the state's Black community, estimated at 5,885 people at the time. Although they held little real political power, these governors were elected by fellow African Americans (both free and enslaved) according to traditional African custom, generally in accordance with their reputations for probity and influence and their owners' prestige.

Born into slavery, Nott was the legal property of Jeremiah Wadsworth, a prominent Hartford merchant, politician, commissary for the Continental Army, and the wealthiest person in Connecticut. After driving a provisions cart during the American Revolutionary War, Nott was entrusted with the supervision of Wadsworth's farm in West Hartford. A "first-rate feller," Nott was described as "remarkable for his exact dress and military bearing" and was well known for the trust that Wadsworth placed in him. Soon after Nott's election as Black Governor, Wadsworth freed Nott and his wife and granted him property somewhere near the present-day Wadsworth Athenaeum.

No records exist of Nott's birth or death. According to the Oxford African American Studies Center, he "is believed to be buried in an unmarked grave in Hartford's Ancient Burying Ground."
