= Canfield Fairgrounds =

Fairgrounds in Canfield, Ohio, US

Coordinates: 41°0′36″N 80°45′13″W

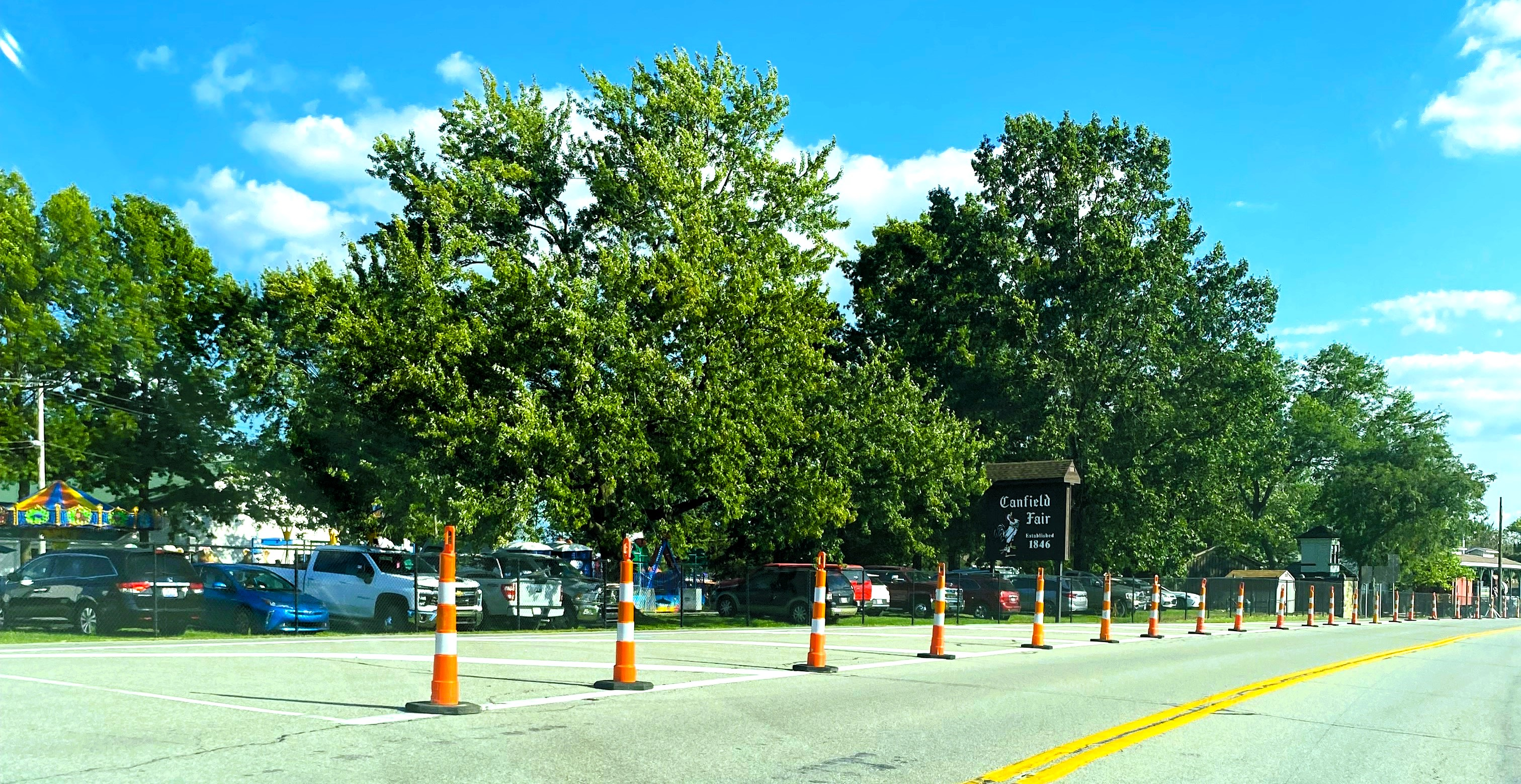

The Canfield Fairgrounds refers to a 353-acre plot of land in Canfield, Ohio, that hosts the week-long Canfield Fair every summer. Additionally, the grounds host several events throughout the year, such as dog shows, fireworks, 5k runs, hayrides, and other community events

== History ==
The inaugural Mahoning County Fair (better known as the Canfield Fair) originated in 1846 at the Canfield Fairgrounds after the Mahoning County Agricultural Society determined that there was a need to increase agricultural awareness in the area. Elisha Whittlesey felt it was imperative to bring the issue to the Congregational Church regarding “Competitive Exhibitions as a Means of Awakening More Active Interest in All Industrial Pursuits”, therefore leading to what we know as the Canfield Fair today. It is the second largest fair in Ohio, following the Ohio State Fair, with an average attendance of 350,000 people in recent years at an average of 60,000 attendees a day. The Canfield Fair is the largest county fair in the state of Ohio.

In addition to an assortment of food, games and rides, the fair also hosts events and musical acts in its famous Grandstands venue. Concerts, monster trucks, demolition derbies and horse racing are some of the events held in the past.

Beginning with The Lennon Sisters kicking off the entertainment in 1956, top music acts have made their way to the Canfield Fair each and every year since 1968. The following is a list of famous musicians and performers that have performed at the Canfield Fair: Bob Hope, Dolly Parton, Rascal Flatts, The Beach Boys, The Monkees, "Weird Al" Yankovic, Brad Paisley, The Goo Goo Dolls, The Band Perry, Pentatonix, and much more.

There were no fairs in 1917–18, 1942–45 nor 2020, although in the latter year a junior fair went on.

== NASCAR History ==
Additionally in 1950, Canfield Speedway, a half mile dirt oval hosted the fifth race of the 1950 season for NASCAR's top division on May 30. Jimmy Florian won the pole for the event and Bill Rexford won and went on to take the Championship. It is notable as Rexford's only victory that season, making him one of a few drivers to win the championship with only 1 victory.

== Sources ==
- https://web.archive.org/web/20080831224648/http://www.ci.canfield.oh.us/HistoryofCanfield.html http://www.canfieldfair.com/
