= David Teeuwen =

American journalist

- Born: June 26, 1970; Norfolk, Virginia, U.S.
- Died: November 4, 2015 (aged 45)
- Education: Ohio State University; Miami University
- Occupation: Journalist

David Teeuwen (June 26, 1970 – November 4, 2015) was the managing editor of USA Today where he helped pioneer digital news.

== Early life and education ==
Teeuwen was born in Norfolk, Virginia in 1970, but grew up in Canfield, Ohio. He received a bachelor's degree in broadcast journalism from Ohio State University and a master's in mass communications at Miami University in Ohio.

== Career ==
Teeuwen began his career in radio. He worked for Radio America in Washington, D.C., hosting a daily news program. He was hired by USA TODAY, a Gannett-owned newspaper in 1999 as a multimedia producer, specializing in audio in the dotcom department which at the time was separate from the print newsroom.

Teeuwen advanced his career in the dotcom department, and was promoted to senior producer of rich media. He later became deputy editor of the design department. In the early 2000s, the department experimented with visual tools and interactive tools. He was viewed as open to new platforms and experimentation, and as one with a good sense of news and a no-nonsense approach.

In 2006, the print and dotcom news departments combined at USA TODAY. Unlike other employees with habits of the daily print cycle who struggled with embracing the digital mindset, Teeuwen who combined digital savvy with journalism seized the opportunity to advance. After the integration, he became website manager and oversaw the site's presentation and functionality.

In 2012, Teeuwen was named managing editor of real-time news by David Callaway, who himself was named editor in chief in July 2012 with a mandate to accelerate the transformation to digital-first. The newsroom was to function more like a wire service.

== Illness and death ==
Teeuwen was diagnosed with intestinal cancer in 2006 which was supposedly cured after surgery and treatment. However, two years later, the cancer returned and doctors told him he would have less than 18 months to live. He continued to work while seeking other opinions and undergoing treatments. On November 4, 2015, he died of intestinal cancer at the age of 45.

A student journalism award at USC has been named in his honor.
