= Wadsworth's cipher =

19-20th century cipher used by the US

Wadsworth's cipher, or Wheatstone's cipher, was a cipher invented by Decius Wadsworth, a Colonel in the United States Army Ordnance Corps. In 1817, he developed a progressive cipher system based on a 1790 design by Thomas Jefferson, establishing a method that was continuously improved upon and used until the end of World War II.

Wadsworth's system involved a set of two disks, one inside the other, where the outer disk had the 26 letters of the alphabet and the numbers 2-8, and the inner disk had only the 26 letters. The disks were geared together at a ratio of 26:33. To encipher a message, the inner disk was turned until the desired letter was at the top position, with the number of turns required for the result transmitted as ciphertext. Due to the gearing, a ciphertext substitution for a character did not repeat until all 33 characters for the plaintext letter had been used. A similar device was invented by Charles Wheatstone several years after Wadsworth.
