= William Wadsworth =

William Wadsworth may refer to:

- William Wadsworth (patriarch) (1594–1675), First Townsman and founder of Hartford, Connecticut
- William Wadsworth (officer) (1765–;1833), Brigadier General in the New York State militia, before and during the War of 1812
- William H. Wadsworth (1821–1893), U.S. Representative from Kentucky
- William Wadsworth (cricketer) (1823–1891), English cricketer
- William Wadsworth (actor) (1874–1950), American silent film actor
- William Wadsworth (rower) (1875–1971), Canadian rower who won a silver medal at the 1904 Summer Olympics
- William J. Wadsworth (died 1949), municipal politician in Toronto, Canada
- William Wadsworth (poet) (born 1950), American poet
