= Craig Snyder =

American boxer

Craig Snyder (born December 25, 1964) is a retired American boxer.

== Career ==
Born in Youngstown, Ohio, Snyder grew up in the Youngstown suburb of Canfield. He started boxing in 1978 and throughout a seven-year amateur career amassed a record of 46 wins and 8 losses, including three Youngstown Golden Gloves titles and one state ABF title.

In June 1985 he turned professional and went on to earn a record of 22 wins, 8 losses with 13 knockouts. On November 23, 1994, Snyder won the International Boxing Council (IBC) Continental Americas Jr Middleweight title in a bout against tough ring veteran Tommy Small, who in 1991 had earned a victory over former IBF Lightweight World Champion, fellow Youngstown resident Harry Arroyo. Snyder held the title until April 27, 1996, and lost it in a split decision to West Virginia Middleweight Champ Billy Fox at Mountaineer Race-track/Casino in Chester, West Virginia. Snyder also challenged for the WBO Continental Americas title against England's Adrian Dodson in Belfast, Northern Ireland, on December 2, 1995. He had also gone toe to toe in a 10-round bout with former Multiple World Champion, Hector "Macho" Camacho. In February 1995 he fought an exhibition bout with recently deceased, former pound for pound world's greatest, Aaron “The Hawk” Pryor.

In June 1998, after a 20-year career as a pugilist, Snyder retired from the ring. In May 2017, Craig was honored with induction to the Curbstone coaches Hall of Fame. On January 31, 2018, Craig became a published author with the release of his book “The Boxers of Youngstown, Ohio: Boxing Capital of the World.”
