= Kerite Company =

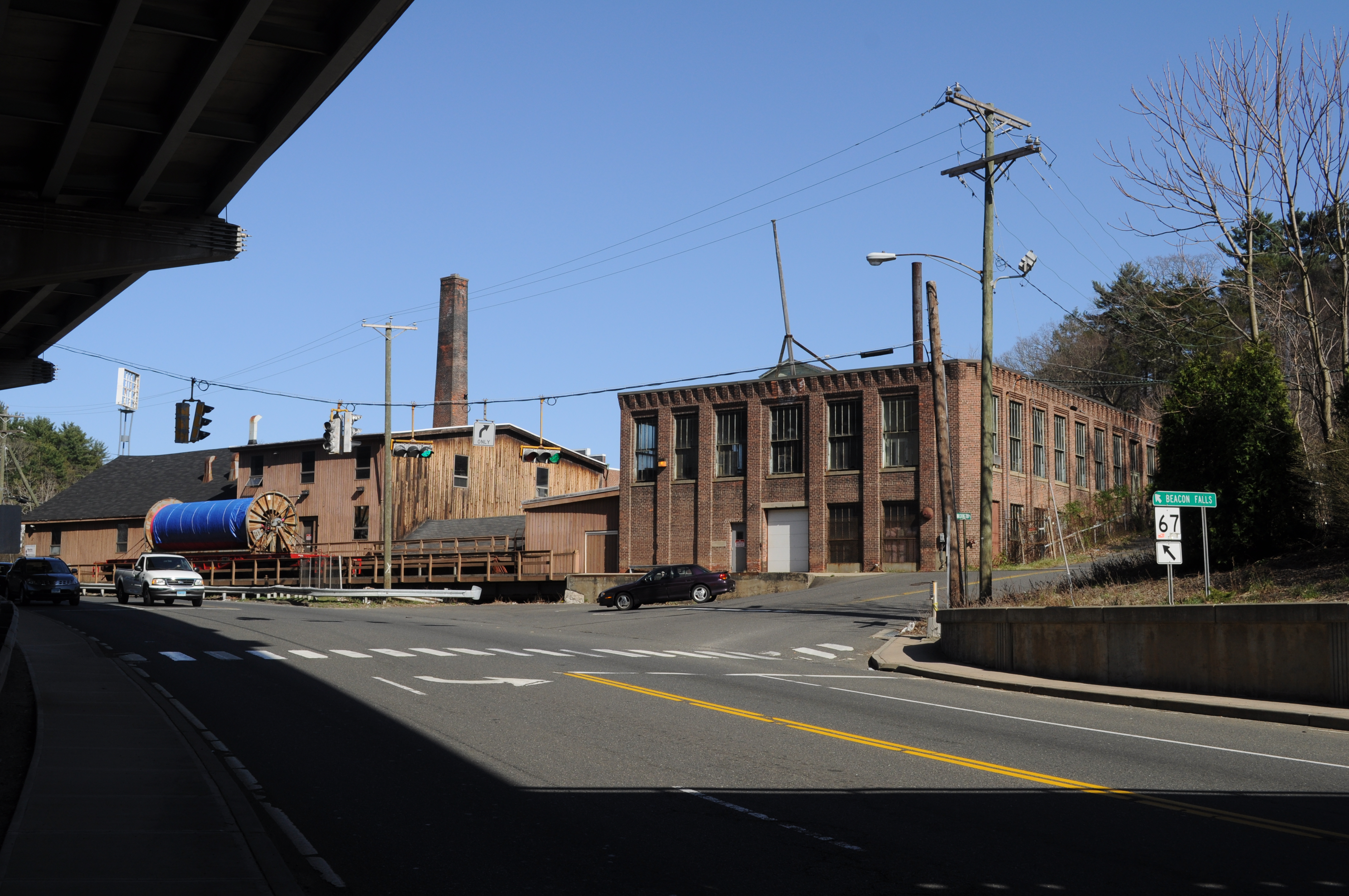
- Company type: Subsidiary
- Founded: 1854; 172 years ago
- Founder: Austin Goodyear Day
- Headquarters: Seymour, Connecticut, United States
- Products: Manufactures and installs power cables
- Parent: Berkshire Hathaway
- Website: www.kerite.com

Kerite is an American manufacturing company, which manufactures and installs power cables. The company is based in Seymour, Connecticut.

== Products ==
Kerite products include high voltage and specialty cable for applications such as underwater use and areas with high ground water levels.

High voltage cable is Kerite's flagship product, made for voltages ranging from 46kV through 138kV. This cable is used for power transmission applications.

Specialty cable includes medium and high voltage cable for subsea installations such as the Panama Canal. It is also used in other harsh environments such as flooded vaults, water-soaked conduits, and high-ground water applications.

Kerite manufactures Electrical Submersible Pump (ESP), which is designed for use in high temperature environments, wells and down-hole applications, and the mining and drilling industries.

== History ==
Kerite Company was founded in 1854 by Austin Goodyear Day, nephew of Charles Goodyear. The company installed the a power cable under New York Harbor in the late 1800s, and cable for the Panama Canal in the early 1900s.

Henry C. Spencer began working at Kerite in 1951 and retired as vice president in 1978.

== Ownership ==
In 1969, Kerite was purchased by the Hubbell Company. In 1999, Kerite was purchased by the Marmon Group a holding company controlled by the Pritzker family. It later became owned by Berkshire Hathaway.
