= William Parker (early settler) =

17th century English colonist of Massachusetts

William Parker (1618–1686) was an early Puritan settler in the Connecticut Colony. He arrived in the Massachusetts Bay Colony in the summer of 1635 after sailing from London on May 21, 1635, aboard the ship Mathew. He settled in Newtowne, the community that is now Cambridge, and became one of the members of Thomas Hooker's congregation. He was one of the founders of Hartford, Connecticut.

== Life ==
Coat of Arms of William Parker

William was an original proprietor and land owner in Hartford, Connecticut in 1636, where his name is on the west face of the Founders Monument. Here his home–lot in 1639 was on the west side of the “road from Seth Grant’s to Centinel Hill,” now Trumbull St. He too part in the Pequot War (an armed conflict in 1637-1638 between an alliance of Massachusetts Bay and Plymouth colonies, with Native American allies - the Narragansett, and Mohegan tribe), against the Pequot tribe.) in 1637 and moved to Saybrook about 1643. He was a pillar in the church in 1646 and a Deputy of Connecticut General Court during the sessions in September 1652, May 1672, May and October 1673, October 1680, May and October 1681, May and October 1682, and May 1683. William was a Sergeant in the Saybrook Train Band, owned land in Saybrook, and he was one of the three appraisers of the estate of George Fenwick in 1660. He was also involved in the inventory of the estate of William Carmackle in 1666.

The History of the Parker Pen Company says: “In the autumn of 1633 William Parker left Dover, England with his wife Margery, aged 17, and eventually set sail from London on the ship “Matthew” departing May 21, 1635. Their ambitious journey no doubt may have been inspired by tales of the great migration in the prior few years by the Wellington Fleet, and several other convoys of ships carrying over thousands of settlers to the New World and The Massachusetts Bay Colony.

His home lot in Hartford in 1639 was on the west side of the "road from Seth Grant's to Centinel Hill" which is now Trumbull Street.

The location of his lot is evidence that he was with Thomas Hooker's party in 1636. He is also listed as an inhabitant who had a right to undivided lands. He was one of the Hartford settlers who served in the Pequot War and attained the rank of sergeant.

He received 36 acres of land in the division of upland in East Hartford in 1666 that he sold to William Pitkin and William Goodwin. He sold his share of land received in 1674 on the west side of Hartford to Thomas and Samuel Olcott. William Parker's six acres were sold in 1684 to Joseph Collier.

William Parker fathered ten children by his first wife. Prior to 1682 he married a second wife, Elizabeth Pratt, the widow of Lieutenant William Pratt. His daughter, Margaret, born about 1650, married Joseph Pratt in 1671, who was the son of Lieutenant William Pratt and Elizabeth (Clark) Pratt.

William Parker moved from Hartford to Saybrook in 1649. He was a large landholder and also had land in Hebron that he had acquired from Joshua, the third son of Uncas.

Edward Johnson in his work published in 1654 wrote of him: "Mr. William Parker, a man of pregnant understanding, and very useful in his place."

William Parker was Deputy to the General Court at the special session of 1652, at the May sessions in 1679 and 1681, and at the October sessions of 1678, 1679, 1680, and 1681.
