= John Skinner (early settler) =

John Skinner (1590–1650) was an early Puritan settler in the Massachusetts Bay Colony and one of the founders of Hartford, Connecticut. Skinner was a member of Thomas Hooker's party and probably came to New England from Braintree, Essex, England. He married Mary Loomis, daughter of Joseph Loomis. She later married Owen Tudor.

Skinner's homesite in Hartford was originally (in 1639) "on the west side of Main St., a little below the present [at 1886] corner of Pearl St." However, Skinner traded this lot with Richard Olmsted for a lot on the highway (later Trumbull St.).
