= Canfield, Ohio =

- City
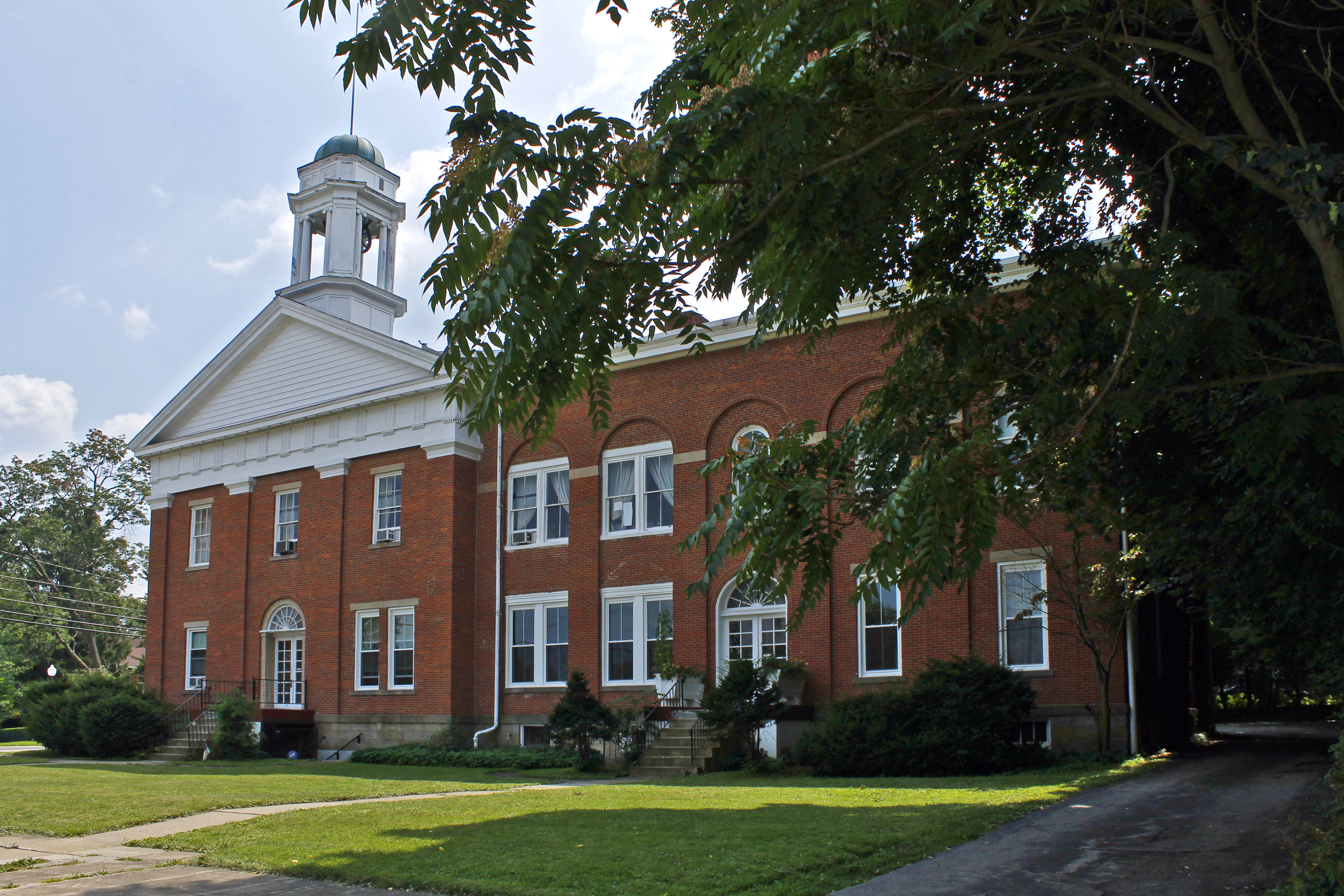
- Old Mahoning County Courthouse

- Seal
- Interactive map of Canfield, Ohio
- Location within Ohio Location within the United States
- Coordinates: 41°01′35″N 80°46′10″W
- Country: United States
- State: Ohio
- County: Mahoning
- Founded: 1798
- Named after: Judson Canfield

Government
  - Type: Council–manager
  - Mayor: Don Dragish

Area
  - Total: 5.14 sq mi (13.30 km^{2})
  - Land: 5.10 sq mi (13.22 km^{2})
  - Water: 0.031 sq mi (0.08 km^{2})
- Elevation: 1,116 ft (340 m)

Population (2020)
  - Total: 7,699
  - Estimate (2023): 7,610
  - Density: 1,508.4/sq mi (582.41/km^{2})
- Time zone: UTC-5 (Eastern (EST))
  - Summer (DST): UTC-4 (EDT)
- ZIP code: 44406
- Area codes: 330, 234
- FIPS code: 39-11360
- GNIS feature ID: 2393729
- Website: canfield.gov

Canfield is a city in Mahoning County, Ohio, United States. The population was 7,699 at the 2020 census. Located at the intersection of U.S. Routes 62 and 224, it is surrounded by Canfield Township and is part of the Youngstown–Warren metropolitan area.

== History ==
Canfield Township was established in 1798 as township number 1 in range 3 by purchase from the Connecticut Land Company in the Connecticut Western Reserve. It was purchased by six men, although the majority was owned by Judson Canfield, a land agent. The township took his name in 1800.

Canfield's first settlers arrived shortly after surveying was initiated in 1798, primarily from Connecticut, although waves of German immigrants around 1805 and Irish around 1852 would occur. Goods were transported initially by horse and wagon about 55 miles (91 km) from Pittsburgh; later, the Beaver Canal served as the primary method for commerce. By 1805, Canfield had approximately 17 homes, a store and a school; it became a trade center for the region.

Canfield was part of Trumbull County until 1846, when the counties in the area were redefined and Mahoning County emerged as a new county. Canfield was made the county seat in 1846 and incorporated in 1849, igniting a three-decade-long feud with larger Youngstown on which should be the seat. The Ohio State Legislature voted to move the seat to Youngstown in 1874.

After the removal of the seat of government, Canfield became the center of the farming community in central Mahoning County. It is home to many examples of classic revival architecture, such as the mid-19th century Charles Ruggles House and Judge Eben Newton House on the National Register of Historic Places.

== Geography ==
According to the United States Census Bureau, the city has a total area of 4.61 square miles (11.94 km^{2}), of which 4.58 square miles (11.86 km^{2}) is land and 0.03 square miles (0.08 km^{2}) is water. It is surrounded by Canfield Township.

== Demographics ==
Historical population
Census	Pop.	Note	%±
1850	527		—
1860	649		23.1%
1870	640		−1.4%
1880	650		1.6%
1890	675		3.8%
1900	672		−0.4%
1910	685		1.9%
1920	806		17.7%
1930	1,015		25.9%
1940	1,141		12.4%
1950	1,465		28.4%
1960	3,252		122.0%
1970	4,997		53.7%
1980	5,535		10.8%
1990	5,409		−2.3%
2000	7,374		36.3%
2010	7,515		1.9%
2020	7,699		2.4%
2023 (est.)	7,610		−1.2%

=== 2020 census ===
As of the 2020 census, Canfield had a population of 7,699. The median age was 46.7 years. 21.0% of residents were under the age of 18 and 25.3% of residents were 65 years of age or older. For every 100 females there were 91.6 males, and for every 100 females age 18 and over there were 89.1 males age 18 and over.

99.9% of residents lived in urban areas, while 0.1% lived in rural areas.

There were 3,229 households in Canfield, of which 27.9% had children under the age of 18 living in them. Of all households, 57.7% were married-couple households, 13.1% were households with a male householder and no spouse or partner present, and 25.4% were households with a female householder and no spouse or partner present. About 28.5% of all households were made up of individuals and 16.8% had someone living alone who was 65 years of age or older.

There were 3,399 housing units, of which 5.0% were vacant. Among occupied housing units, 83.4% were owner-occupied and 16.6% were renter-occupied. The homeowner vacancy rate was 0.9% and the rental vacancy rate was 7.5%.

Racial composition as of the 2020 census
Race	Number	Percent
White	7,077	91.9%
Black or African American	48	0.6%
American Indian and Alaska Native	4	0.1%
Asian	187	2.4%
Native Hawaiian and Other Pacific Islander	0	0%
Some other race	46	0.6%
Two or more races	337	4.4%
Hispanic or Latino (of any race)	203	2.6%

=== 2010 census ===
As of the census of 2010, there were 7,515 people, 3,073 households, and 2,196 families residing in the city. The population density was 1,640.8 inhabitants per square mile (633.5/km^{2}). There were 3,306 housing units at an average density of 721.8 per square mile (278.7/km^{2}). The racial makeup of the city was 96.4% White, 0.4% African American, 0.1% Native American, 1.8% Asian, 0.5% from other races, and 0.7% from two or more races. Hispanic or Latino of any race were 1.5% of the population.

There were 3,073 households, of which 30.8% had children under the age of 18 living with them, 59.7% were married couples living together, 8.7% had a female householder with no husband present, 3.0% had a male householder with no wife present, and 28.5% were non-families. 26.8% of all households were made up of individuals, and 13.6% had someone living alone who was 65 years of age or older. The average household size was 2.44 and the average family size was 2.96.

The median age in the city was 45.8 years. 23.6% of residents were under the age of 18; 5.8% were between the ages of 18 and 24; 19.4% were from 25 to 44; 32.1% were from 45 to 64; and 19% were 65 years of age or older. The gender makeup of the city was 48.0% male and 52.0% female.

=== 2000 census ===
As of the census of 2000, there were 7,374 people, 2,917 households, and 2,143 families residing in the city. The population density was 1,588.1 inhabitants per square mile (613.2/km^{2}). There were 3,043 housing units at an average density of 655.4 per square mile (253.1/km^{2}). The racial makeup of the city was 97.27% White, 1.29% Asian, 0.45% African American, 0.04% Native American, 0.04% Pacific Islander, 0.33% from other races, and 0.58% from two or more races. Hispanic or Latino of any race were 0.84% of the population.

There were 2,917 households, out of which 33.3% had children under the age of 18 living with them, 65.0% were married couples living together, 6.9% had a female householder with no husband present, and 26.5% were non-families. 24.7% of all households were made up of individuals, and 12.1% had someone living alone who was 65 years of age or older. The average household size was 2.53 and the average family size was 3.03.

In the city the population was spread out, with 25.6% under the age of 18, 5.2% from 18 to 24, 24.1% from 25 to 44, 27.7% from 45 to 64, and 17.4% who were 65 years of age or older. The median age was 42.3 years. For every 100 females, there were 90.6 males. For every 100 females age 18 and over, there were 86.7 males.

The median income for a household in the city was $59,434 and the median income for a family was $71,484. Males had a median income of $35,346 versus $20,493 for females. The per capita income for the city is $31,756. About 2.1% of the families and 3.2% of the population live below the poverty line. Including 3.0% of those under age 18 and 4.3% of those 65 years of age or older.

== Arts and culture ==
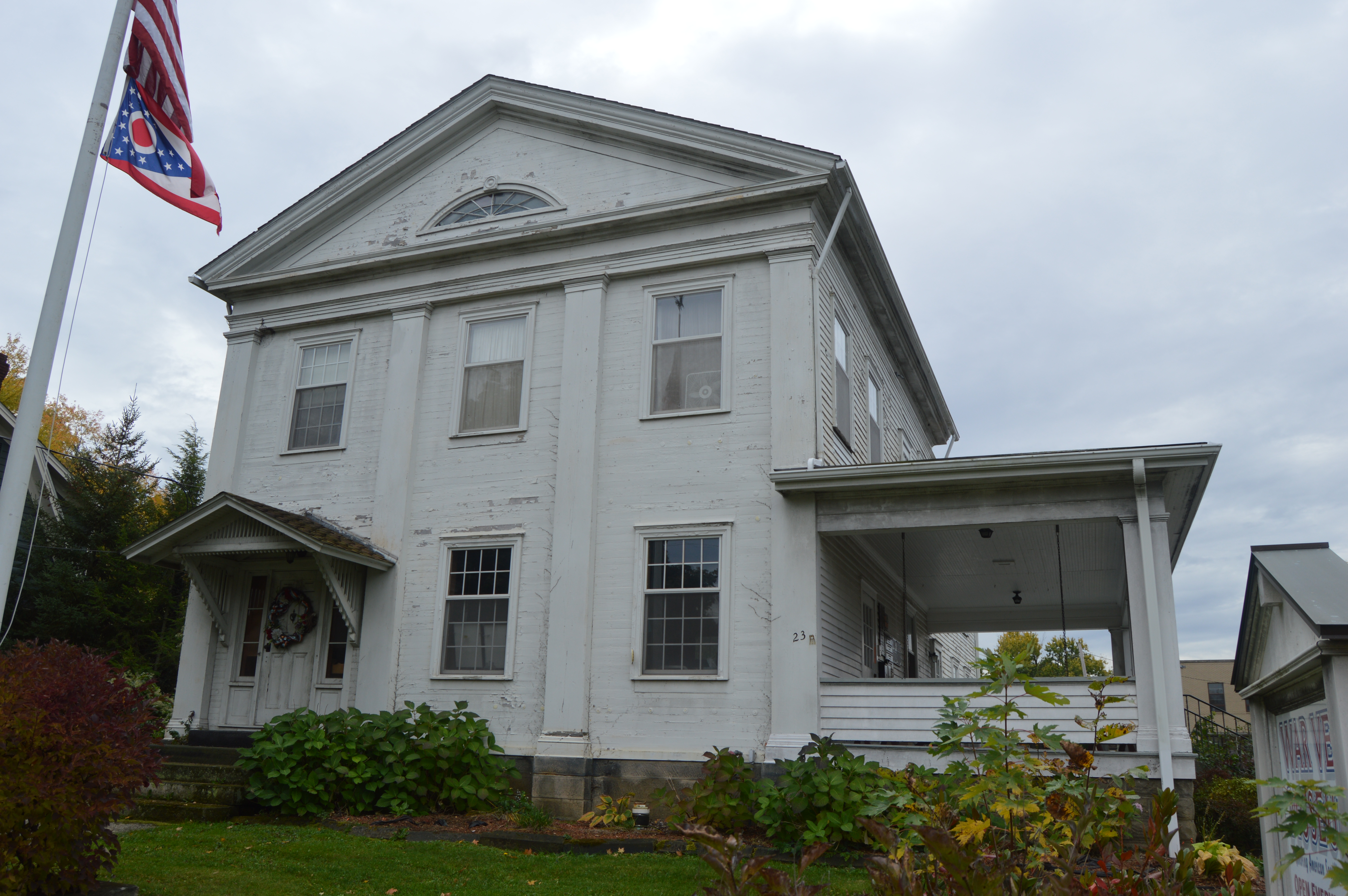
Built in 1809, the War Vet Museum building is the oldest Canfield structure on its original site.

Canfield is best known as the site of the Canfield Fairgrounds, which hosts one of the largest fairs in Ohio, the Canfield Fair. The fair is held over Labor Day weekend and has an annual attendance of 300,000. Beginning with The Lennon Sisters kicking off the entertainment in 1956, many top music acts have made their way to the fairground since 1968, including Bob Hope, Dolly Parton, Rascal Flatts, The Beach Boys, The Monkees, "Weird Al" Yankovic, Brad Paisley, The Goo Goo Dolls, The Band Perry, and Pentatonix.

Canfield Speedway is a half-mile dirt oval racetrack at the fairgrounds. It was on the NASCAR Grand National Schedule in the 1950s and hosted Automobile Racing Club of America and United States Auto Club races through the 1960s.

Canfield is also home to the War Vet Museum, located in the city's oldest structure on its original site and home to artifacts from each American war, as well as Loghurst, a farm museum housed in the oldest remaining log cabin in the Connecticut Western Reserve.

== Government ==
Canfield operates under a chartered council–manager government, where there are four council members elected as a legislature for 4-year terms in addition to a mayor, who serves as an executive. The council employs a city manager for administration. The current mayor is Don Dragish.

In the Ohio General Assembly, Canfield is located in the 33rd senate district and in the 59th state representative district. Federally, Canfield is located in Ohio's 6th congressional district.

== Education ==
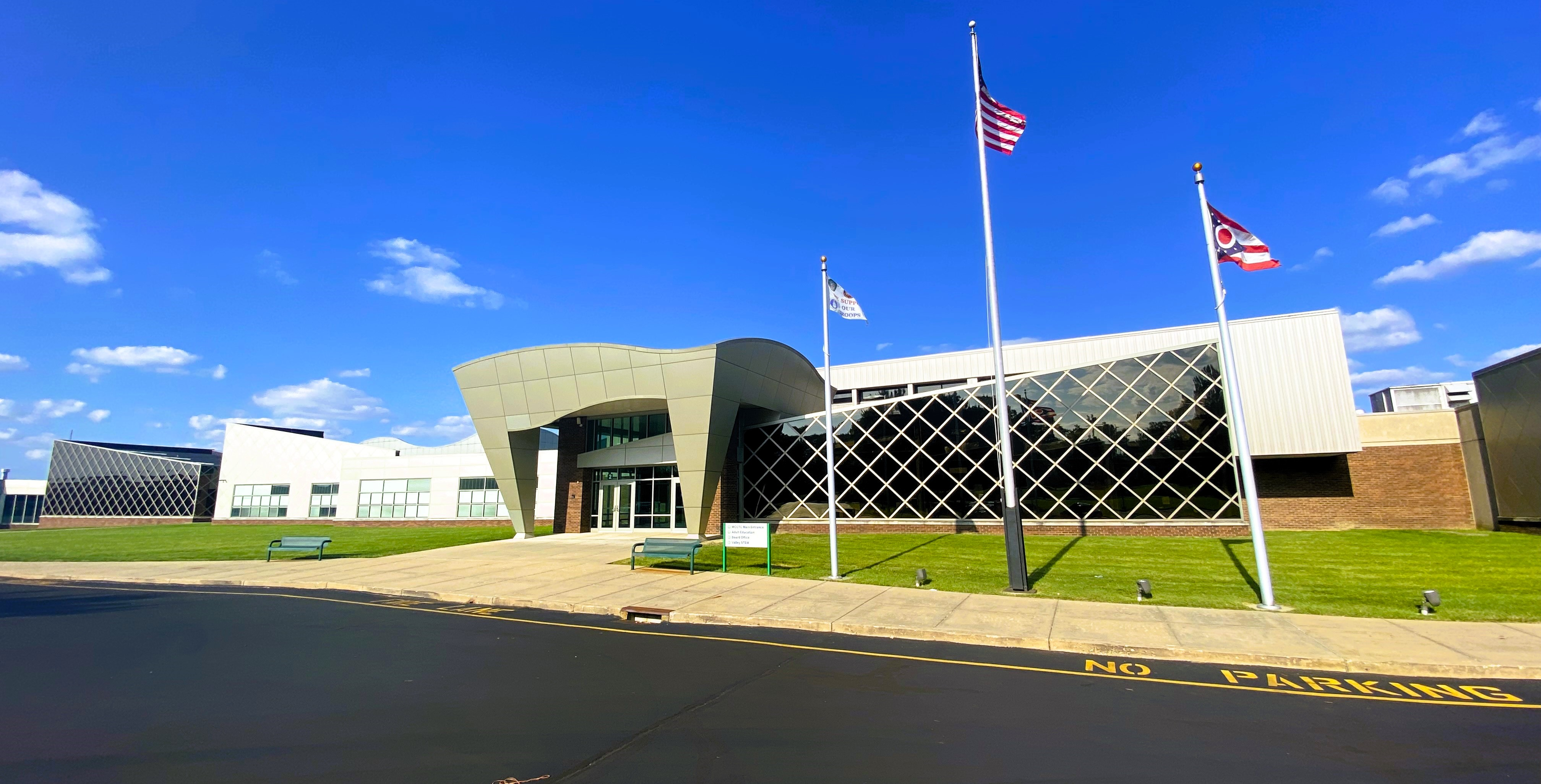
Mahoning County Career and Technical Center

Children in Canfield are served by the public Canfield Local School District, which includes two elementary schools, one middle school, and Canfield High School. The Mahoning County Career and Technical Center is also in Canfield, which provides vocational education and adult education. The city has a branch of the Public Library of Youngstown and Mahoning County.

== Notable people ==
- Frederick William Chapman, minister and genealogist
- Alessandro Cutrona, member of the Ohio House of Representatives from the 59th district
- Bob Dove, National Football League player and coach
- JD Eicher, singer-songwriter
- Columbia Lancaster, first delegate to the U.S. House of Representatives from the Territory of Washington
- Eben Newton, U.S. Representative from Ohio's 19th congressional district
- Georgio Poullas, wrestler
- Ryan Sachire, professional tennis player and tennis coach for the University of Notre Dame
- Craig Snyder, professional boxer
- A. William Sweeney, Ohio Supreme Court justice
- David Teeuwen, former managing editor of USA Today
- Myron E. Ullman, former CEO of J.C. Penney and chairman of Starbucks Corporation
- Elijah Wadsworth, American Revolutionary War captain and major general in the War of 1812
- Frederick Wadsworth, Ohio militia officer, businessman, and mayor of Akron
- Elisha Whittlesey, U.S. Representative from Ohio's 13th congressional district
- William A. Whittlesey, U.S. Representative from Ohio's 13th congressional district
- Denise DeBartolo York, billionaire businesswoman of The DeBartolo Corporation and owner of the San Francisco 49ers
