= Judson Canfield =

American politician (1759–1840)

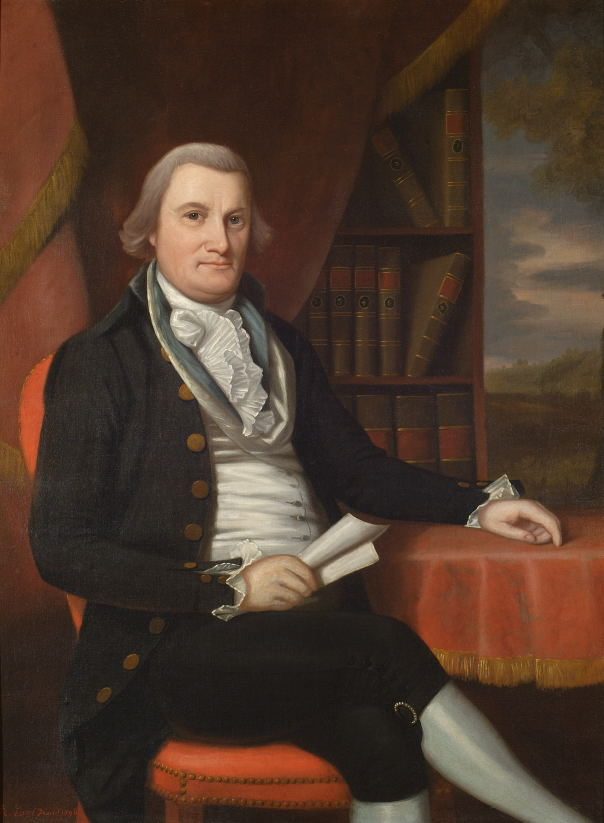

Member of the Connecticut Senate
- In office 1810–1815

Litchfield County court judge
- In office 1808–1815

Connecticut General Assembly
- In office 1802–1809

Personal details
- Born: January 24, 1759 New Milford, Connecticut
- Died: February 5, 1840 (aged 81) New York City
- Spouse: Mabel Ruggles Canfield (m. 1786)
- Education: Yale College (1782)

Judson Canfield (January 24, 1759 – February 5, 1840) was a Connecticut state legislator and state court judge.

Born in New Milford, Connecticut, Canfield graduated from Yale College in 1782, and was admitted to the bar in 1785. He entered into private practice in Sharon, Connecticut. He was elected to the Connecticut General Assembly in 1802, and served until 1809, thereafter serving in the Connecticut State Senate from 1810 to 1815. He simultaneously served as a county court judge for Litchfield County, Connecticut, from 1808 to 1815.

Canfield "was one of the purchasers of the school lands in Ohio", and the village of Canfield, Ohio, county seat of Mahoning County, Ohio, was named after him, commemorating his role as a land agent.

Canfield died in New York City, at the age of 81.
