= Clarke Canfield =

American journalist

Clarke Canfield is a former longtime New England journalist, reporter for The Associated Press, and the author of Those Damned Yankees, The Not-So-Great History of Baseball's Evil Empire. He now works for Southern Maine Community College.

== Biography ==
Originally from Boston, Canfield now lives in South Portland, Maine with his wife and son. He graduated with a BA in Mass Communications from the University of Denver and an MS in journalism from Boston University. Canfield worked as a journalist at several daily newspapers, including the Blytheville Courier News in Arkansas, the Nashville Banner in Tennessee, and the Portland Press Herald in Maine. He served as the editor of three magazines, including the SeaFood Business and National Fisherman business magazines, and has written freelance articles for numerous publications including the Associated Press. In 2005 Canfield published his first book, Those Damned Yankees: The Not-So-Great History of Baseball’s Evil Empire, about the lowlights in the history of the New York Yankees franchise, with Islandport Press.

In 2013 Canfield began work as the Director of Communications at Southern Maine Community College, where he is still employed today. His duties include managing the school's media relations, organizing press conferences, and producing the campus newsletter, The Campus Connection.

== Those Damned Yankees ==
Those Damned Yankees: The Not-So-Great History of Baseball's Evil Empire recounts the dark side of the seemingly all-powerful New York Yankees. A compilation of short stories and essays by the likes of Dale Arnold of WEEI radio, Tom Caron of NESN, former Red Sox pitcher Bill "Spaceman" Lee, and more, the book compounds the intense hatred of the Yankees by those both in and out of Red-Sox Nation. Canfield included every disastrous detail, from the team's horrible trades and blowout losses to the player's behavior and crushing World Series defeats.
