= Richard Risley =

Personal details
- Born: prior to 1615
- Died: October 1648 Hartford, Connecticut, United States
- Spouse: Mary Arnold

Richard Risley (before 1615 – October 1648) was an early Puritan settler in the Massachusetts Bay Colony and one of the founders of Hartford, Connecticut. Risley sailed from England on July 15, 1633, in the ship Griffen(Griffin) with Thomas Hooker, William Stone, John Cotton, and John Haynes. They arrived in Boston on September 4, 1633.

In May 1636, Risley left Massachusetts with almost the entire company he had arrived with two and a half years earlier. They found John Winthrop to be too dictatorial. The group headed west through the wilderness, and after a month stopped in an area now occupied by the city of Hartford, Connecticut.

Within the year, the group started a collective government to fight the Pequot War. By the next year, they had adopted what is now generally considered the first written constitution in Western history, the Fundamental Orders of Connecticut. The group eventually signed a treaty with the Indians for a tract of land and settled down.

The present-day state capitol building in Hartford sits on the original Risley land grant.

Risley died at Hockanum, Connecticut of typhoid in October 1648, leaving his wife and three children, ages two months to eight years.
