= Jeremiah Wadsworth =

American politician

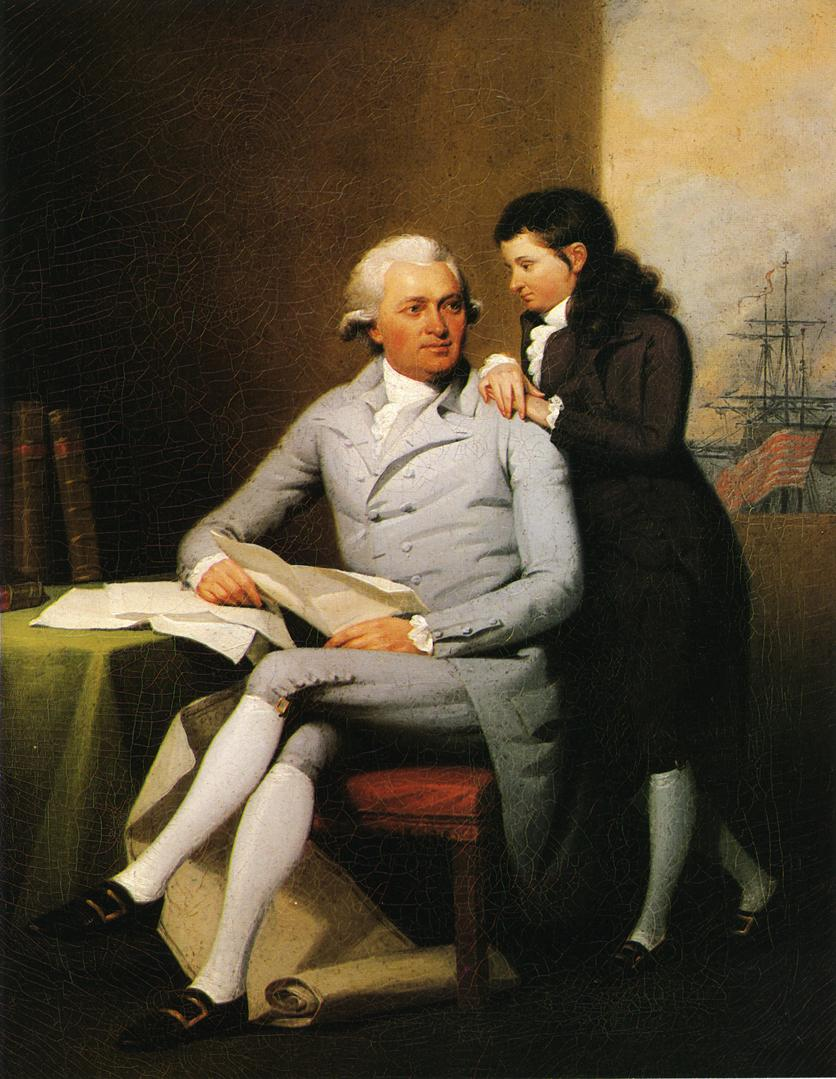
- Portrait of Wadsworth and his son Daniel by John Trumbull, c. 1784

Member of the U.S. House of Representatives from Connecticut's at-large district
- In office March 4, 1789 – March 3, 1795
- Preceded by: Position established

Personal details
- Born: July 12, 1743 Hartford, Connecticut Colony, British America
- Died: April 30, 1804 (aged 60) Hartford, Connecticut, U.S.
- Citizenship: United States
- Spouse: Mehithabel Russell (m. 1767; died 1804)
- Children: Daniel Wadsworth

Jeremiah Wadsworth (July 12, 1743 – April 30, 1804) was an American sea captain, merchant, and statesman from Hartford, Connecticut who profited from his position as a government official charged with supplying the Continental Army. He represented Connecticut in both the Continental Congress and the United States House of Representatives.

== Early life ==
He was a son of Daniel Wadsworth and Abigail (née Talcott) Wadsworth. He was a descendant of William Wadsworth, one of the founders of Hartford and a pastor of the town's Center Congregational Church. He went to sea in 1761 at the age of 18 for health reasons, starting as a regular sailor on one of his uncle's ships.

== Career ==
Wadsworth eventually rose to become first mate of a vessel and eventually a captain who made his fortune in the West India trade.

=== During the American Revolution ===
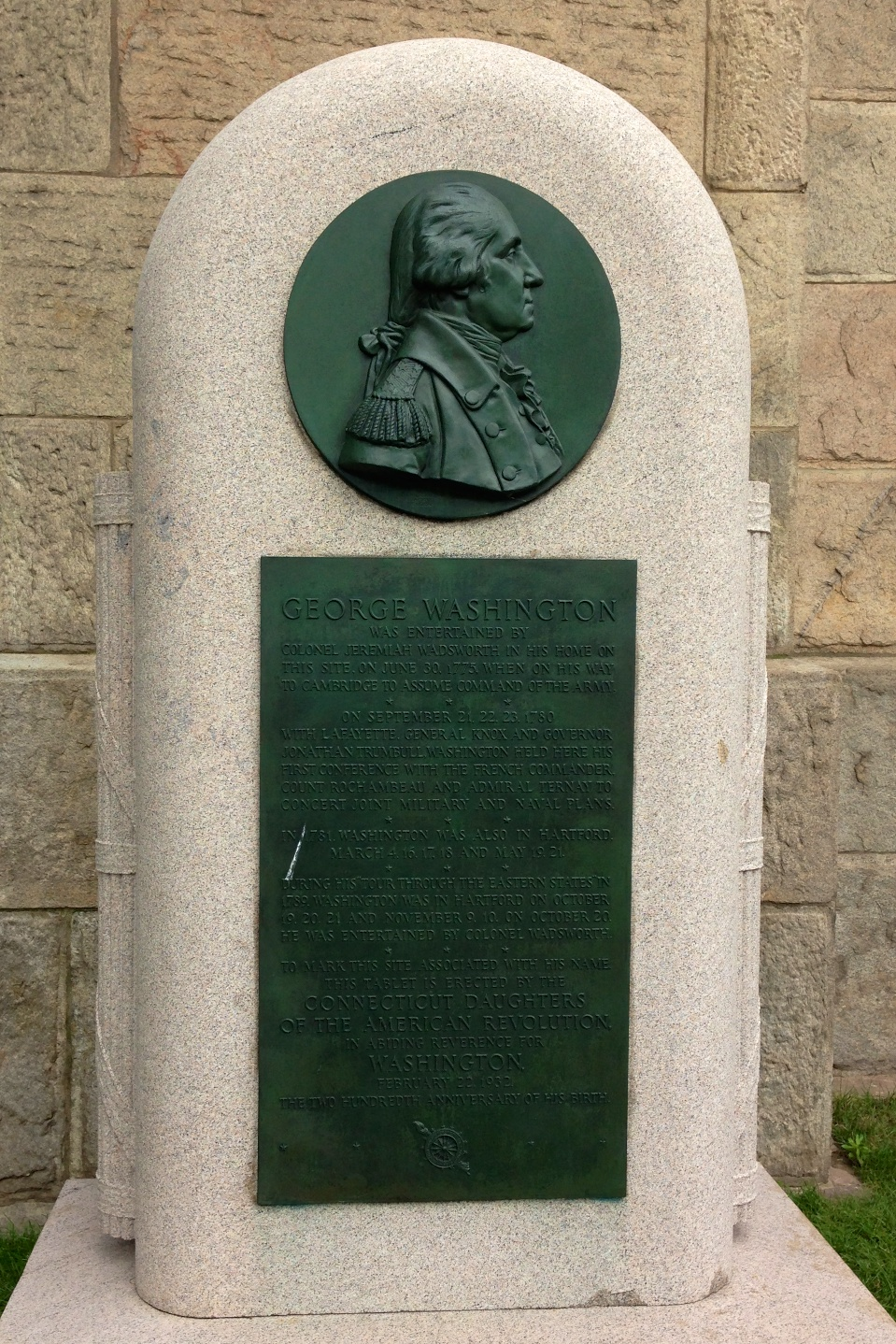
Tablet dedicated to George Washington and honoring Jeremiah Wadsworth

When the war started, Wadsworth was appointed to a committee charged with buying 5,000 pairs of yarn stockings for the army (which had already been sent to Canada). He served on another committee to procure 1,800 pounds of "lawful money in specie" in exchange for bills for use by the army. The Connecticut General Assembly later commissioned him and Col. Jonathan Fitch to find a large number of tin kettles for the army. The next assignment was to buy up as much pork as he could (both to furnish the American army and to keep it out of the hands and stomachs of the British forces).

Having served effectively in these assignments in Connecticut, Congress elected him Deputy Commissary General of Purchases on June 17, 1777, but he resigned in August. When Congress reorganized the supply system, he became Commissary General in April 1778, resigning in December 1779.

Reaching the rank of colonel, he became commissary for Comte de Rochambeau's army until the war's end. In the summer of 1783, he went to Paris to report to the French on his activities. He is said to have turned a good profit for himself in his transactions for supplies.

Wadsworth was a good friend of Nathanael Greene and during the time Greene was Quarter-master General they formed some investment partnerships.

Like many of Connecticut's elite at the time, Wadsworth owned slaves. He bought an entire family, including Peleg Nott, who went on to become a Black Governor of Connecticut, presiding over the state's Black community. Wadsworth freed Nott circa 1780. For a time, Wadsworth owned a 6,600-acre plantation in South Carolina, along with the 129 slaves who farmed it.

=== After the Revolution ===
Wadsworth became a "pioneer in banking, insurance, and the breeding of cattle" after the war, according to historian North Callahan. He served as the second President of the Bank of New York from 1785 to 1786.

He was a member of the Continental Congress in 1788 and a member of the Connecticut convention which ratified the U.S. Constitution in 1788. From 1789 to 1795 he served three terms in the U.S. House of Representatives. Wadsworth initially lost reelection in 1790 but was specially reelected when his initial successor Pierpont Edwards declined to take his seat. He was a member of the Connecticut House of Representatives in 1795 and of the state Executive Council from 1795 to 1801, and simultaneously served as a judge of the Connecticut Supreme Court of Errors.

He was appointed Treaty Commissioner, by George Washington, at the Treaty of Big Tree between the U.S. and the Seneca nation in 1797.

== Personal life ==
In 1767, Wadsworth married Mehithabel Russell, a daughter of William H. Russell and Mary (née Pierpont) Russell. His domestic arrangements were described by Lydia Sigourney in her memoirs. He built two mansions near his own house, one for his daughter Catharine, who had married Nathaniel Terry, and one for his son, Daniel Wadsworth.

He died in Hartford, Connecticut, April 30, 1804, and is interred in the Ancient Burying Ground.

== Legacy ==
In World War II, the United States Liberty ship SS Jeremiah Wadsworth was named in his honor.

== Footnotes ==
U.S. House of Representatives
Preceded by District created	Member of the U.S. House of Representatives from Connecticut's at-large congressional district March 4, 1789 – March 3, 1795	Succeeded by Nathaniel Smith
