= Harrison Wadsworth Jr. =

American systems engineer

Harrison M. Wadsworth
- Born: August 20, 1924; Duluth, Minnesota
- Died: August 3, 2010 (aged 85); Atlanta, Georgia
- Education: B.I.E. and M.S. Degrees from the Georgia Institute of Technology; PhD from Case Western Reserve University
- Occupation: Professor/Consultant
- Employer: Georgia Institute of Technology
- Known for: Expert in statistics, industrial systems engineering and quality control
- Title: Professor of statistics in the H. Milton Stewart School of Industrial and Systems Engineering at the Georgia Institute of Technology.

Harrison Morton Wadsworth Jr. (August 20, 1924 – August 3, 2010) was an American engineering professor of statistical methods, author and specialist in quality control science. Born in Duluth, Minnesota, he grew up in Miami Beach, Florida and lived most of his life in Atlanta, Georgia. Wadsworth received his B.I.E. Degree and M.S. Degrees from the Georgia Institute of Technology and his PhD from Case Western Reserve University. He was a professor of statistics in the Industrial and Systems Engineering Department at the Georgia Institute of Technology from 1960 through 1991, and taught in China and Turkey. He operated his own quality auditing consulting business upon retiring in 1991. He was a veteran of the U.S. Army, serving as a supply sergeant in the Philippines in World War II, and in the Korean War.

== Career ==
He was a U.S. delegate and subcommittee chair to the International Organization for Standardization and the American National Standards Institute. He authored or co-authored several textbooks and served as editor of the Journal of Quality Technology. He received numerous awards and medals, including the American Society for Quality's highest honor, its Distinguished Service Medal and he was a Fellow of the American Statistical Association.

== Books authored ==
He was the author and editor of several handbooks on statistical methods including:

- The Handbook of Statistical Methods for Engineers and Scientists (1997)
- Modern Methods For Quality Control and Improvement (2001)
- Assessing the Effect of Moop Gear on Performance of Selected Tasks (1988)
- Expert system for task degradation analysis (1987)
- Degradation Analysis Methodology for Signal Tasks (1986)
- Establishing Equivalency of Sampling Devices (1982)
- Research Support on Method-Model Development (1976)

== Personal life ==
Wadsworth was born in Duluth Minnesota, where his father, Harrison Morton Wadsworth Sr., worked as a manager at a steel mill. Harrison Sr. was badly burned in an accident at the mill in 1929, and later died as a result of what was then known as blood poisoning (now known as a staph infection). Harrison Jr. then moved with his mother and sisters, Eleanor and Mary Alice, to Miami Beach, Florida.

During World War II, he was drafted into the United States Army. Having keen mathematical skills, he was made a supply sergeant and was shipped to the Philippines, where he supported American Pacific Theater of Operations. After the war, he remained in the Army Reserves. In 1950, he married Irene Hawkins Wadsworth, a Registered Nurse. The two remained happily married for 59 years until his death of complications from lymphoma in 2010. They lived in Cleveland, Ohio while Harrison completed his doctoral studies. Upon earning his PhD, the family moved to Atlanta, Georgia. Harrison and Irene had two children and seven grandchildren.
