= Daniel Wadsworth =

American artist and collector

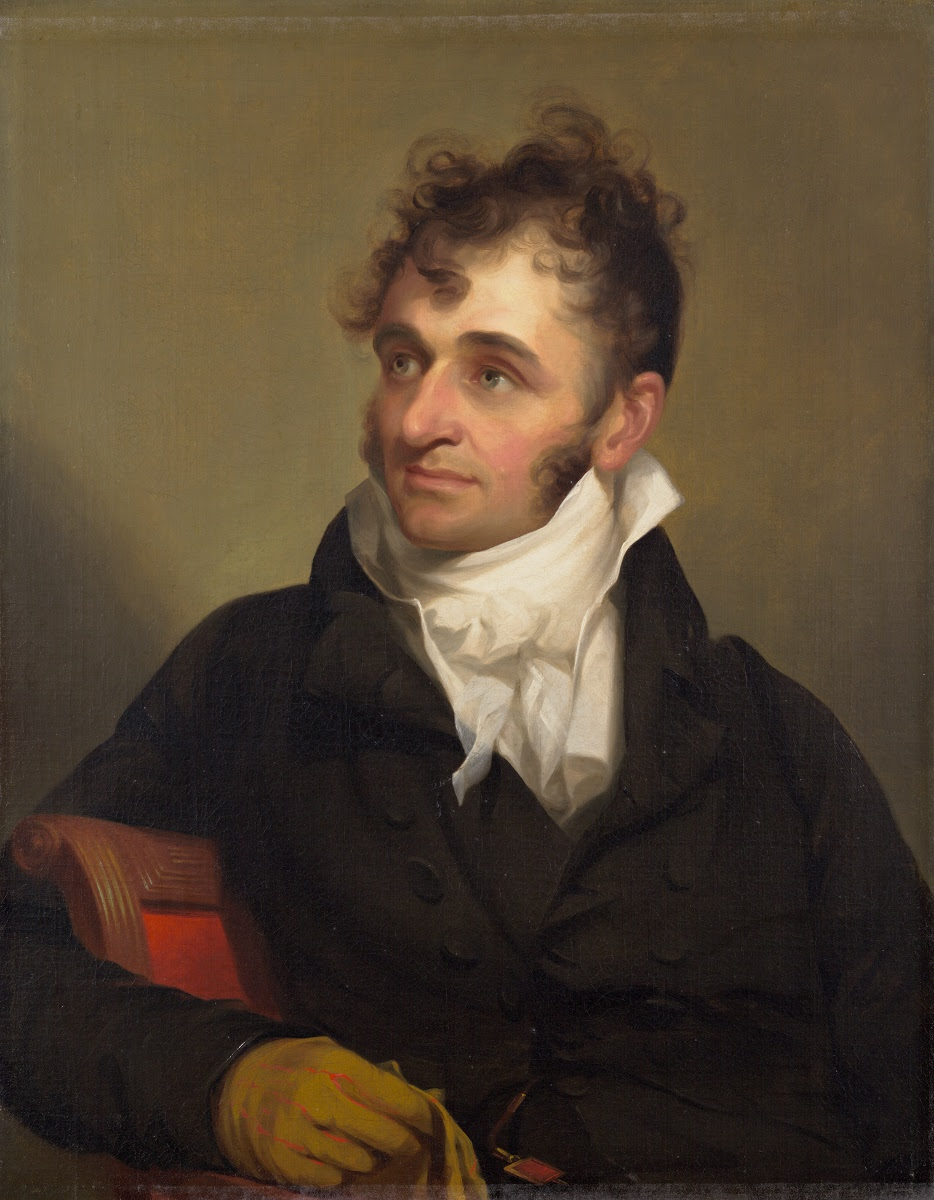
- portrait by Thomas Sully, 1807
- Born: August 8, 1771; Middletown
- Died: July 28, 1848 (aged 76); Hartford
- Occupation: Art collector
- Parent(s): Jeremiah Wadsworth

Daniel Wadsworth (August 3, 1771 – July 28, 1848) of Hartford, Connecticut, was an American amateur artist and architect, arts patron and traveler. He is most remembered as the founder of the Wadsworth Atheneum Museum of Art in his home city.

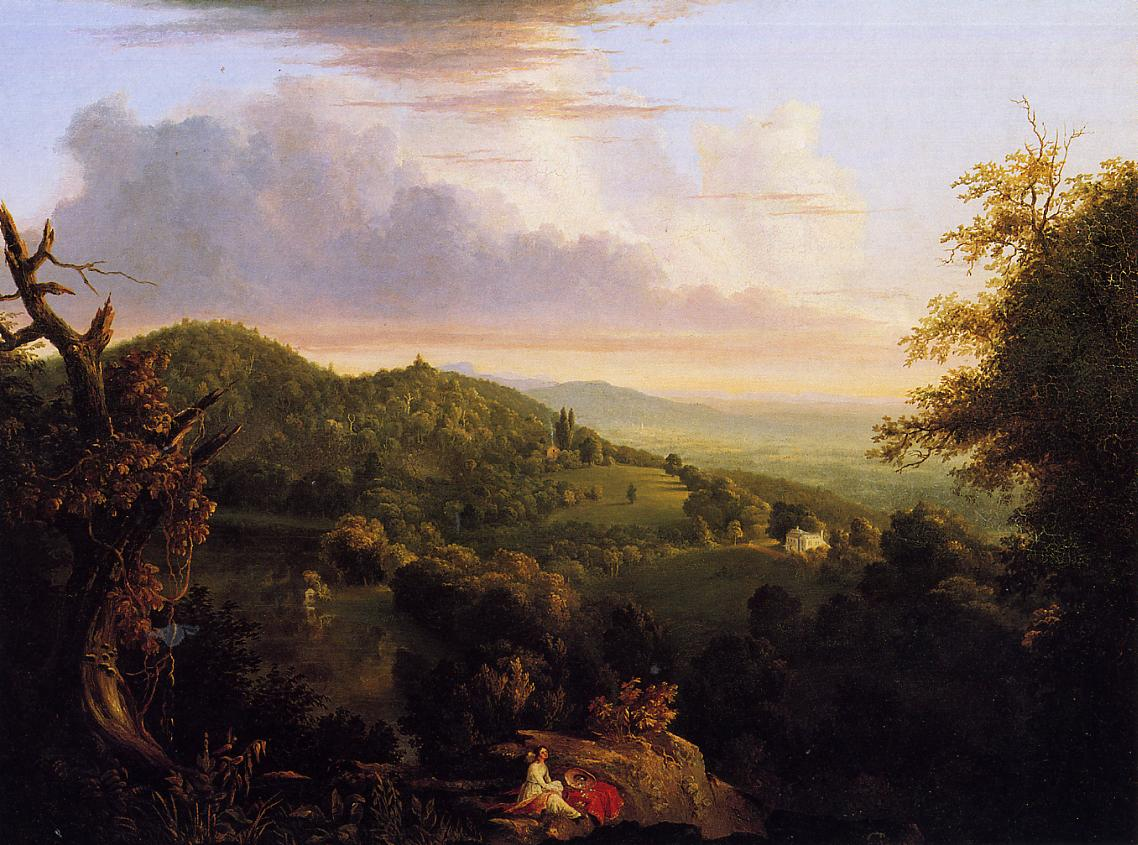
View of Monte Video, Seat of Daniel Wadsworth, Esq., oil on panel, 1828, Thomas Cole. Wadsworth Atheneum

== Early life ==
Daniel Wadsworth was descended from some of the first Puritan settlers of the Connecticut colony. His father Jeremiah Wadsworth was one of the wealthiest men in Hartford, and his mother Mehithabel (née Russell) Wadsworth was also from an elite family. His sister, Catharine Wadsworth, married U.S. Representative Nathaniel Terry Jr. The senior Wadsworth was involved in trade, manufacturing, banking, and insurance.

Young Daniel was educated partly at home; he was introduced to the great art and architecture of the royal courts of Europe by his father, who traveled there with him (see Grand Tour).

== Career ==
Wadsworth was an accomplished amateur artist and architect. He took many trips with writer Benjamin Silliman and Trumbull to Niagara Falls and the White Mountains (New Hampshire) to write accounts and sketch the landscapes they saw.

In later years, he became a patron of painters like Thomas Cole and advised him and others on itineraries for their own sketching expeditions. He played a formative role in the life and work of a fellow son of Hartford, Frederic Edwin Church, whose prodigious talent Wadsworth was among the first to recognize. A letter of introduction to Cole vouched for the astonishing natural ability of this young man and secured him the chance to live and study with Cole. This launched Church on a meteoric career that would see him become the most famous and financially successful artist in America.

Determined to promote American artists, Wadsworth purchased the entire collection of the American Academy of the Fine Arts in New York. He then announced his plans to build "a Gallery of Fine Arts" on Main Street in Hartford, which would later be named after him as the Wadsworth Atheneum. He provided many of the art objects initially displayed from his personal collection in addition to the ones from the American Academy. He also helped poet Lydia Sigourney with the publication of her first books.

== Personal life ==
In 1794, Wadsworth was married to Faith Trumbull (1769–1846), a daughter of U.S. Senator and Governor of Connecticut, Jonathan Trumbull Jr. and Eunice (née Backus) Trumbull. He later became acquainted with her uncle, John Trumbull, one of the period's most celebrated historical painters.

Wadsworth died in Hartford on July 28, 1848.
