= Thomas Spencer (settler) =

Early colonist of Hartford, Connecticut (1607-1687)

Sergeant Thomas Spencer (March 29, 1607 – September 11, 1687) was an early settler of Hartford, Connecticut. He was one of the "Four Spencer Brothers" who came from England to the United States.

He was born in Stotfold, Bedfordshire, England to Gerard Spencer and Alice Whitbread. He was a freeman in Cambridge, Massachusetts in 1634, and moved to Hartford in 1637. He served in the Pequot War and was a 'sergeant of the trainband' in 1650. His name appears on the Founders Monument as a Founder of Hartford. He eventually accumulated a substantial amount of property in Hartford.

He married Anne Dorryfall in Cambridge, Massachusetts in 1634, but after her death, Thomas remarried in Hartford, to Sarah Bearding on September 11, 1645.
