= History of Hartford, Connecticut =

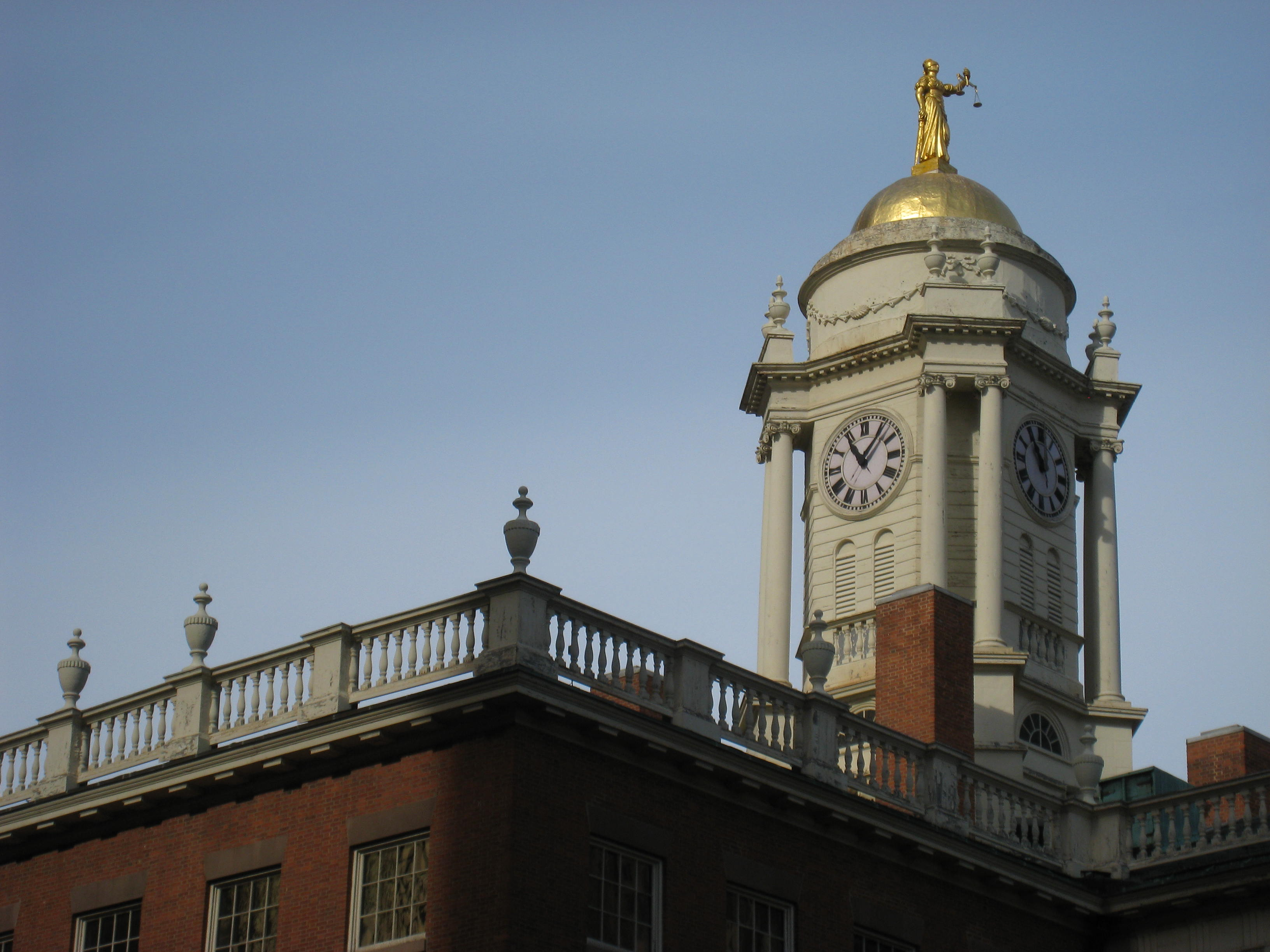
Old State House, completed 1796

The History of Hartford, Connecticut has occupied a central place in Connecticut's history from the state's origins to the present, as well as the greater history of the United States of America.

== Founders ==
Historical population of Hartford
1756	3,027
1774	5,031
1782	5,495
1800	4,090
1810	5,347
1820	6,901
1830	9,789
1840	12,793
1850	13,555
1860	29,152
1870	37,743
1880	42,551
1890	53,230
1900	79,850
1910	98,915
1920	138,036
1930	164,072
1940	166,267
1950	177,397
1960	162,178
1970	158,017
1980	136,392
1990	139,739
2000	121,578
2002	124,558 (est.)

Here is a partial list of the 163 men and women included in the Book of Distribution of Land as being those who settled in Hartford, Connecticut, before February, 1640. The full list of names is on a monument in the Ancient Burying Ground, beside the buildings of the First Church of Christ in Hartford.

There are later settlers who lived in Hartford in the 17th century, but are not considered Founders of Hartford. Proof of descent from any of these people permits admission to the Society of the Descendants of the Founders of Hartford, an American hereditary society established in 1931.

- Adams, Jeremy
- Allyn, Matthew
- Andrews, Francis
- Bidwell, John
- Bliss, Thomas
- Bull, Thomas
- Bunce (Bunch), Thomas
- Chester, Dorothy
- Day, Robert
- Easton Sr., Joseph
- Elmer, Edward
- Ely, Nathaniel
- Ensign, James
- Hale, Samuel
- Hales, Thomas
- Haynes, John
- Higginson, Rev John
- Hills, William
- Hooker, Reverend Thomas
- Hopkins, Edward
- Keeler, Ralph
- Kellogg, Nathaniel
- Lyman, Richard
- Marvin, Matthew
- Moody, Samuel
- Munson, Thomas
- Olmsted, Richard
- Parker, William
- Pratt, Lieut. William
- Richards, Nathaniel
- Risley, Richard
- Scott, Thomas
- Skinner, John
- Spencer, Thomas
- Stanton, Thomas
- Steele, George
- Steele, John
- Stone, Rev Samuel
- Stocking, George
- Talcott, John
- Wadsworth, William
- Warner, Andrew
- Webb, Richard
- Webster, John
- Welles, Thomas
- Wyllys, George

== Colonial days ==
Dutch fur traders from New Amsterdam, now New York City, set up trade on the site as early as 1623, following Adriaen Block's exploration in 1614. The Dutch named their post Fort Goede Hoop or the 'Hope House' (Huys de Hoop) and helped expand the New Netherland colony, roughly analogous to the modern-day New York, New Jersey & Connecticut Tri-State Region, to the banks of the Connecticut River. Prior to the Dutch arrival, the Native Americans who inhabited the area had called it Suckiaug. By 1633, Jacob van Curler had added a block house and palisade to the post and New Amsterdam had sent a small garrison and pair of cannons. The fort was abandoned by 1654, but its neighborhood in Hartford is still known as Dutch Point.

The first English settlers arrived in 1635. Pastor Thomas Hooker and Governor John Haynes led 100 settlers with 130 head of cattle in a trek from Newtown (now Cambridge, Massachusetts) in the Massachusetts Bay Colony and started their settlement just north of the Dutch fort. The settlement was originally called Newtown, but was changed to Hartford in 1637 to honor the English town of Hertford. The explorer also created the town of Windsor (created in 1633). The fledgling colony along the Connecticut River had issues with the authority by which it was to be governed because it was outside of the jurisdiction of the Massachusetts Bay Colony's charter. Therefore, Thomas Hooker wrote the Fundamental Orders of Connecticut, a document investing the authority to govern in the people, instead of in a higher power. Hooker stated May 31, 1638:

The foundation of authority is laid, firstly, in the free consent of the people.

Some historians believe Hooker's concepts of self-rule were the forerunners of the United States Constitution. The Orders were ratified on January 14, 1639 and were transcribed into the Connecticut Colony records by future Governor Thomas Welles.

== 19th century ==
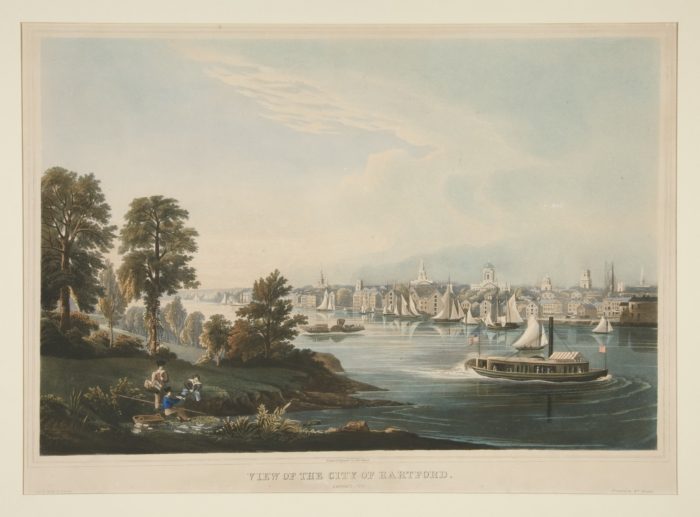
Hartford city. Circa 1840s

On December 15, 1814, the Hartford Convention was called to order in Hartford. Delegations from the five New England states, (Maine was still part of Massachusetts at that time) were sent to Hartford to discuss New England's possible secession from the United States.

During the early 19th century, the Hartford area was a center of abolitionist activity. The most famous abolitionist family was the Beechers. The Reverend Lyman Beecher was an important Congregational minister known for his anti-slavery sermons. His daughter, Harriet Beecher Stowe, wrote the famous Uncle Tom's Cabin, while her brother, the Reverend Henry Ward Beecher, was a noted clergyman who vehemently opposed slavery and supported the temperance movement and women's suffrage. Beecher Stowe's sister, Isabella Beecher Hooker, was a leading member of the women's rights movement.

In 1860, Hartford was the site of the first "Wide Awakes," abolitionist supporters of Abraham Lincoln. These supporters organized torch-light parades that were both political and social events, often including fireworks and music, in celebration of Lincoln's visit to the city. This type of event caught on and eventually became a staple of mid-to-late-19th century campaigning.

== 20th century ==
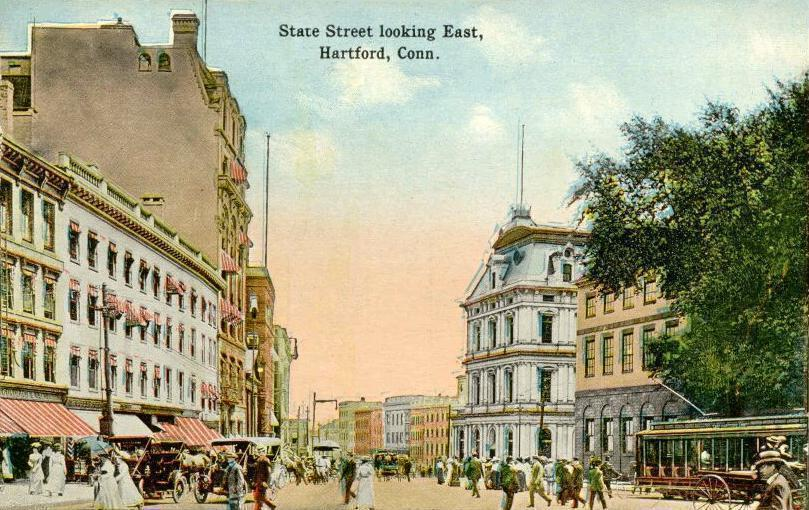
State Street in 1914

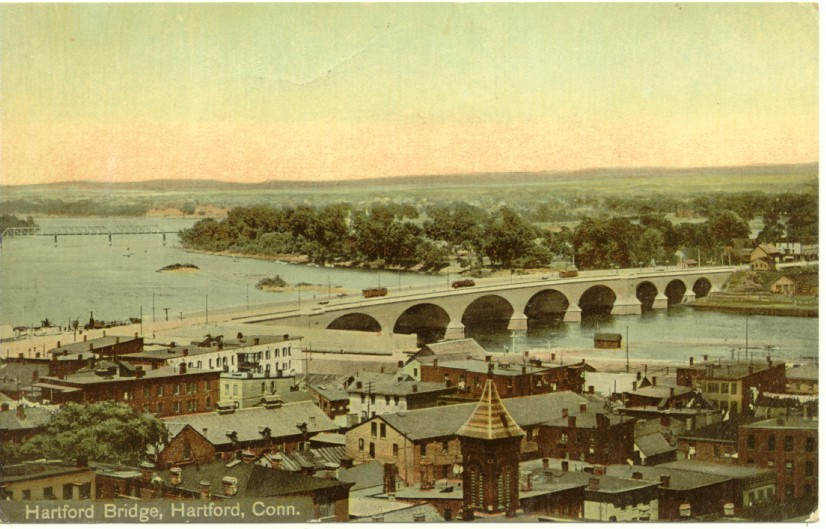
Bulkeley Bridge, circa 1906-1916

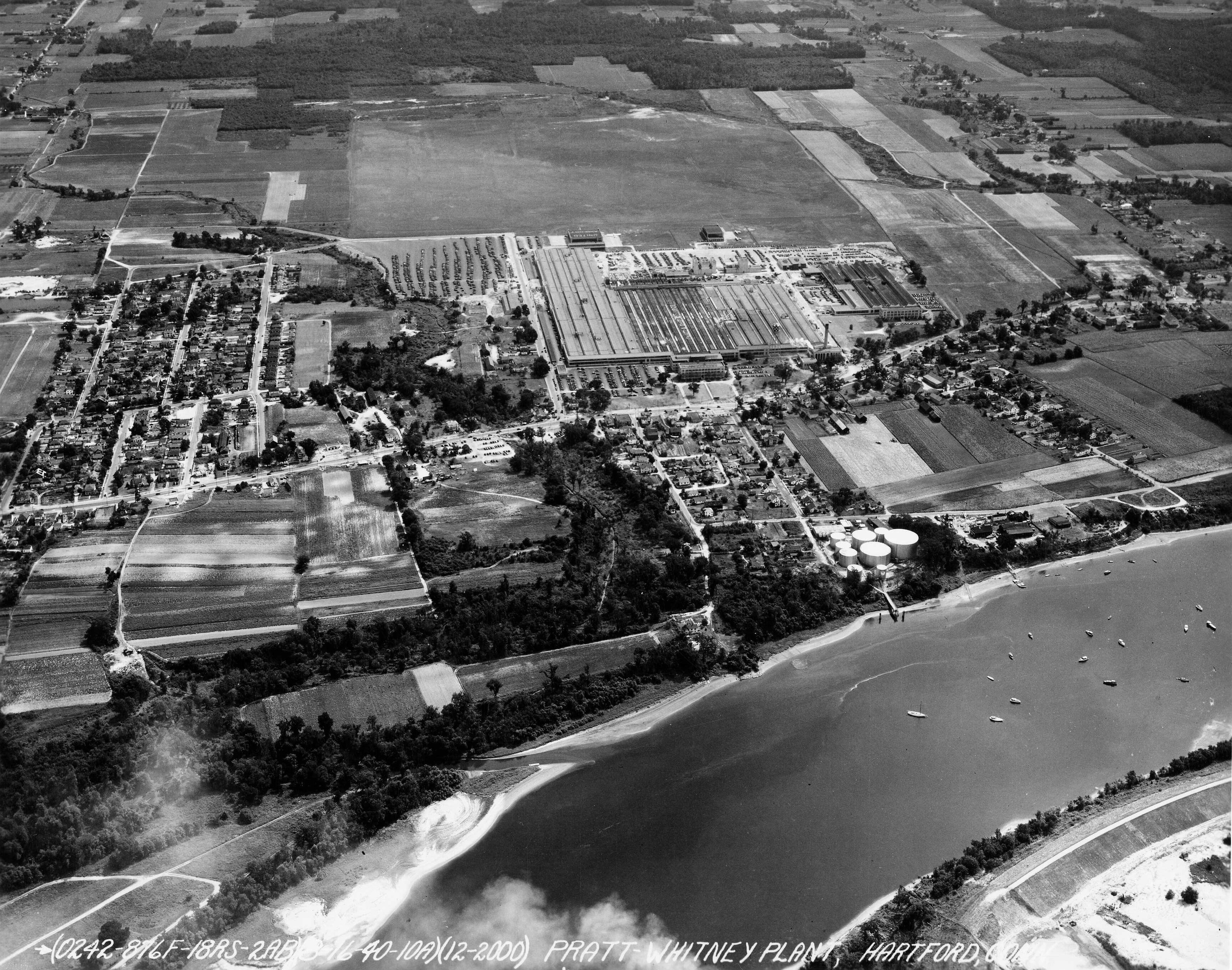
Pratt & Whitney Factory, 1940

On July 6, 1944, Hartford was the scene of one of the worst fire disasters in the history of the United States. The fire, which occurred at a performance of the Ringling Brothers and Barnum and Bailey Circus, became known as the Hartford Circus Fire.

After World War II, many residents of Puerto Rico moved to Hartford and even today Puerto Rican flags can be found on cars and buildings all over the city. Former Hartford Mayor Eddie Pérez was born in Puerto Rico and moved to Hartford in 1969, when he was 12 years old.

Starting in the late 1950s, as the suburbs ringing Hartford began to grow and flourish, the capital city began a long decline. Insurance giant Connecticut General (now CIGNA) moved to a new, modern campus in the suburb of Bloomfield. Constitution Plaza, at first hailed as a model of urban renewal, gradually became a concrete office park. Once-flourishing department stores such as Brown Thompson, Sage-Allen, and G. Fox & Co. all shut down as suburban malls such as Westfarms and The Shoppes at Buckland Hills grew in popularity.

In 1975, Howard Baldwin moved his prospering New England Whalers of the World Hockey Association into the brand new Hartford Civic Center and began play. In 1979, along with the Edmonton Oilers, Quebec Nordiques, and the Winnipeg Jets moved into the National Hockey League. Many great players of hockey played for the Whalers including Gordie Howe, Bobby Hull, Ron Francis, Kevin Dineen, Ulf Samuelsson, Mike Liut, Joel Quenneville, Pat Verbeek, Chris Pronger, Brendan Shanahan, Glen Wesley, and Geoff Sanderson. In 1997, the city lost its professional hockey franchise, the Hartford Whalers, to Raleigh, North Carolina despite an increase in season ticket sales and an offer of a new arena from the state. In 2005, a developer from Newton, Massachusetts attempted to bring an NHL team back to Hartford and house them in a new largely publicly funded stadium. However, As of 2026 the city still lacks a major league sports franchise.

Hartford experienced problems as the population shrank thirteen percent during the 1990s. Only Flint, Michigan; Gary, Indiana; Saint Louis and Baltimore experienced larger population losses during the decade. However, the population has increased since the 2000 Census.

== 21st century ==
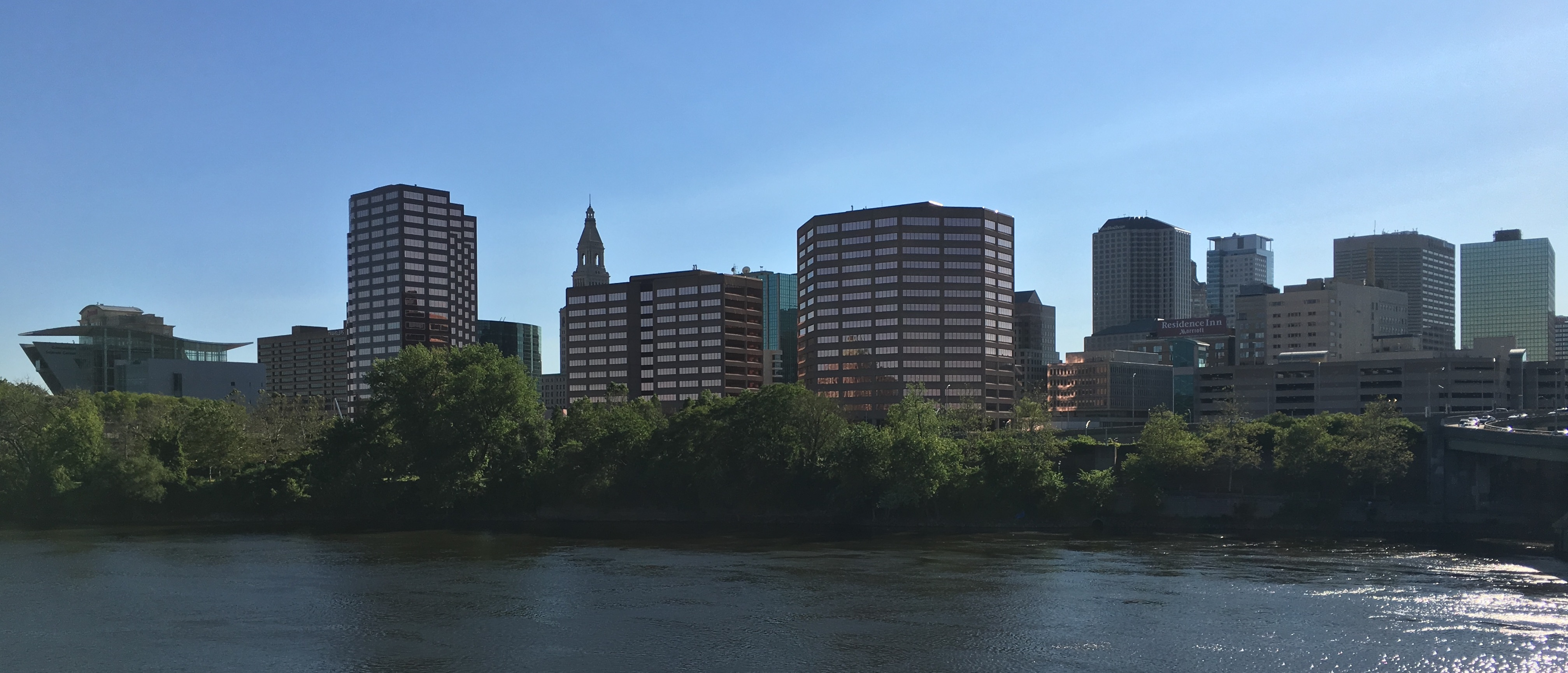
Downtown Hartford in 2019

In the last few years, Hartford has begun to generate renewed interest as many redevelopment projects have been completed, are currently in progress or planned across the city. These initiatives include both commercial and residential projects such as Adriaen's Landing, the Connecticut Science Center, an extensive system of riverfront trails and parks, Park Street and Parkville neighborhood improvements and significant downtown development. The historic Colt building and complex is also being renovated to National Park standards.

== See also ==
- Timeline of Hartford, Connecticut
- Education in Connecticut
- History of Connecticut

== Bibliography ==
- Chen, Xiangming, ed. Confronting Urban Legacy: Rediscovering Hartford and New England's Forgotten Cities (2015) excerpt
- Cruz, José E. "A Decade of Change: Puerto Rican Politics in Hartford, Connecticut, 1969-1979." Journal of American Ethnic History (1997): 45-80. online
- Dalin, David G. and Jonathan Rosenbaum. Making a Life, Building a Community: A History of the Jews of Hartford (Holmes & Meier, 1997) online review
- Lazarus, Barry A. "The practice of medicine and prejudice in a New England town: the founding of Mount Sinai Hospital, Hartford, Connecticut." Journal of American Ethnic History (1991): 21-41. online
- Love, William DeLoss. The Colonial History of Hartford (Centinel Hill Press, 1974).
- Schlichting, Kurt, Peter Tuckel, and Richard Maisel. "Great migration of African Americans to Hartford, Connecticut, 1910–1930: A GIS analysis at the neighborhood and street level." Social Science History 39.2 (2015): 287-310. online
- Simmons, Louise. Organizing in hard times: Labor and neighborhoods in Hartford (Temple University Press, 2010).
- Simmons, Louise B. "A new urban conservatism: The case of Hartford, Connecticut." Journal of Urban Affairs 20.2 (1998): 175-198.
- Sterner, Daniel. A Guide to Historic Hartford, Connecticut (Arcadia Publishing, 2012) online.
- Trumbull, James Hammond, ed. The Memorial History of Hartford County, Connecticut, 1633-1884 (1886) online.
- Tuckel, Peter, et al. "The diffusion of the influenza pandemic of 1918 in Hartford, Connecticut." Social Science History 30.2 (2006): 167-196. online
- Valocchi, Steve. "History, Memory, and the City: Life Stories of Growing Up in Hartford, Connecticut During the Great Depression." Connecticut History Review 41.1 (2002): 41-67. online
- Walsh, Andrew. "Hartford: A global history." in Confronting urban legacy: Rediscovering Hartford and New England’s forgotten cities (2013): 21-45.
- Woodward, Walter W. "New England's Other Witch-Hunt: The Hartford Witch-Hunt of the 1660s and Changing Patterns in Witchcraft Prosecution." OAH Magazine of History 17.4 (2003): 16-20. online
- Samuel Moody, Founding Family Hartford. The Genealogy of Moody - Lapoint. Online
