= Johnson baronets of New York (1755) =

Escutcheon of the Johnson baronets of New York

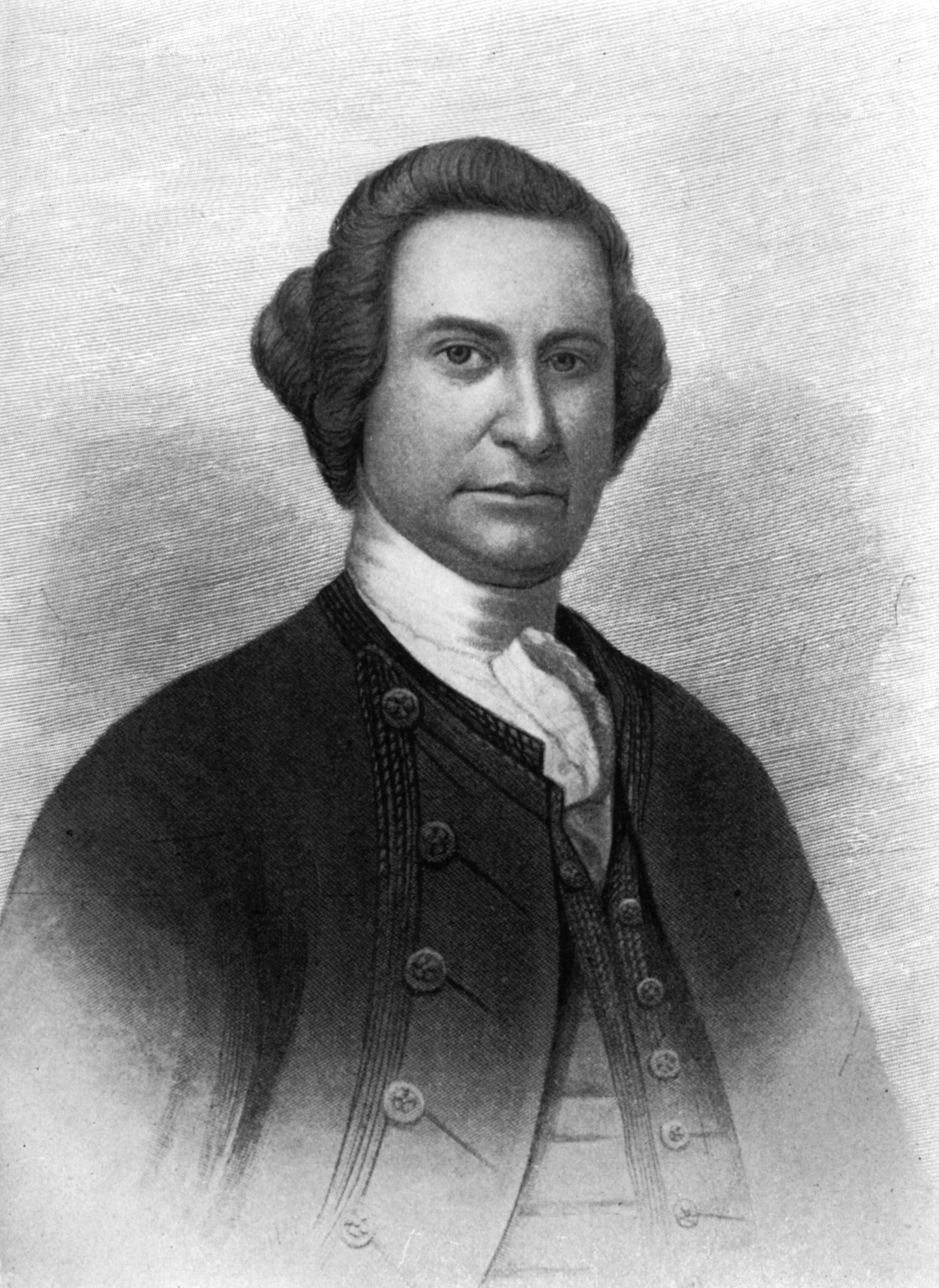
Sir William Johnson, 1st Baronet, of New York, 1763

The Johnson baronetcy, of New York in North America, was created in the Baronetage of Great Britain on 27 November 1755 for the soldier William Johnson. The baronetcy was awarded for his victories at Crown Point (see capture of Fort Ticonderoga) and the Battle of Lake George earlier that year. His birth surname was MacShane (Irish: Mac Seáin), of which Johnson is a translation.

== Johnson baronets of New York (1755) ==
- Sir William Johnson, 1st Baronet (1715–1774).
- Sir John Johnson, 2nd Baronet (1742–1830) was a loyalist leader during the American Revolution. He married Mary Nicoll Watts, daughter of John Watts (1715–1789).
- Sir Adam Gordon Johnson, 3rd Baronet (1781–1843)
- Sir William George Johnson, 4th Baronet (1830–1908)
- Sir Edward Gordon Johnson, 5th Baronet (1867–1957)
- Sir John Paley Johnson, 6th Baronet (1907–1975)
- Sir Peter Colpoys Paley Johnson, 7th Baronet (1930–2003)
- Sir (Colpoys) Guy Johnson, 8th Baronet (born 1965)

The heir apparent is Colpoys William Johnson (born 1993).

== Extended family ==
Guy Johnson, nephew of the 1st Baronet, was a distinguished soldier. The son Colonel Charles Christopher Johnson of the 2nd Baronet was father of John Ormsby Johnson, who became a vice-admiral.

== Notes ==
Baronetage of Great Britain
Preceded by Cavendish baronets	Johnson baronets of New York; 27 November 1755	Succeeded by White baronets
