= Molly Brant =

Canadian aboriginal leader (c.1736–1796)

- "The Three Faces of Molly Brant" (Iroquois, European, Loyalist): 1986 design used by Canada Post in a commemorative postage stamp
- Born: c. 1736; Canajoharie on the south bank of the Mohawk River, or Ohio River Valley
- Died: April 16, 1796 (aged 60–61); Kingston, Upper Canada
- Resting place: St. Paul's Anglican Church, Kingston
- Other names: Mary Brant, Konwatsiʼtsiaiénni, Degonwadonti
- Spouse: Sir William Johnson (m. 1759; died 1774)
- Children: 8
- Relatives: Joseph Brant (brother)

Molly Brant (c. 1736 – April 16, 1796), also known as Mary Brant, Konwatsiʼtsiaiénni, and Degonwadonti, was a Mohawk leader in British New York and Upper Canada in the era of the American Revolution. Living in the Province of New York, she was the consort of Sir William Johnson, the British Superintendent of Indian Affairs, with whom she had eight children. Joseph Brant, who became a Mohawk leader and war chief, was her younger brother.

After Johnson's death in 1774, Brant and her children left Johnson Hall in Johnstown, New York, and returned to her native village of Canajoharie, further west on the Mohawk River. A Loyalist during the American Revolutionary War, she migrated to British Canada, where she served as an intermediary between British officials and the Haudenosaunee. After the war, she settled in what is now Kingston, Ontario. In recognition of her service to the Crown, the British government gave Brant a pension and compensated her for her wartime losses, including a grant of land. When the British ceded their former colonial territory to the United States, most of the Haudenosaunee nations were forced out of New York. A Six Nations Reserve was established in what is now Ontario.

Since 1994, Brant has been honored as a Person of National Historic Significance in Canada. She was long ignored or disparaged by historians of the United States, but scholarly interest in her increased in the late 20th century. She has sometimes been controversial, criticized for being pro-British at the expense of the Haudenosaunee. Known to have been a devout Anglican, she is commemorated on April 16 in the calendar of the Anglican Church of Canada. No portraits of her are known to exist; an idealized likeness is featured on a statue in Kingston and on a Canadian stamp issued in 1986.

== Early life ==
Little is known for certain about Molly Brant's early life. Named Mary, but commonly known as "Molly", she was born around 1736, possibly in the Mohawk village of Canajoharie, or perhaps further west in the Ohio Country. Her parents were Christian Mohawks. French Jesuit missionaries had converted many Mohawk to Catholicism in their early colonial years. By the mid-18th century, however, English influence had grown in New York. Christian Mohawk tended to realign as Anglicans. Brant may have been the child named Mary who was christened at the chapel at Fort Hunter, near the Lower Castle, another Mohawk village, on April 13, 1735. If so, her parents were named Margaret and Cannassware. Most historians believe that her father was named Peter. Joseph Brant, born in 1743, was Molly's brother or half-brother.

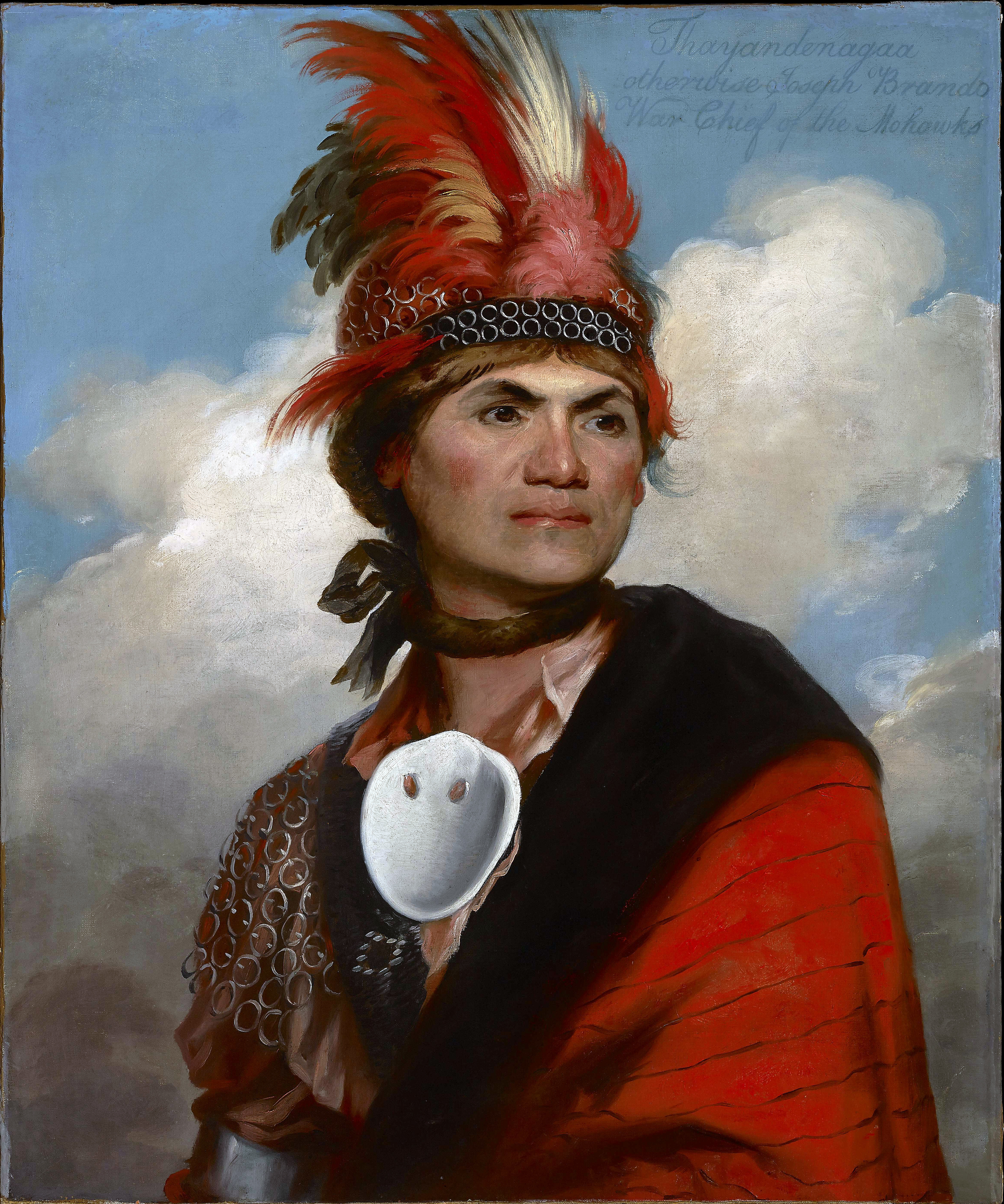
Joseph Brant, Molly's younger brother, in 1786

One of Molly's Mohawk names, perhaps her birth name, was Konwatsiʼtsiaiénni, which means "Someone Lends Her a Flower". Her other Mohawk name, given to her at adulthood in a customary mark of passage, was Degonwadonti, meaning "Two Against One". Her Mohawk names have been spelled in a variety of ways in historical records.

The Mohawk are one of the Six Nations of the Haudenosaunee League and occupied the most eastern territory of the confederacy. At the time of the American Revolutionary War, they lived primarily in the Mohawk River valley in what is now upstate New York, west of what developed as colonial Albany and Schenectady. At some point, either before or after her birth, Molly's family moved west to the Ohio Country, which the Haudenosaunee had reserved as a hunting ground since the late 17th century.

After Molly's father died, her family returned to Canajoharie. On September 9, 1753, Molly's mother married Brant Kanagaradunkwa, a Mohawk royaner of the Turtle clan. (Note: The name of Molly's stepfather is sometimes given as "Nickus Brant". According to Kelsay, this is an error stemming from a 19th-century historian's conflation of Brant Kanagaradunkwa with two other Mohawk. (Kelsay 1984)" 666n5") Possibly to reinforce their connection to Brant Kanagaradunkwa, who was a prominent leader, Molly and Joseph took their stepfather's name as a surname, which was unusual for that time.

Molly Brant was raised in a Mohawk culture that had absorbed some influences from their Dutch and English trading partners during a period of extended contact. In Canajoharie, the Brants lived in a substantial colonial-style frame house and used many European household goods. The family attended the Church of England. Molly was fluent in Mohawk and English. It is not clear whether she was formally educated or whether she could read and write. There are several letters signed "Mary Brant", but these may have been dictated by Molly and written by someone else. A letter from 1782 is signed with "her mark", indicating that she may have been only semi-literate.

In 1754, Molly accompanied her stepfather and a delegation of Mohawk elders to Philadelphia, where the men were to discuss a fraudulent land sale with colonial leaders. The party traveled to Albany, where an English officer, Captain Staats Long Morris, nephew of Governor Lewis Morris of Pennsylvania, met and fell in love with Brant. She was then about nineteen years old and described as "pretty likely", meaning "good looking".

== Consort of Sir William ==
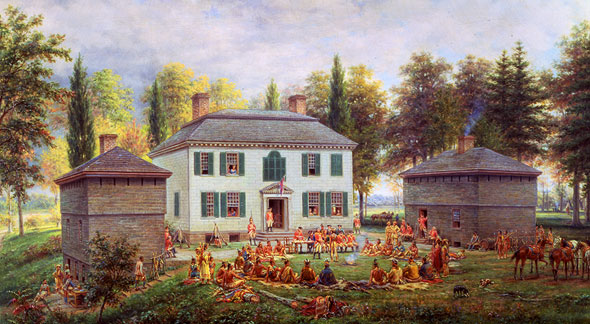
Johnson Hall, Molly Brant's home from 1763 to 1774

When General Sir William Johnson, Superintendent for Northern Indian Affairs, visited Canajoharie, he always stayed at the house of his friend, Molly's stepfather Brant Kanagaradunkwa. Shortly after Johnson's first common-law wife, Catherine Weisenberg, died, Brant moved into Fort Johnson. Johnson and Molly Brant became intimate; in September 1759, she gave birth to his son, Peter Warren Johnson, named for Sir William's early patron and uncle, Admiral Sir Peter Warren. Brant lived with Johnson at Fort Johnson, and then his personal residence of Johnson Hall after 1763, when the British had defeated the French in the Seven Years' War. (It was known on the North American front as the French and Indian War. The Haudenosaunee had mostly allied with the British during this war.)

Brant was effectively Sir William's common-law wife or consort. Brant played a prominent role in the life of Fort Johnson, managing household purchases, from expensive china to sewing supplies. The couple had nine children together, eight of whom lived past infancy. They included the following:

- Peter Warren Johnson (named after William Johnson's uncle), served in the 26th Regiment of Foot during the American Revolutionary War and was killed in 1777;
- Six daughters, Elizabeth, Magdalene, Margaret, Mary, Susanna, and Ann (also known as Nancy). Elizabeth married Dr. Robert Kerr, a British physician and magistrate. Magdalene married John Ferguson, who was elected as a member of the Legislature of Upper Canada for Kingston. Ann (also known as Nancy) married a naval officer, Captain Hugh Early, for whom Earl Street in Kingston is named. Margaret married Captain George Farley of the 24th Regiment in Kingston. Mary did not marry. She lived in Kingston with her sister, Magdalene, after the war. Susanna married Lieutenant Henry Lemoine of the 60th Regiment of Foot.
- George Johnson.

In Johnson's will, Molly is referred to as his "housekeeper", which at the time meant that she ran the household, served as hostess, and supervised the female servants and slaves. According to the historian Barbara Graymont, "Molly Brant presided over Johnson's household with intelligence, ability, grace, and charm, and she effectively managed the estate during Johnson's many and prolonged absences." Johnson and Brant's relationship was public; she received gifts and thank-you notes from prominent visitors such as Lord Adam Gordon. Johnson used his connection with Brant to further his public and private dealings with the Mohawk and other Haudenosaunee nations. Brant's role as Johnson's domestic and political partner was well known. "Before the age of forty," writes Feister and Pulis, "she was already a legendary figure...."

William Johnson died in July 1774. In his will he left a total of 25,000 acres of land, in addition to money and slaves to Brant and their children; He left Johnson Hall to John Johnson, his eldest son by his first common-law wife, Catherine Weisenberg, a Palatine German immigrant. Molly returned to Canajoharie with her children, personal belongings, and slaves. There she lived a comfortable life in a large house, and prospered as a fur trader.

== American Revolution ==
Brant supported the British Crown during the American Revolutionary War. From her home in Canajoharie, she provided food and assistance to Loyalists who were fleeing from New York to Canada. Despite harassment from local Patriots, she remained at Canajoharie for the first two years of the war.

A turning point came in 1777 when British forces invaded New York from Canada and laid siege to Patriots in Fort Stanwix. In August, when Brant learned that a large body of Patriot militia was on its way to relieve the fort, she sent Kanien'kéha:ka runners to alert the British commander of the danger. This information enabled a British, Kanien'kéha:ka, and Seneca force to ambush the Patriots and their Oneida allies in the Battle of Oriskany. The Haudenosaunee were divided in their loyalties. The Oneida allied with the Patriots, while most bands of the other four nations allied with the British. After this battle, in which Haudenosaunee warriors of these nations fought on both sides, the war in the Mohawk Valley became particularly brutal. The Oneida and rebel Americans retaliated against Brant by pillaging Canajoharie. Brant fled with her children to Onondaga, the central city of the Haudenosaunee Confederacy. Her departure was so precipitate that she had to leave most of her belongings behind.

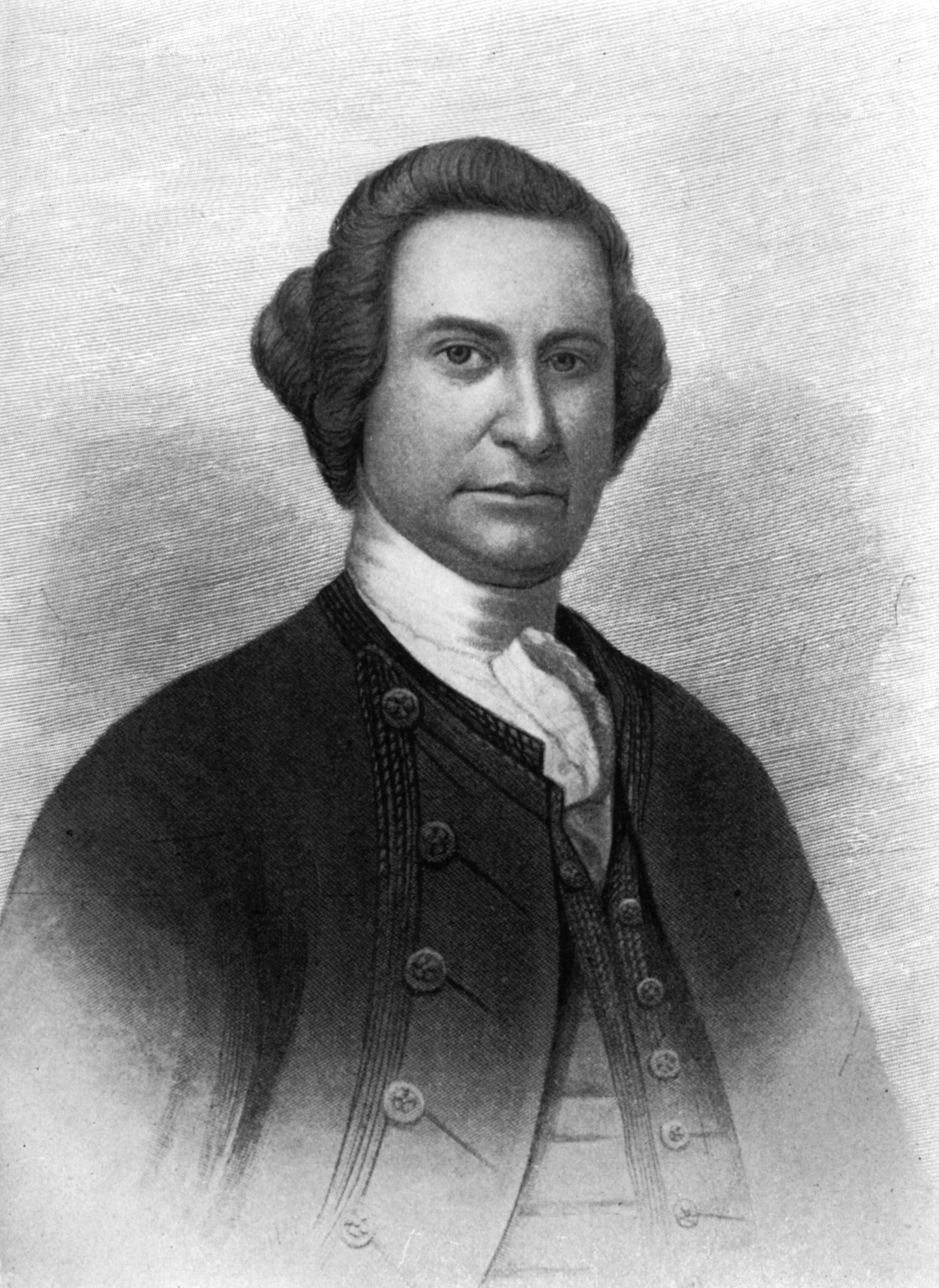
Sir William Johnson in 1763. Molly Brant continued his work of sustaining the Anglo-Haudenosaunee alliance.

At Onondaga, the leaders of the Haudenosaunee nations held a council to discuss what course to take. Most of the nations and their leaders favored assisting the British, but after the Battle of Saratoga, it seemed unlikely that the British could win. Sayenqueraghta, a Seneca chief, urged the nations to withdraw from the war. Brant criticized Sayenqueraghta's advice, invoking the memory of Sir William to convince the council to remain loyal to the Crown. According to Daniel Claus, a British Indian agent and Sir William's son-in-law, Brant was "in every respect considered and esteemed by them [the Iroqouis] as Sir William's Relict [i.e. widow], and one word from her is more taken notice of by the Five Nations than a thousand from any white man without exception".

Much of Brant's influence came from her connections to Sir William Johnson and her stepfather Brant Kanagaradunkwa. Additional influence came from the fact that women in Haudenosaunee society had more political influence than did women in patriarchal societies. Under the Haudenosaunee matrilineal kinship system, inheritance and social status were passed through the maternal line. Women elders influenced the selection of chiefs. Because Brant's ancestry is unclear, historians have apparently disagreed about whether she was born into an influential clan. Brant has been described as the "head of the Six Nations matrons", although historian Robert Allen writes that "there is no substantive evidence to suggest that Molly was ever a clan matron or mother within the Iroquois matrilineal society". Fiester and Pulis write that "although not born to the position, she became one of the Mohawk matrons".

In late 1777, Brant relocated to Fort Niagara at the request of Major John Butler, who wanted to make use of her influence among the Haudenosaunee. At Niagara, Brant worked as an intermediary between the British and the Haudenosaunee, rendering, according to Graymont, "inestimable assistance there as a diplomat and stateswoman". Meanwhile, in November 1777 Brant's son Peter Johnson was killed in the Philadelphia campaign while serving in the British 26th Regiment of Foot.

In 1779, Brant visited Montreal, where some of her children attended school. She returned to Fort Niagara when the Americans began their Sullivan Expedition that year. In retaliation for attacks in Cherry Valley, the expedition attacked 40 Seneca and other Haudenosaunee villages throughout central western New York, destroying crops and winter stores. Because of the war, Brant could get only as far as the British post at Carleton Island, where many Haudenosaunee refugees had fled from the Americans. There she continued her work as an intermediary. The British commander considered Brant's influence "far superior to that of all their Chiefs put together". Brant was unhappy with having to live in an army barracks with her children. Hoping to keep her favor, the British built her a house on the island in 1781, where she lived with her children and four slaves for the remainder of the war. Throughout the war, Brant played important roles as a negotiator, mediator, liaison, and advocate for Mohawk and Haudenosaunee peoples at Fort Niagara, Montreal, and Carleton Island.

== Final years ==
When the British largely abandoned Carleton Island in 1783, Brant moved to Cataraqui, now Kingston, Ontario. There the British government built her a house and gave her an annual pension of £100. She was assigned Farm Lot A in Kingston Township, along the northern limit of the town. It was 116 acres, instead of the standard 200 acres, because it was encroached upon by the Clergy Reserve. In addition, Brant and her family received compensation from the British government for their losses in the American Revolution. Hoping to make use of her influence, the United States offered Brant compensation if she would return with her family to the Mohawk Valley, but she refused. The New York legislature ruled that Brant and her children as Indians could not own the 15,000 acres of land bequeathed to them by Sir William Johnson, and said it legally belonged to his heir, Sir John Johnson. He was under the 1779 Act of Attainder, so the property reverted to the state. New York sold it to settlers and speculators.

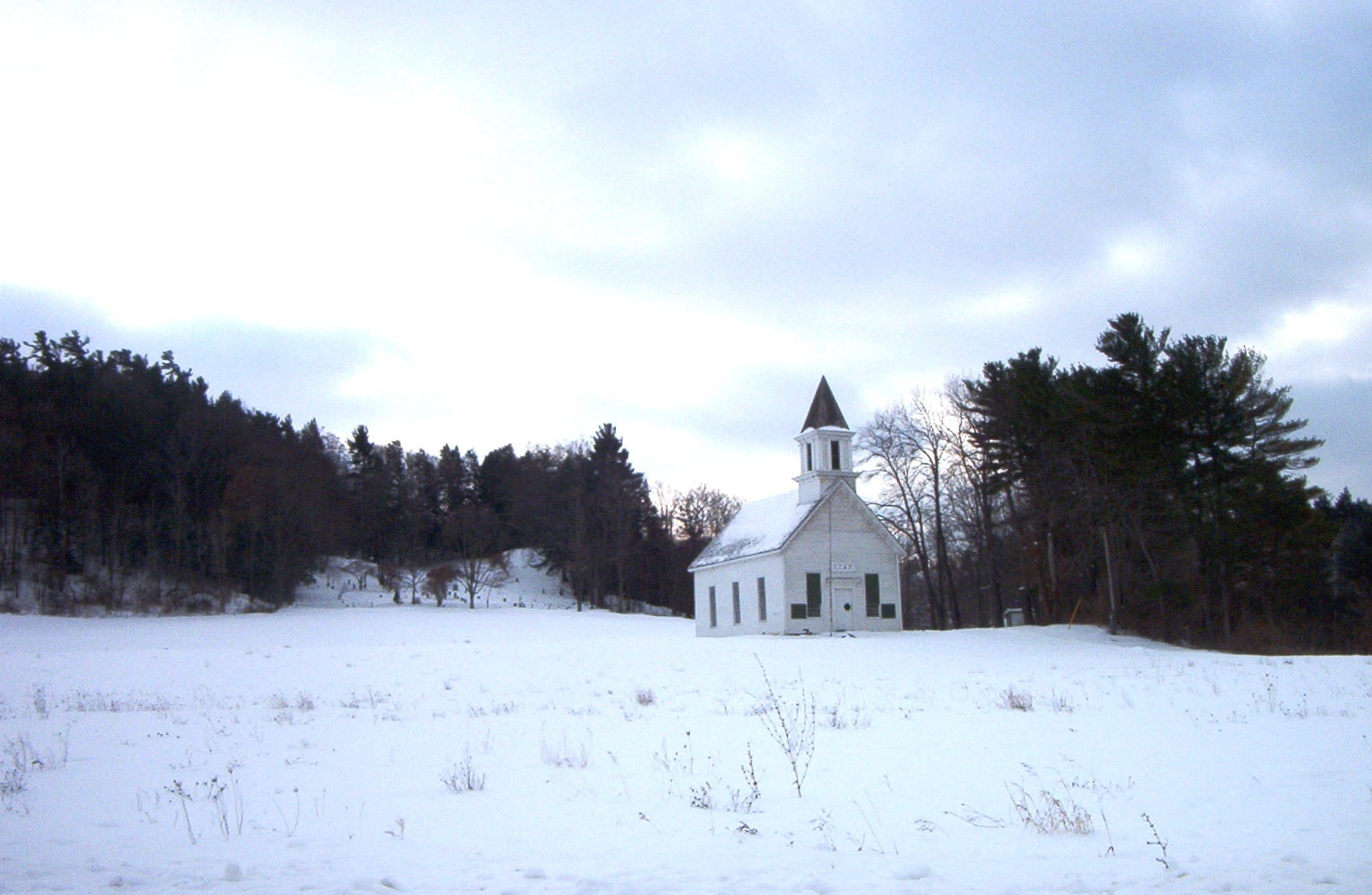
Indian Castle Church is the only building still standing that was associated with the Mohawk at Canajoharie. It was erected in 1769 by Sir William Johnson on land donated by Molly and her brother Joseph Brant.

Brant lived in Kingston for the remainder of her life, a respected member of the community and a charter member of the local Anglican Church. Her son George Johnson, known as "Big George" among Natives, married a Haudenosaunee woman and became a farmer and teacher. Her daughters married prominent white men.

Brant died in Kingston on April 16, 1796, at about age 60, and was buried in St. Paul's Churchyard, the settlement's first burial ground. This was later developed as the site of St. Paul's Anglican Church. The exact location of her grave is unknown.

== Legacy ==
Brant's legacy is varied. Since 1994, she has been honored in Canada as a Person of National Historic Significance. Brant was long ignored or disparaged by historians of the United States, but scholarly interest in her increased in the late 20th century with a better understanding of her role and influence in Haudenosaunee society. The Johnson Hall State Historic Site in New York includes presentation and interpretation of her public and private roles for visitors.

She has sometimes been controversial, criticized for being pro-British at the expense of the Haudenosaunee. According to Feister and Pulis, "She made choices for which she is sometimes criticized today; some have seen her as having played a large part in the loss of Haudenosaunee land in New York State." But like many of the male leaders, Brant believed that the Mohawk and other Haudenosaunee nations' best chance of survival lay with the British. She identified first as Mohawk and made strategic choices that she believed would best benefit her peoples.

Brant is commemorated on April 16 in the calendar of the Anglican Church of Canada,. No portraits of her are known to exist; an idealized likeness is featured on a statue in Kingston and on a Canadian stamp issued in 1986.

She was portrayed by Tantoo Cardinal in the 1990 television film Divided Loyalties.

== Archaeology ==
In 1988, archaeological testing was conducted at the site of the former home of Molly Brant in Kingston to prepare for a construction project. Salvage excavations were carried out in 1989. Much of the original site of the Brant homestead had already been disturbed by industrial activities.

The area had long been the site of the Kiwanis Playing Field, and was not disturbed until Imperial Oil bought the property in 1938. At this time, the below-ground remains of the structures were likely removed. Excavations revealed the remains of a privy, which contained more than 5,000 artifacts of domestic and personal items from the 19th century.

== Recognition in Kingston ==
On August 25, 1996, the City of Kingston proclaimed Molly Brant Commemoration Day. The Mohawk Nation - Bay of Quinte, the Corporation of the City of Kingston, the City of Kingston Historical Board, and the Historic Sites and Monuments Board of Canada had agreed to commemorate her life with the creation of a bust representing Molly Brant, along with an historic monument at the front entrance of Rideaucrest Home on Rideau Street in Kingston. John Boxtel was commissioned to make the bust. The memorial sculpture was unveiled at Rideaucrest on Molly Brant Commemoration Day. The commemoration began with a service at St. George's Cathedral, a traditional Mohawk tobacco burning and a wreath-laying ceremony at St. Paul's Anglican Church, and a reception at Rideaucrest. The sculpture of Molly Brant was unveiled in the eastern courtyard.

The Molly Brant One Woman Opera, composed by Augusta Cecconi-Bates, was first performed at St. George's Cathedral in Kingston on April 25, 2003, under the aegis of the Cataraqui Archaeological Research Foundation. The 2003 production was sung by Kingston soprano Rhona Gale, with Carrie Wyatt, flute, and the composer at the piano. The opera has since been developed into a full four acts.

On June 17, 2015, Limestone District School Board trustees selected Molly Brant as the name for a new elementary public school located on Lyons Street on Queen Elizabeth Collegiate property.

== Bibliography ==
- Allen, Robert S. (1999). "Molly Brant". In Garraty, John A.; Carnes, Mark C. (eds.). American National Biography. Vol. 3. New York: Oxford University Press. pp. 432–434. ISBN 0-19-512782-X.
- Bazely, Susan M. (September 17, 1996). "Archaeology on the Brant Property". Cataraqui Archeological Research Foundation. Archived from the original on April 28, 2011.
- "Molly Brant". Cataraqui Archaeological Research Foundation. Archived from the original on July 15, 2015.
- Cecconi-Bates, Augusta (December 4, 2008). "Molly of the Mohawks".
- Feister, Lois M.; Pulis, Bonnie (1996). "Molly Brant: Her Domestic and Political Roles in Eighteenth-Century New York". In Grumet, Robert S. (ed.). Northeastern Indian Lives, 1632–1816. Amherst, Massachusetts: University of Massachusetts Press. pp. 295–320. ISBN 1-55849-001-9.
- Graymont, Barbara (1972). The Iroquois in the American Revolution. Syracuse, New York: Syracuse University Press. ISBN 0-8156-0083-6.
- Graymont, Barbara (1979). "Koñwatsiãtsiaiéñni". Dictionary of Canadian Biography. Vol. IV (1771-1800). Toronto, Ontario: University of Toronto Press.
- Gross, Judith (Spring 1999). "Molly Brant: Textual Representations of Cultural Midwifery". American Studies. 40 (1): 23–40. Archived from the original on July 20, 2011.
- Jackson, David. "Molly Brant Foundation report on the 1996 commemoration of Molly Brant". Molly Brant Foundation. Archived from the original on June 13, 2013.
- Kelsay, Isabel Thompson (1984). Joseph Brant, 1743–1807, Man of Two Worlds. Syracuse, New York: Syracuse University Press. ISBN 0-8156-0182-4.
- McKenna, Katherine M.J. (2000). "Mary Brant (Konwatsi'tsiaienni Degonwadonti): 'Miss Molly,' Feminist Role Model or Mohawk Princess?". In Rhoden, Nancy L.; Steele, Ian K. (eds.). The Human Tradition in the American Revolution. Wilmington, Delaware: Scholarly Resources. pp. 183–201. ISBN 0-8420-2748-3.
- "Brant, Molly (Tekonwatonti) National Historic Person". Directory of Federal Heritage Designations. Parks Canada. March 15, 2012.
- Paxton, James (2008). Joseph Brant and his world 18th century Mohawk Warrior and Statesman. Toronto: James Lormier and Company. ISBN 978-1-55277-023-8.
- Pearson, Ellen Holmes. "The Fighting Canadiens". Teachinghistory.org.
- Sivertsen, Barbara J. (1996). Turtles, Wolves, and Bears: A Mohawk Family History. Westminster, Maryland: Heritage Books. ISBN 978-0-7884-0484-9.
- Smith, Karen (June 17, 2015). "New Kingston elementary school to be named Molly Brant Elementary School" (Press release). Kingston, Ontario: Limestone District School Board. Archived from the original on July 16, 2015.
- Snow, Dean R. (1994). The Iroquois. Cambridge, Massachusetts: Blackwell. p. 149. ISBN 1-55786-225-7.
