= Hendrick Theyanoguin =

Mohawk leader (c. 1691–1755)

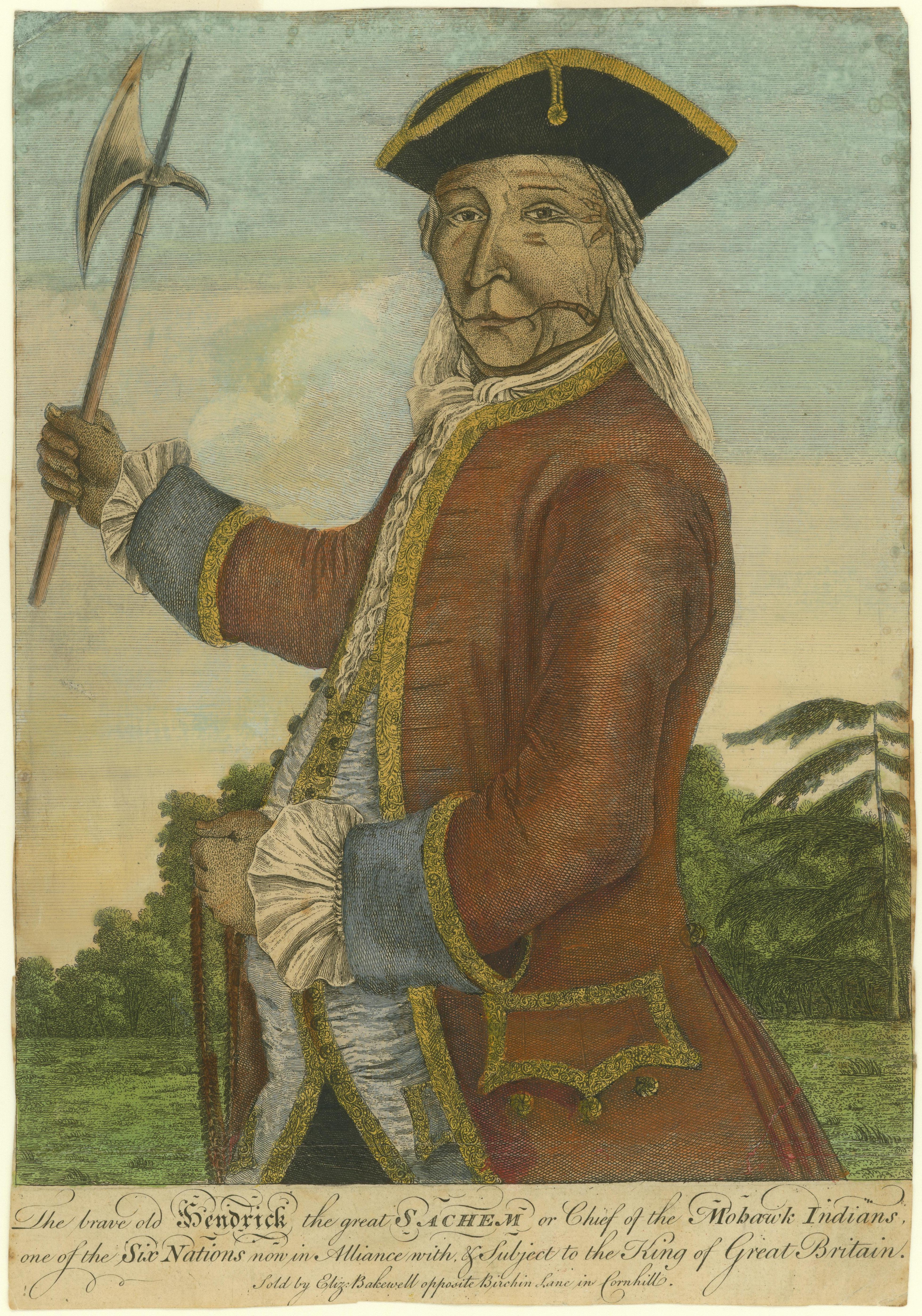
- 1755 portrait

Royaner of the Mohawk Bear Clan

Personal details
- Born: March 28, 1692 Westfield, Massachusetts Bay Colony
- Died: September 8, 1755 (aged 64) near Lake George, Province of New York

Military service
- Allegiance: Haudenosaunee Confederacy
- Battles/wars: King George's War; Seven Years' War; French and Indian War; Battle of Lake George †

Hendrick Theyanoguin (March 28, 1692 – September 8, 1755) was a prominent Mohawk royaner, member of the Bear Clan, and speaker for the Mohawk Council. He was a key figure in the French and Indian Wars, forming a close relationship with Sir William Johnson, helping defend the Anglo-Haudenosaunee (Six Nations) alliance before his death at the Battle of Lake George.

Until the late 20th century, Theyanoguin's biography was mistakenly conflated with an earlier Mohawk royaner of the Wolf Clan, Hendrick Tejonihokarawa, as both were known as 'Hendrick Peters' across English sources.

== Early life ==
Hendrick Theyanoguin (alternatively spelled Theyanooguin, Thoyanogyen, or Tiyanoga) was born March 28, 1692 in Westfield, Massachusetts, to a Mohawk noblewoman and a Mohawk royaner ("sachem"). The Mohawks matrilineal system of kingship meant he was born into his mother's Bear Clan. In childhood, Theyanoguin was known as "Long Bow," before becoming known as 'Hendrick,' possibly upon his conversion to Christianity, the English referring to him as 'Hendrick' or 'Henry Peters.' Although it is unclear when Theyanoguin was baptised, on the 3rd of February 1745, Moravian missionary David Zeisberger noted he was baptised. The French would later refer to him as 'Tête Blanche' for his white hair. In 1710, Theyanoguin inherited his royaner title 'Saquainquaragton.'

During King George's War (1744–48), Theyanoguin became a prominent figure in the emerging Anglo-Haudenosaunee fur-trading community Canajoharie 'Upper Village,' on the South Bank of the Mohawk River. It is here that Theyanoguin met merchant and landowner Sir William Johnson, and began to exchange gifts with him, establishing a close relationship as a Mohawk spokesperson that would be influential upon Johnson's appointment as Indian Agent in 1746.

Hendrick's name appears more than any other indigenous American in Johnson's accounts, evidence that he received a pair of boots, a laced coat, medicine, money, and numerous 'private presents,' including entertainments for his warriors and relatives. Theyanoguin worked to maintain a neutral trading stance, in order to preserve Mohawk and Hudenosaunee interests in the Oswego fur-trade. Rather, he became aware that the Mohawks could act as intermediaries between the English and the French.

== Colonial diplomat ==
By 1753, Theyanoguin was becoming increasingly concerned that the Covenant Chain was broken, and became a mouthpiece for Mohawk dissatisfaction at fraudulent land patents, a dangerous rum trade, and the pull of migration to Canada. Secondary sources claim that Theyanoguin travelled to England around 1740, and was given an audience by George II during which he was presented with a green coat and cocked hat, which Theyanoguin would wear during a sitting for a now lost portrait. However, such little evidence remains that Theyanoguin ever made such a journey.

On the 27th and 28 June 1744, New York Governor George Clinton and commissioners from Massachusetts and Connecticut met a Mohawk delegation under Hendrick in Albany to renew the Covenant Chain, and inform the Haudenosaunee of war with France, breaking the neutrality of the Six Nations. One month later, Hendrick led a delegation to Boston, to meet Governor William Shirley, who advised the Mohawks to resist alliances with the French to disrupt Anglo-Indigenous trade. In July 1745, Pennsylvanian frontier diplomat Conrad Weiser visited Canajoharie, where Theyanoguin complained to him about the Albany Indian Commissioners failures: "They have Cheated Us out of our Land, Bribed our Chiefs to sign Deeds for them, and treat Us as Slaves."

In October that year, Theyanoguin attended a second conference in Albany held by Clinton, where he gifted the Mohawk delegation a belt, urging their support against the French, amid rumours that the British were preparing to attack the Mohawks. 462 Haudenosaunee attended, of which 163 were Mohawks. Contemporaries saw this conferences as a means through which the Haudenosaunee could enrich themselves; Clinton surmising it was a "a device of their own contrivance in order to induce this as well as the neighbouring Governments to give them presents this year as they did the last."

In 1746, Sir William Johnson was appointed 'Colonel over the Six Nations,' replacing the Albany Indian Commissions as the Crown's sole agent to the Haudenosaunee. Later that year, Theyanoguin led a delegation of 46 Mohawks to a conference with the Governor of New France, Charles de la Boische, Marquis de Beauharnois, in Montreal. However, on their return journey, raided the Isle La Motte and attacked French Carpenters, killing one and taking another prisoner before returning to Albany. In the spring of 1747, Theyanoguin led a war party to the St. Lawrence River, which was repulsed by the French, and attempts to capture Theyanoguin were unsuccessful.

In 1751, William Johnson resigned as Indian agent after the British Government failed to reimburse him for his work. In July that year, Theyanoguin spoke alongside Johnson, Clinton and Wieser suggesting that Catholic Mohawks were receiving better treatment than those unconverted. In 1753 Theyanoguin made a speech to Clinton saying: "Brother, by and by you will expect to see the Nations (the Six Nations of the Haudenosaunee) down here" (i.e. in New York). Contemporary newspapers and broadsheets made much of the fear of this threat.

He was also present at the 1754 Albany Congress, where he delivered a speech alongside Benjamin Franklin's proposal for the Albany Plan. On January 7, 1755, Theyanoguin arrived in Philadelphia on the invitation of Governor Robert Hunter Morris, returning in May 1755 with assurances that Pennsylvania would recognise Mohawk land claims.

== French and Indian War ==
When Albany was threatened by French attack, Theyanoguin led over 200 Mohawks down the Hudson Valley in his expedition to Crown Point and Fort Edward to assist William Johnson. Theyanoguin was however concerned about the possibility of fighting Catholic and Canadian Mohawks, arranging a meeting with French forces on the 4th of September, 1755.

Theyanoguin led 300 Mohawks at the Battle of Lake George on September 8, 1755, acting as a translater between Indian Scouts and Johnson: claiming "If they [his men] are to fight they are too few; if they are to be killed they are too many." Theyanoguin was killed in an attempted surprise attack south of Lake George while riding one of Johnson's horses, which he did as he was growing too old and corpulent to travel on foot. The horse was shot out from under him, leaving him to be bayonetted. He was one of two Mohawk royaner killed in the action. In vengeance for his death, Mohawks presented Johnson with a French scalp in 1758 to 'replace' Theyanguin.

== Legacy ==
Theyanoguin had a son, Sahonwadie 'Young Hendrick,' who later settled in Canajoharie, and a brother Abraham who frequently joined him on his delegations.

Sir William Johnson established an Anglican mission in Canajoharie in 1769, when he paid for the Indian Castle Church to be built nearby. This was several years before the American Revolutionary War. Today it has been designated as part of the Mohawk Upper Castle Historic District, a National Historic Landmark. A mission was established earlier in the century at Fort Schuyler on Schoharie Creek.

== See also ==
- Joseph Brant
- Sir William Johnson
