= The War that Made America =

American television documentary series

The War that Made America is a PBS miniseries (produced by WQED Pittsburgh) about the French and Indian War, which was first aired in two parts on January 18 and 25, 2006. The series features extensive reenactments of historical events, with on-screen narration provided by Canadian actor Graham Greene. Much of the story focuses upon George Washington, connecting his role in the war with the later American Revolution. Pontiac's War, which followed the French and Indian War, is also covered in the series. The series was filmed in June, July, and August 2004 in and around the Western Pennsylvania region where many events actually took place during the war.

The book that accompanies the series is The War that Made America: A Short History of the French and Indian War (2005), by historian Fred Anderson.

Besides Washington, historical people portrayed prominently in the film include:

- Tanacharison ("Half King")
- Sir William Johnson
- Edward Braddock
- James Smith
- Louis-Joseph de Montcalm
- Theyanoguin ("King Hendrick")
- Mary Jemison
- Guyasuta
- Jeffery Amherst
- Pontiac

== Episodes ==
- "A Country Between"
- "Unlikely Allies"
- "Turning the Tide"
- "Unintended Consequences"
