= Canajoharie =

Mohawk nation town in New York, United States

Canajoharie Kana’tsioharé:ke (Mohawk)
- Indigenous town
- Location in New York
- Coordinates: 42°54′17″N 74°38′28″W
- Country: United States
- State: New York

Canajoharie (/ˌkænədʒəˈhɛəri/, Mohawk: Kana’tsioharé:ke), also known as the "Upper Castle", was the name of one of two major towns of the Mohawk nation in 1738. The community stretched for a mile and a half along the southern bank of the Mohawk River in today’s central New York State, from a village known as Dekanohage westward to what is now Fort Plain.

The Mohawk Upper Castle Historic District has been designated as a National Historic Landmark and listed on the National Register of Historic Places. It contains the Indian Castle Church, built in 1769 for the Mohawk by Sir William Johnson, the British Superintendent of Indian Affairs, on land donated by his consort Molly Brant and her brother Joseph Brant, both leaders among the Mohawk. The site also has archeological resources related to Iroquois history. For a time the town was the home of the notable Mohawk leaders Hendrick Theyanoguin (1692–1755) and the Brants. According to Joseph Brant, Canajoharie means "a kettle stuck on a pole." A modern etymology translates it as "a washed kettle" or "the pot that washes itself". It refers to swirling actions of water in a large circular pothole in the Canajoharie Creek near where it empties into the Mohawk River.

The modern village of Canajoharie, New York, was settled by European Americans in 1788, following half a century of increasing presence, a few miles to the east of the historic Mohawk village.

== See also ==
- Fort Hunter
