= Sir William Johnson, 1st Baronet =

British Army officer and colonial administrator

Sir William Johnson Bt
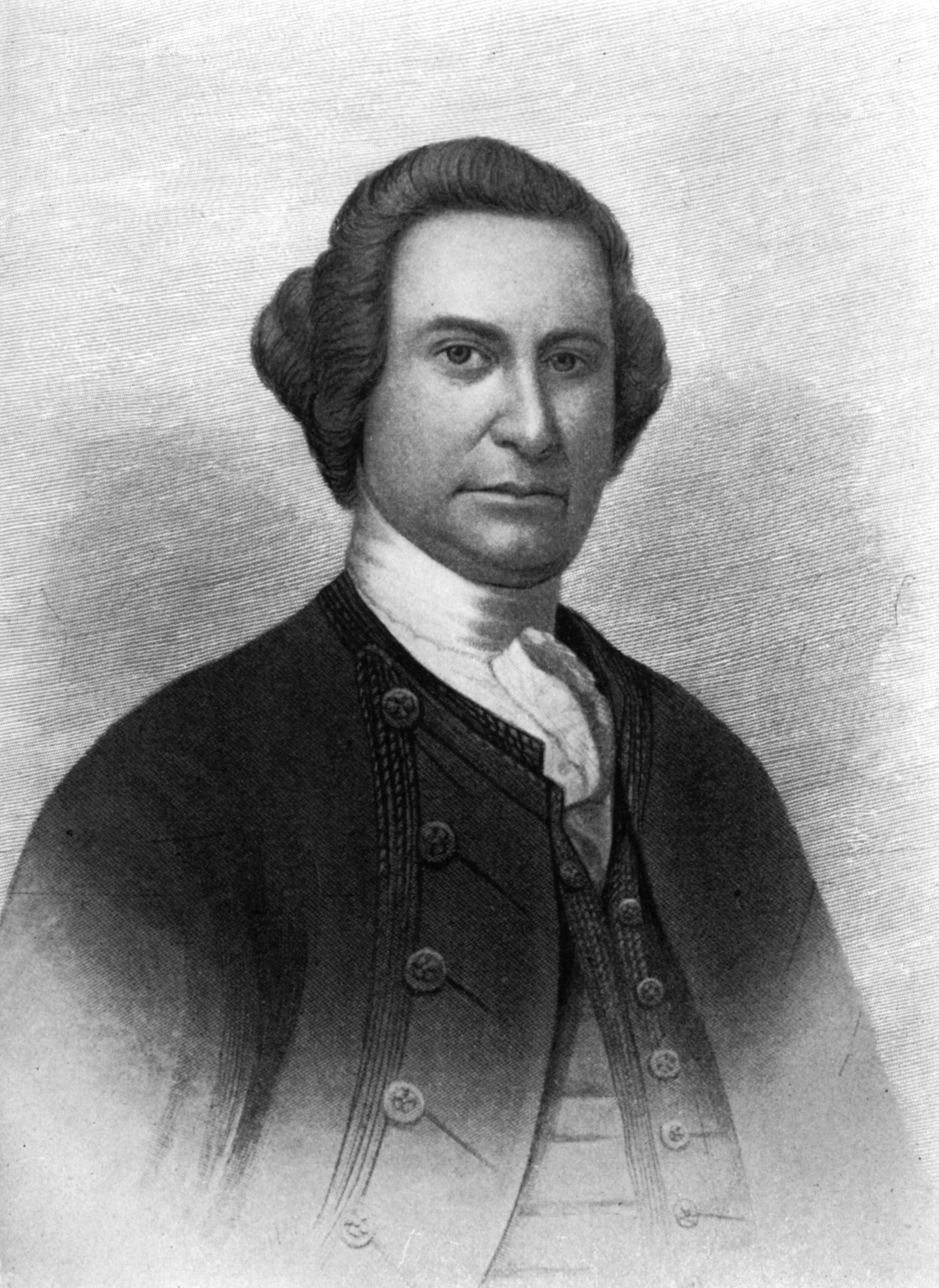
- Engraving of a lost portrait of Johnson made by Thomas McIlworth in 1763

Personal details
- Born: c. 1715 County Meath, Ireland
- Died: 11 July 1774 (aged 58–59) Johnstown, New York
- Relations: Peter Warren (uncle)
- Children: Ann Claus, John, 2nd Bt.

Military service
- Allegiance: Great Britain
- Branch/service: British Army
- Years of service: 1744–1774
- Rank: Major general
- Battles/wars: King George's War; French and Indian War; Battle of Lake George; Battle of Carillon; Battle of Fort Niagara; Pontiac's War

Major-General Sir William Johnson, 1st Baronet (c. 1715 – 11 July 1774), was a British Army officer and colonial administrator. As a young man, Johnson moved to the Province of New York to manage an estate purchased by his uncle, the Royal Navy officer Sir Peter Warren, which was located in territory of the Mohawk people, one of the six peoples of the Haudenosaunee Confederacy. Johnson learned the Mohawk language and customs, and was appointed the British agent to the Haudenosaunee.

Johnson commanded Haudenosaunee and colonial militia forces against the French and their allies during the French and Indian War. Commissioned as a major general in the British army, his role in the victory at the Battle of Lake George in 1755 earned him a baronetcy of New York. His capture of Fort Niagara from the French in 1759 brought him additional renown. Throughout his career as a British official among the Haudenosaunee, Johnson combined personal business with official diplomacy, acquiring tens of thousands of acres of Native land and becoming very wealthy.

== Early life and career ==
Coat of Arms of William Johnson

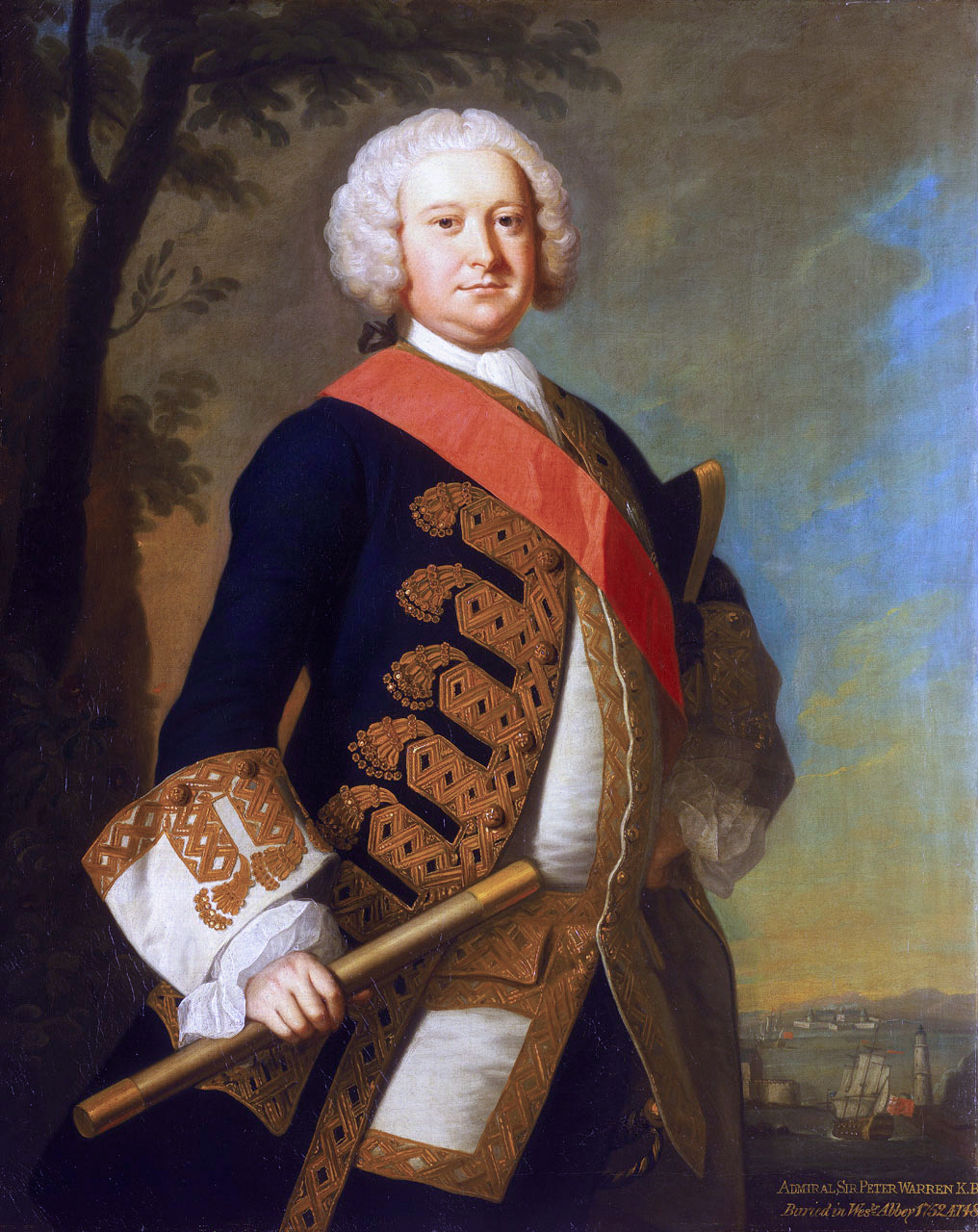
Admiral Sir Peter Warren, c. 1751

William Johnson was born around 1715 in County Meath, in the Kingdom of Ireland. He was the eldest son of Christopher Johnson (1687–1764) of Smithstown, County Meath, and Anne Warren, daughter of Michael Warren of Warrenstown, County Meath and Catherine Aylmer, sister of Admiral Matthew Aylmer, 1st Baron Aylmer.

His mother Anne was from an "Old English" Catholic gentry family who had, in previous generations, lost much of their status to the "New English". His father was descended from the O'Neill dynasty of County Armagh. William Johnson's paternal grandfather was originally known as William MacShane, but changed his surname to Johnson, the Anglicisation of the Gaelic Mac Seáin or Seagháin.

Some early biographers portrayed William Johnson as living in poverty in Ireland, but modern studies reveal that his family lived a comfortable, if modest, lifestyle. Although the Johnson family had a history of Jacobitism, William Johnson's maternal uncle Peter Warren was raised as a Protestant to enable him to pursue a career in the British Royal Navy. He achieved considerable success, gaining wealth along the way.

== Immigration to the colonies ==
Peter Warren had purchased a large tract of undeveloped land along the south side of the Mohawk River in the province of New York then known as Warrensberg (or Warrensbush) (now present day Florida, NY). Warren convinced Johnson to lead an effort to establish a settlement there, to be known as Warrensburgh, with the implied understanding that Johnson would inherit much of the land. Johnson arrived in about 1738 with twelve Irish Protestant families and began to clear the land. He purchased enslaved Africans to do the heavy labor of clearance; they were the first of many slaves bought by Johnson.

Warren intended Johnson to become involved in trading with American Indians, largely the Mohawk and other of the Six Nations of the Haudenosaunee, tribes who dominated the area west of Albany. Johnson soon discovered that the trade routes were to the north, on the opposite side of the river from Warrensburgh. Acting on his own initiative, in 1739 Johnson bought a house and small farm on the north side of the river, where he built a store and a sawmill. From this location, which he called "Mount Johnson", Johnson was able to cut into Albany's Indian trade. He supplied goods to traders who were headed to Fort Oswego, and bought furs from them when they returned downriver. He dealt directly with New York City merchants, thus avoiding the middlemen at Albany. The Albany merchants were irate, and Warren was not pleased that his nephew was becoming independent.

Johnson became closely associated with the Mohawk, the easternmost nation of the Six Nations of the Haudenosaunee or Iroquois League. By the time Johnson arrived, their population had collapsed to 580 persons, due to chronic infectious diseases unwittingly introduced by Europeans and warfare with competing tribes related to the lucrative beaver trade. The Mohawk thought an alliance with Johnson could advance their interests in the British imperial system. Around 1742, they adopted him as an honorary sachem, or civil chief, and gave him the name Warraghiyagey, which he translated as "A Man who undertakes great Things".

== King George's War, 1744-1748 ==
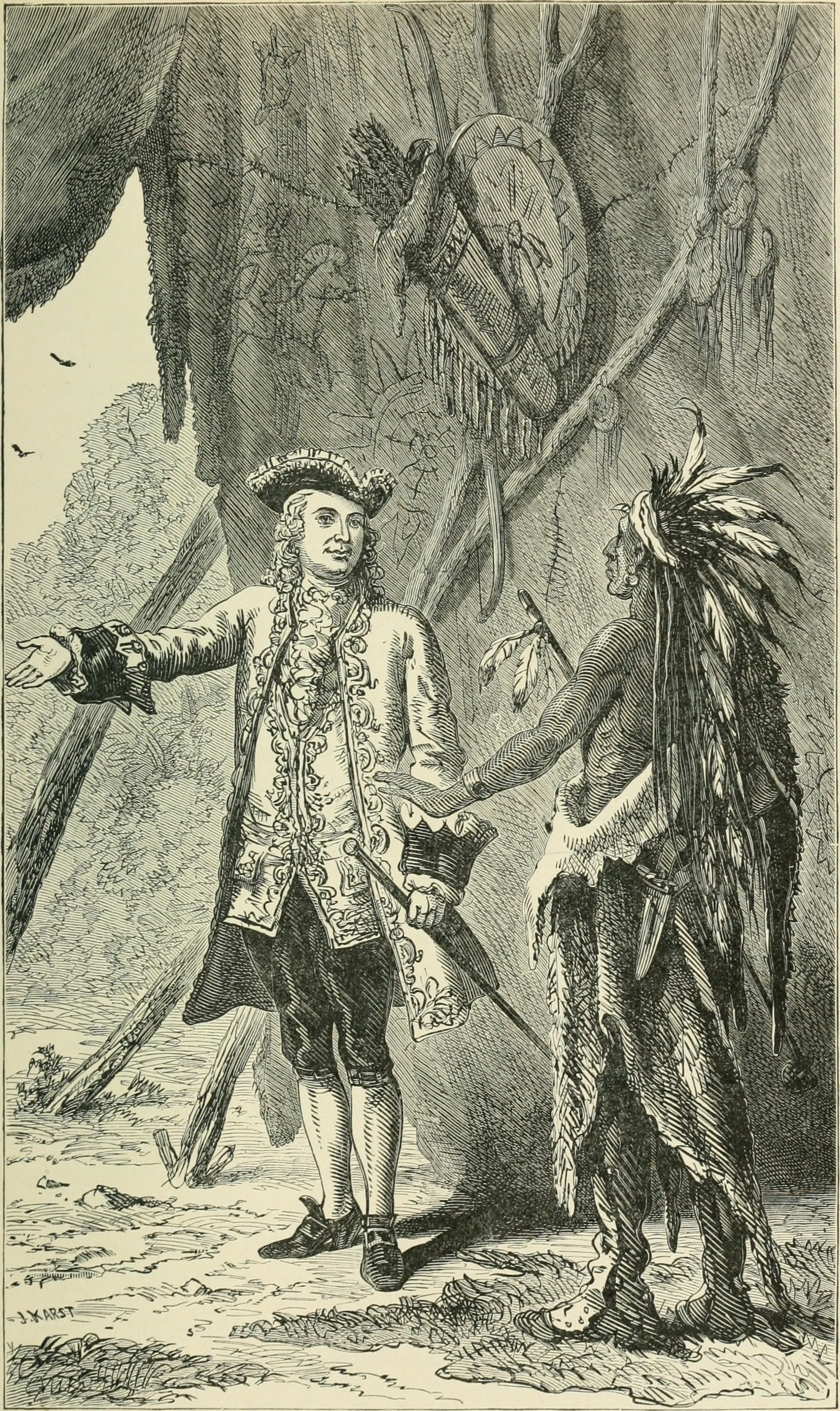
William Johnson negotiating with a Mohawk chief. History of the City of New York, 1896.

In 1744, the War of the Austrian Succession spread to colonial America, where it was known as King George's War. Because of his close relationship with the Mohawk, in 1746 Johnson was appointed by the British colonial government as New York's sole agent to the Haudenosaunee, replacing the ineffective Albany-based Indian commissioners.

The newly created "Colonel of the Warriors of the Six Nations" was instructed to enlist and equip colonists and Indians for a campaign against the French. Recruiting Haudenosaunee warriors was difficult: ever since the so-called Grand Settlement of 1701, the Haudenosaunee nations had maintained a policy of neutrality in colonial wars between France and Great Britain. Working with the Mohawk chief Hendrick Theyanoguin, Johnson recruited Mohawk warriors to fight on the side of the British. Johnson organized small raiding parties, which were sent against the settlements of the French and their Indian allies. In accordance with New York's Scalp Act of 1747, Johnson paid bounties for scalps, although he realized this encouraged the scalping of non-combatants of all ages and both sexes. In June 1748, Johnson was appointed as "Colonel of the New York levies", a position that gave him additional responsibility for the colonial militias at Albany. In July 1748, word was received of a peace settlement. The Mohawk had suffered heavy casualties in the war, which lessened Johnson's prestige among them for a while.

In 1748, Johnson built a new stone house upriver from Mount Johnson, which became known as Fort Johnson. The home was strongly fortified when the next war approached.

== Relations with New York ==
After King George's War, Johnson was caught between rival New York political factions. One faction was led by Governor George Clinton, who had appointed Johnson as New York's Indian agent and, in 1750, appointed him to the Governor's Council. Governor Clinton urged the New York Assembly to repay Johnson's outstanding wartime expenses, which amounted to £2,000. Repayment was blocked by Clinton's political rivals led by Lieutenant Governor James De Lancey, who was connected to the Albany Indian commissioners whom Johnson had supplanted. De Lancey was also the brother-in-law of Admiral Warren, which added to the strain in the relationship between Johnson and Warren.

An exasperated Johnson resigned as New York's Indian commissioner in 1751, focusing instead on his business interests. When Warren died in July 1752, he left nothing to Johnson in his will; instead, he stipulated that his nephew was now responsible for all outstanding expenses from the establishment of Warrensberg.

In 1755, Johnson shifted the primary meeting place for diplomatic councils between the British and the Haudenosaunee from Albany to Fort Johnson. He also bought houses in Schenectady and Albany to stop at on his business trips to New York.

== French and Indian War ==
In June 1753, Hendrick Theyanoguin and a delegation of Mohawk traveled to New York City, where they announced to Governor Clinton that the Covenant Chain—the diplomatic relationship between the British and the Haudenosaunee—was broken. The British government ordered Clinton to convene the Albany Congress of 1754 to repair the Covenant Chain. At the Congress, the Mohawk insisted that the alliance would be restored only if Johnson were reinstated as their agent.

Johnson's reinstatement as Indian agent came the following year, just as the French and Indian War, the North American theater of the Seven Years' War, was escalating. In 1755, Major General Edward Braddock, sent to North America to direct the British war effort, turned to Johnson for assistance in obtaining Native scouts. Although Johnson had little military experience, he was commissioned as a major general and instructed to lead an expedition against the French fort at Crown Point. His troops were provincial soldiers paid for by the colonies, rather than regular soldiers of the British Army, which meant that he had to deal with six different colonial governments while organizing the expedition.

Johnson initially had nearly 5,000 colonials at his command, but General William Shirley, Governor of Massachusetts and ordered to lead a simultaneous expedition to Fort Niagara, shifted some of Johnson's men and resources to his own campaign against the French post. Tensions escalated as the two generals worked against each other in recruiting Native allies. The dispute was complicated by the unusual command structure: as Braddock's second-in-command, General Shirley was Johnson's superior officer, but when it came to Indian affairs, Johnson was theoretically in charge. In time, Shirley would blame the failure of his expedition on Johnson's refusal to provide him with adequate Indian support. According to the Johnson biographer Milton Hamilton, historians usually portrayed Johnson as acting unreasonably in the controversy with Shirley, but Hamilton argued that Johnson was simply reacting to Shirley's clumsy Indian diplomacy, which harmed the British relationship with the Six Nations.

=== Crown Point expedition ===
Marching north into French territory, in August 1755 Johnson renamed Lac du Saint-Sacrement to Lake George in honour of his king. On 8 September 1755, Johnson's forces held their ground in the Battle of Lake George. Johnson was wounded by a ball that was to remain in his hip or thigh for the rest of his life. Hendrick Theyanoguin, Johnson's Mohawk ally, was killed in the battle, and Baron Dieskau, the French commander, was captured. Johnson prevented the Mohawk from killing the wounded Dieskau, an act memorialized in later paintings of the event.

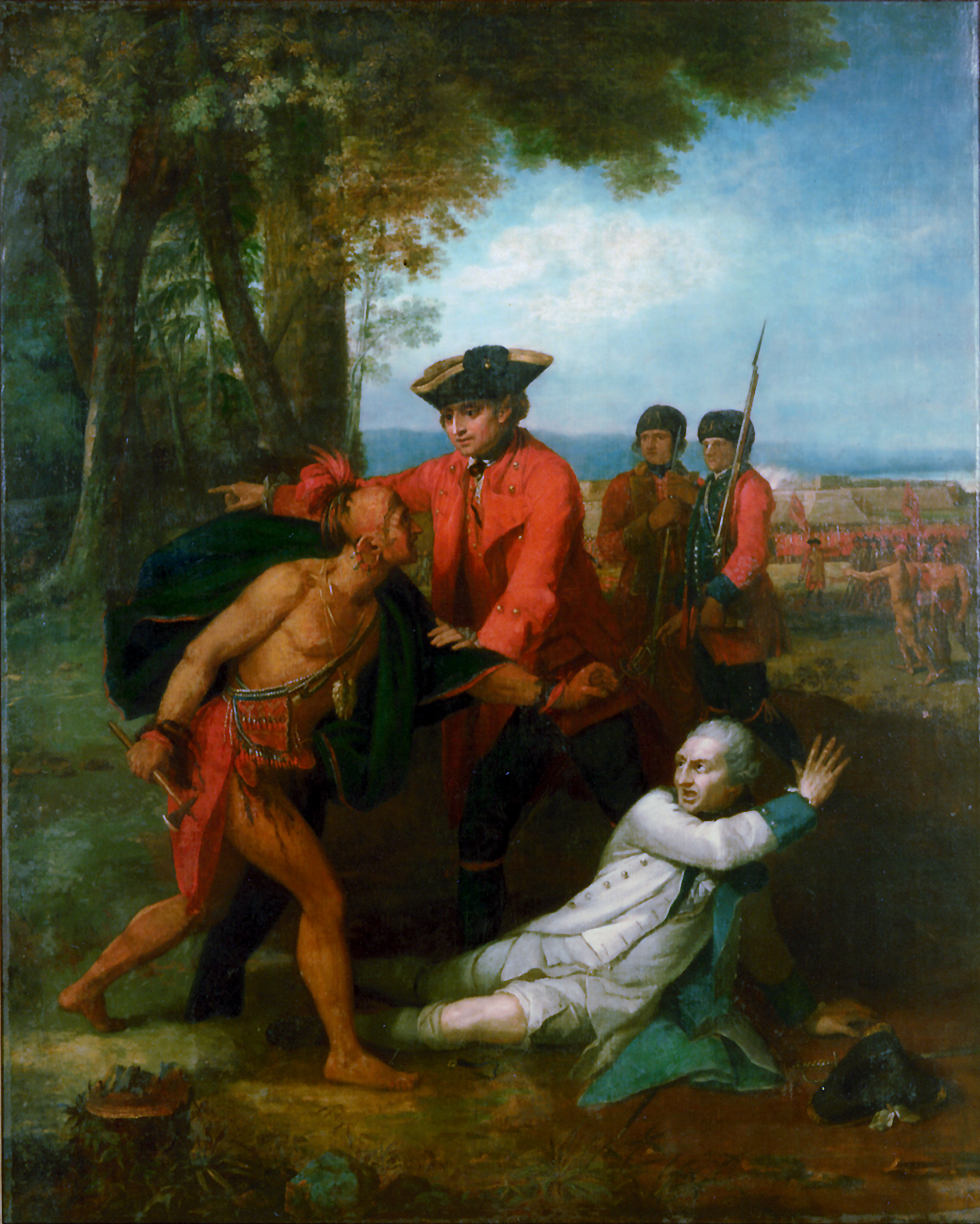
General Johnson Saving a Wounded French Officer from the Tomahawk of a North American Indian by Benjamin West

Escutcheon of the Johnson baronets of New York

The battle ended the expedition against Crown Point. Johnson built Fort William Henry at Lake George to strengthen British defences. In December, tired of army life, Johnson resigned his generalship. General Shirley, who had become the commander-in-chief upon Braddock's death, sought to have Johnson's commission as Indian agent modified, forcing Johnson to work for him directly. This attempt at retaliation was foiled when Shirley was unexpectedly removed from office and recalled to England.

Although the Battle of Lake George was hardly a decisive victory, the British needed a military hero in a year of major setbacks, and Johnson became that man. Claims that Johnson had been disabled by his wound early in the battle, and thus did not participate in the victory, did not reduce the recognition given to him. As a reward for his services, Parliament voted Johnson £5,000 and King George made him a baronet. "Never was such an insignificant encounter so generously rewarded", wrote the historian Julian Gwyn.

In January 1756, the British government made Johnson sole Superintendent of Indian Affairs for the northern colonies. This position gave him great influence and power, since he would report directly to the government in London and would not be controlled by provincial governments. Of all the Indian nations in the northern colonies, Johnson was most knowledgeable about, and most closely connected to, the Haudenosaunee Six Nations, especially the Mohawk. As superintendent, he would make the Haudenosaunee the focus of British diplomacy, promoting and even exaggerating the power of the Haudenosaunee Confederacy. Johnson also began a long process of seeking to dominate the Confederacy's diplomatic and political administration, attempting "nothing less than the refurbishment of the Haudenosaunee confederacy with himself as to its centre".

=== Capture of Fort Niagara ===
Although Johnson was no longer a British general, he continued to lead Haudenosaunee and frontier militia. In August 1757, after the French began their siege of Fort William Henry, Johnson arrived at Fort Edward with 180 Indians and 1,500 militia. Greatly overestimating the size of the French army, British General Daniel Webb decided against sending a relief force from Fort Edward to Fort William Henry. The British were compelled to surrender Fort William Henry, after which many were killed in an infamous massacre. Stories circulated that Johnson was enraged by Webb's decision not to send help, and that he stripped naked in front of Webb to express his disgust.

With the war going badly for the British, Johnson found it difficult to enlist the support of the Six Nations, who were not eager to join a losing cause. In July 1758, he managed to raise 450 warriors to take part in a massive expedition led by the new British commander, General James Abercrombie. The campaign ended ingloriously with Abercrombie's disastrous attempt to take Fort Carillon from the French. Johnson and his Indian auxiliaries could do little as British forces stormed the French positions in fruitless frontal assaults.

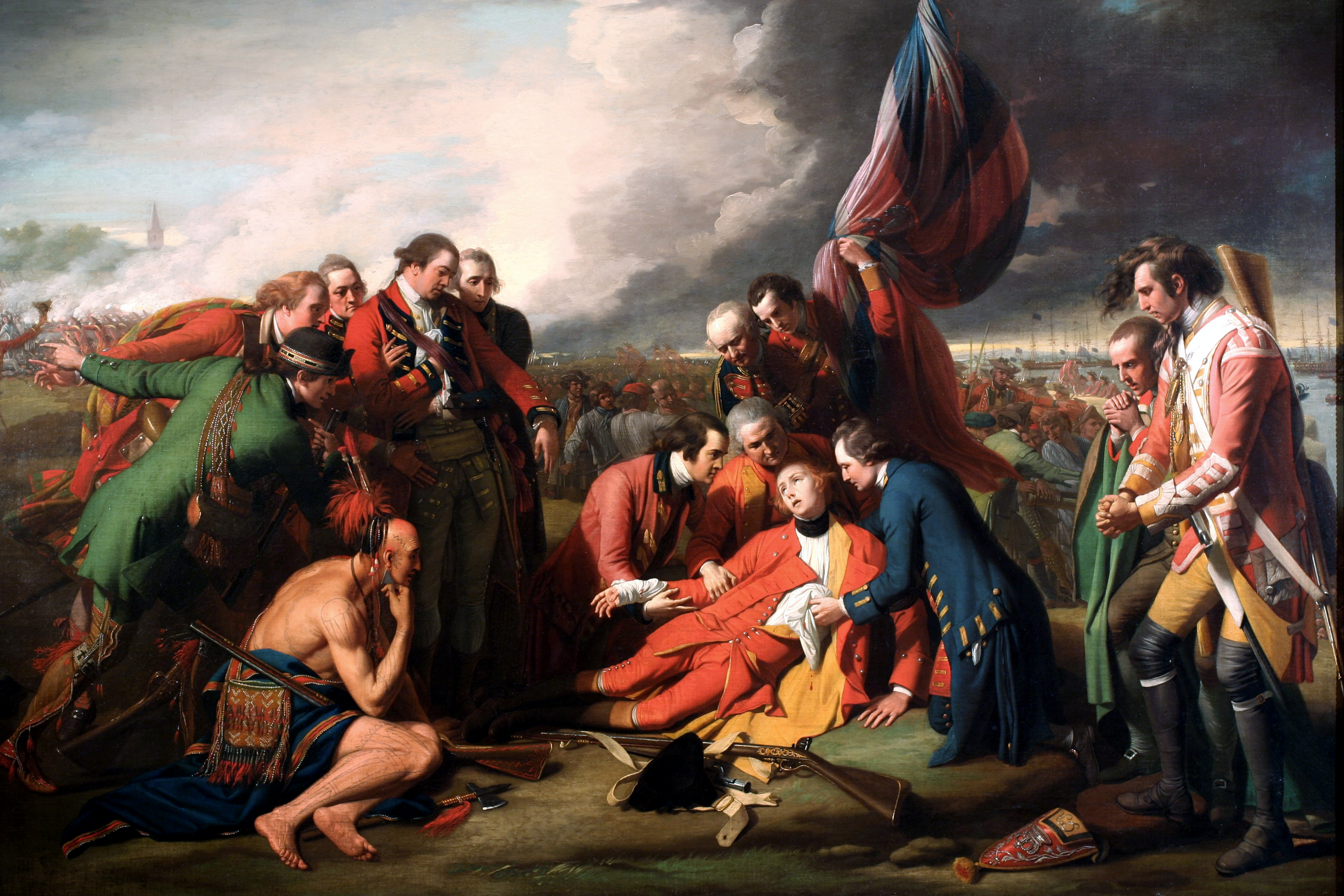
Johnson, in green, is depicted in Benjamin West's iconic painting The Death of General Wolfe, although he was not present at the event.

In 1758, with the capture of Louisbourg, Fort Frontenac, and Fort Duquesne, the war's momentum began to shift in favour of the British. Johnson was able to recruit more Haudenosaunee warriors. In the summer of 1759, he led nearly 1,000 Haudenosaunee warriors—practically the entire military strength of the Six Nations—as part of General John Prideaux's expedition to capture Fort Niagara. When Prideaux was killed, Johnson took command.

He captured the fort after ambushing and defeating a French relief force at the Battle of La Belle-Famille. Johnson is usually credited with leading or at least planning this ambush, but the historian Francis Jennings argued that Johnson was not present at the battle, and that he exaggerated his role in official dispatches. The conquest of Niagara drove the French line back from the Great Lakes. Once more, Johnson was celebrated as a hero, although some professional soldiers expressed doubts about his military abilities and the value of the Haudenosaunee in the victory. Johnson commanded the "largest Native American force ever assembled under the British flag."

Johnson accompanied General Jeffery Amherst in the final North American campaign of the Seven Years' War, the capture of Montreal in 1760. With the fall of New France to the British, Johnson and his deputy George Croghan spent much time negotiating with the former Indian allies of the French. In 1761, Johnson made a 1,000-mile (1,600 km) round trip to Detroit to hold a conference with the regional American Indians. Johnson confronted the assembled chiefs about the anti-British rumours that were circulating among the Natives, and managed, for the time being, to forestall outright resistance to the British military occupation of the West. Normand Macleod met Johnson at this conference and returned with him to New York. Macleod was later appointed as commander of Fort Oswego, on Lake Ontario.

== British Superintendent of Indian Affairs ==
Because of his knowledge of Haudenosaunee languages and customs and his success in business and governance, he was appointed the newly established British Superintendent of Indian Affairs for the northern district, serving from 1756 until his death in 1774. In this role, Johnson worked to keep American Indians attached to the British interest. Johnson's counterpart for the southern colonies was John Stuart.

== Postwar development ==
After the French and Indian War, Johnson hoped to concentrate on expanding and improving his land holdings. In December 1760, the Mohawk of Canajoharie gave Johnson a tract of about 80,000 acres (320 km^{2}) north of the Mohawk River. This grant proved to be controversial because other land speculators had already obtained licenses to purchase lands that the Mohawk released for sale, but Sir William had not. In 1769, after years of manoeuvring and lobbying, Johnson finally gained royal approval for the grant. This was one of several large tracts of land that Johnson acquired from the Mohawk and Haudenosaunee using his position as a royal Indian agent. By the time of his death, Johnson had accumulated about 170,000 acres (690 km^{2}) and was one of the largest land owners in British America, surpassed only by the Penn and van Rensselaer families. According to historian Julian Gwyn:

In all this he acted no differently from dozens of other speculators in Indian lands. He was distinguished only by the great advantages he possessed through his office and his long intimacy with the Indians. He was indeed one of their principal exploiters....

In 1762, Johnson founded the city of Johnstown on his grant, about 25 miles (40 km) west of Schenectady, New York, north of the Mohawk River. He named the new settlement, originally called John's Town, after his son John. There, at the Crown expense, he established a free school for both white and Mohawk children.

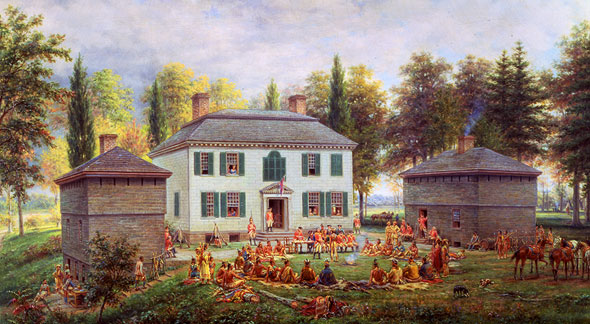
Johnson hosting a Haudenosaunee conference at Johnson Hall in 1772 (painting by E. L. Henry, 1903)

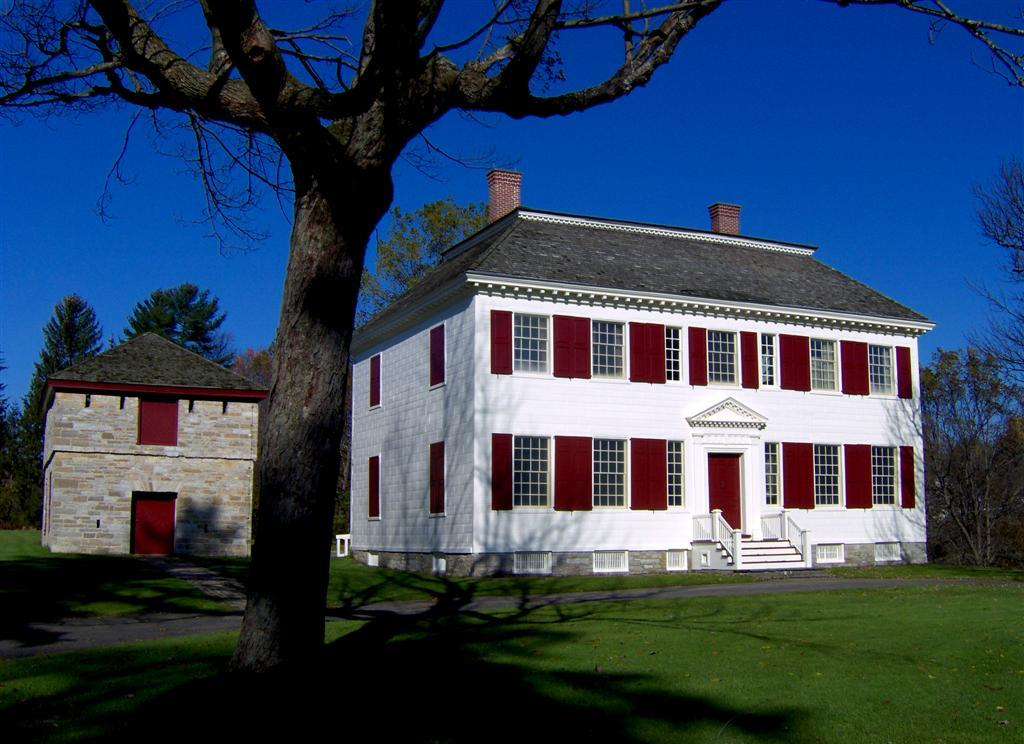
Johnson Hall 2006

Outside the town, in 1763 he built Johnson Hall, where he lived until his death. He recruited numerous Irish immigrant tenant farmers for his extensive lands, and lived essentially as a feudal landlord. He also purchased enslaved Africans to work as labourers, especially in his lumber operations. Johnson had some 60 slaves working for him, making him the largest slaveholder in the county and likely in the province, comparable to major planters in the American South. In 1766, Johnson organised St. Patrick's Lodge, No. 4, a Freemason lodge, at Johnson Hall, and was installed as its master. His nephew Guy Johnson succeeded him as master of this lodge in 1770.

Johnson was a strong supporter of the Anglican Church in the colony. To counter the influence of French Catholic missionaries in western New York, in 1769 he paid for the construction of an Anglican church for the Mohawk of Canajoharie, a village the British called the "Upper Castle". The building, later used by European-American congregations and known as Indian Castle Church, still stands near Danube, New York. It is part of the Mohawk Upper Castle Historic District, a National Historic Landmark. In 1771, Johnson built St. John's Episcopal Church in Johnstown, but soon complained that it was "small and very ill built." Within five years, he arranged for a larger church of stone to be constructed to accommodate the growing congregation in Johnstown. The historic church is still operating.

== Pontiac's War and final years ==
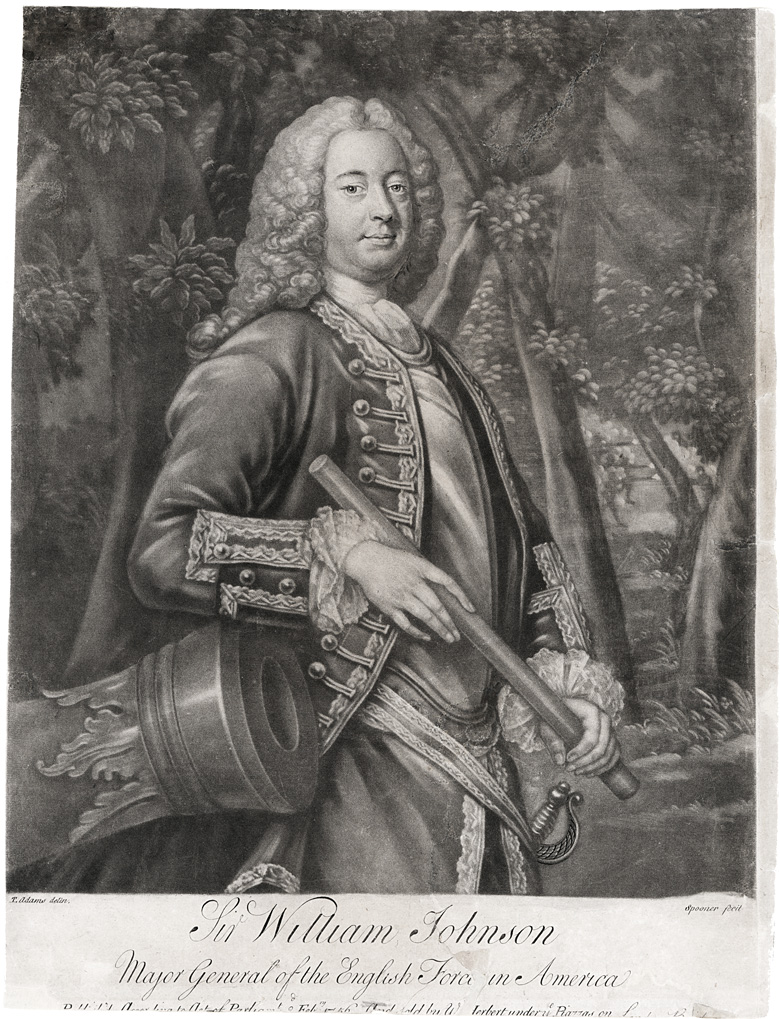
This mezzotint of William Johnson was published in London in 1756.

In 1763, Pontiac's War resulted from Native American discontent with British policy following the French and Indian War. For several years prior to the uprising, Johnson had advised General Jeffery Amherst to observe Haudenosaunee diplomatic practices, for instance, awarding gifts to Native leaders, a practice they considered an important cultural symbol of respect and significant to maintaining good relations. Amherst, who rejected Johnson's advice, was recalled to London and replaced by General Thomas Gage. Amherst's recall strengthened Johnson's position, because a policy of compromise was required with the Indians, and this was Johnson's domain. Johnson negotiated a treaty with Pontiac in 1766, which finally ended the war.

From July to August 1764, Johnson negotiated a treaty at Fort Niagara with about 2,000 American Indians in attendance, primarily Haudenosaunee. Although most Haudenosaunee had stayed out of the war, the Seneca from the Genesee River valley had taken up arms against the British, and Johnson worked to bring them back into the Covenant Chain alliance. Johnson convinced the Haudenosaunee to send a war party against the Seneca involved in the uprising, but otherwise the Haudenosaunee did not contribute to the war effort as much as Johnson had desired.

Johnson was a proponent of the Royal Proclamation of 1763, which called for tighter imperial control and restraint of westward colonial expansion. Johnson negotiated the details of the boundary defined in the Fort Stanwix Treaty of 1768. Against instructions from London, Johnson pushed the boundary 400 miles (640 km) to the west, enabling him and other land speculators to acquire much more land than originally authorised by the British government. Johnson was strongly criticised for exceeding his instructions, but many of the land speculators were well-connected in the government, and the expanded boundary was allowed to stand. During this time he became a member of the American Philosophical Society through his election to membership in 1768.

Native American discontent continued to grow in the west in the 1770s. Johnson spent his final years attempting to prevent another uprising like Pontiac's War. Pursuing a policy of divide and rule, he worked to block the emergence of intertribal Native American alliances. His final success was his isolation of the Shawnee before Dunmore's War in 1774.

== Marriage and family ==
In his lifetime, Johnson gained a reputation as a man who had numerous children with several European and Native American women. At the time, men were not ostracised for having illegitimate children, as long as they could afford it and supported them. One 20th-century scholar estimated that Johnson had perhaps 100 illegitimate children, but historian Francis Jennings argued that "there is no truth in wild stories that he slept with innumerable Mohawk women." In his will, Johnson acknowledged children by German woman Catherine Weisenberg and Mohawk woman Molly Brant, with whom he had long-term consensual relationships. He implicitly acknowledged several other children by unnamed mothers.

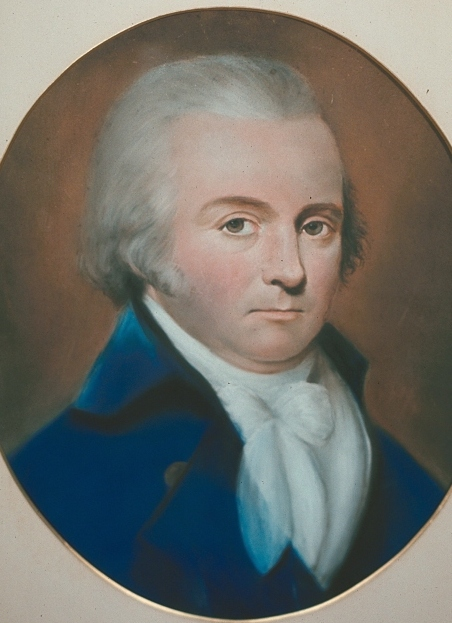
Sir John Johnson, 2nd Baronet

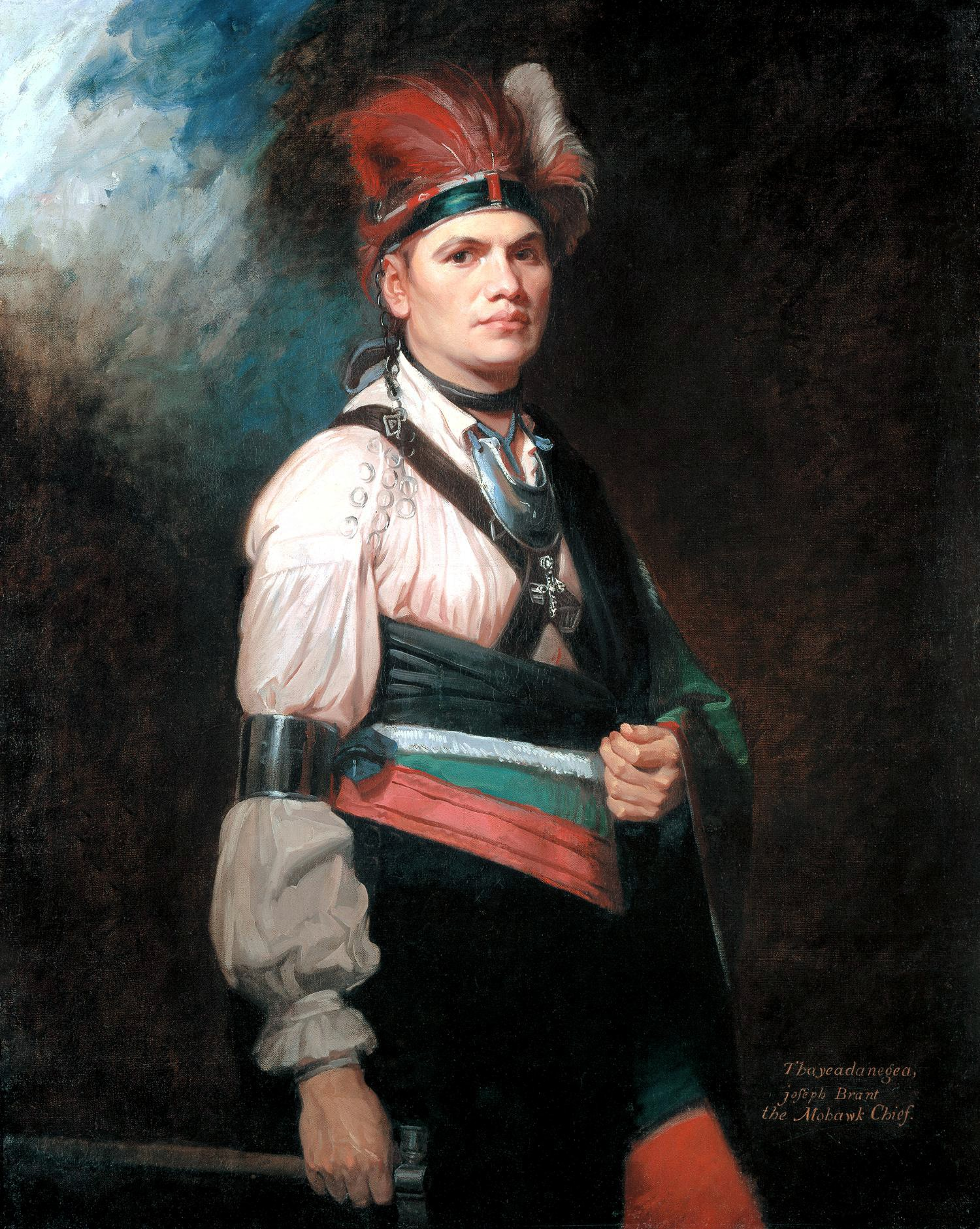
Joseph Brant

In 1739, shortly after arriving in America, Johnson began a relationship with Catherine Weisenberg (c. 1723–1759), a German immigrant from the Electorate of the Palatinate. She originally came to the colonies as an indentured servant, but had run away, perhaps with the help of friends or relatives. According to tradition, she was working for another family near Warrensburgh when Johnson purchased the remainder of her indenture contract, perhaps initially to have her serve as his housekeeper. While there is no record that the couple ever formally married, New York did not require civil marriage licenses or certificates to be filed at that time, and Weisenberg was Johnson's common-law wife. The couple had three known children together, including daughters Nancy and Mary (Polly), and a son John, first christened only under the surname Weisenberg at Fort Hunter. The senior Johnson later arranged for his son John to inherit his title and estates as John Johnson. A grandson of Sir William Johnson was the 3rd Baronet Sir Adam Gordon Johnson who was, through his grandmother Ann Watts, a descendant of the Schuyler, Delancey, and Van Cortlandt families of British North America.

At the same time, Johnson had a relationship with Elizabeth Brant, a Mohawk woman by whom he had three known children: Keghneghtago or Brant (born in 1742), Thomas (1744), and Christian (1745); the younger two boys died in infancy. About 1750, Johnson had a son named Tagawirunta, also known as William of Canajoharie, by a Mohawk woman, possibly Margaret Brant, Elizabeth's younger sister. Johnson may have also been intimate with the sisters Susannah and Elizabeth Wormwood, and an Irish woman named Mary McGrath, by whom he appeared to have had a daughter named Mary. Mary, Keghneghtago (Brant), and Tagawirunta (William) received inheritances in Johnson's will.

In 1759, Johnson began a common-law relationship with Molly Brant, a Mohawk woman who lived with Johnson as his consort at Johnson Hall for the rest of his life. Molly was the older sister of Joseph Brant, who joined the household when he was young. Johnson's relationship with Molly gave him additional influence with the Mohawk. The couple had eight children together, all of whom received land from Johnson by his will. A grandson of William Johnson and Molly Brant was William Johnson Kerr, who married Elizabeth Brant, a daughter of Joseph Brant and granddaughter of George Croghan and their Mohawk wives.

== Death and legacy ==
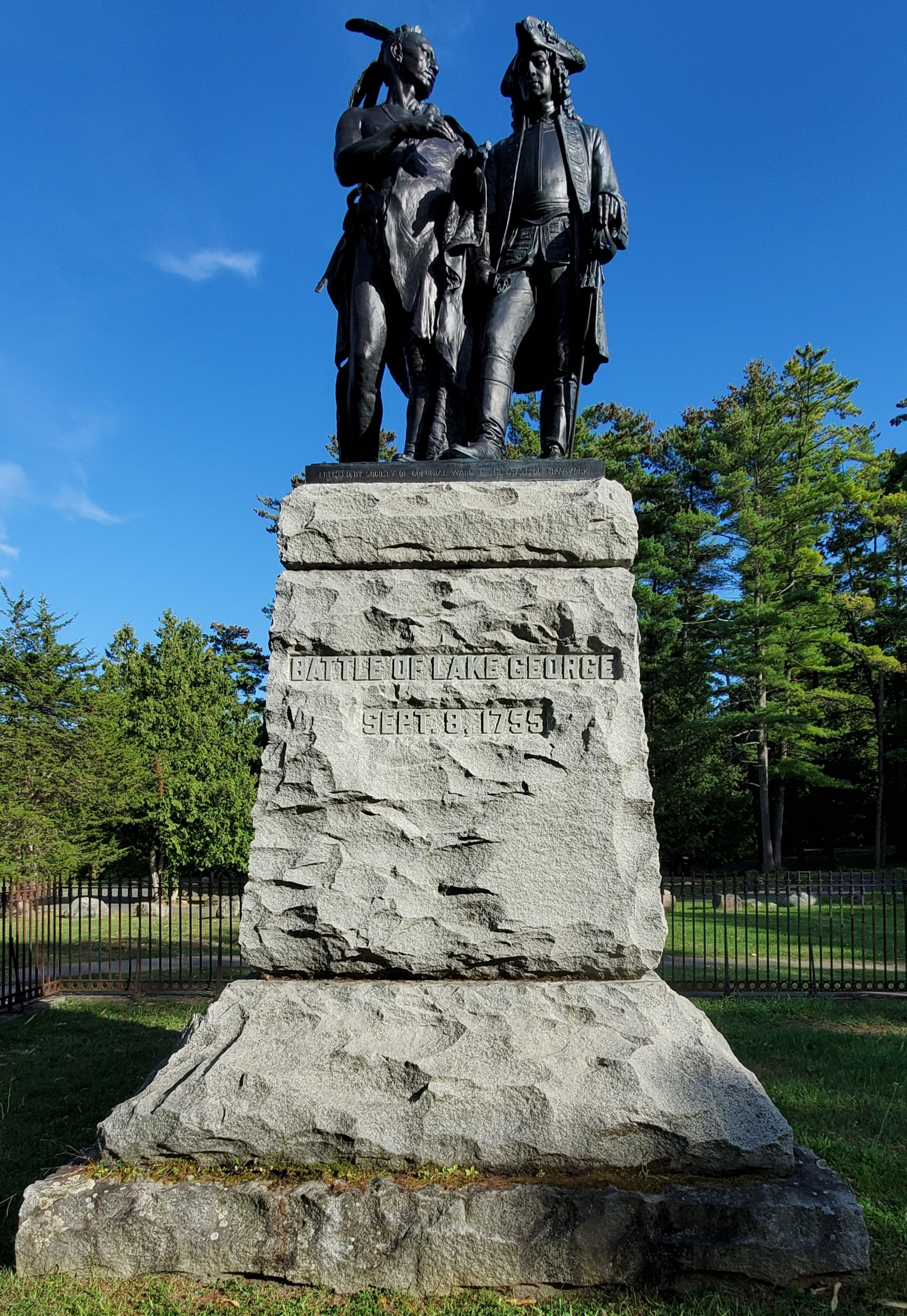
The Battle of Lake George (1903) by Albert Weinert shows Johnson (right) alongside Hendrick Theyanoguin.

Johnson died from a stroke at Johnson Hall on 11 July 1774 during an Indian conference. Guy Johnson, William's nephew and son-in-law (he had married Mary/Polly), reported that Johnson died when he was "seized of a suffocation." His funeral in Johnstown was attended by more than 2,000 people. His pallbearers included Governor William Franklin of New Jersey and the justices of the New York Supreme Court. He was buried beneath the altar in St. John's Episcopal church, the church he founded in Johnstown. The next day chiefs of the Six Nations performed the condolence ceremony and recognized Guy Johnson as Sir William's successor.

During the American Revolution, the rebel New York legislature seized all of Johnson's lands and property, as his heirs were Loyalists.

=== Native American relations ===
Johnson's most important legacy is the comparatively peaceful co-existence of Anglo-Americans and Native groups during his tenure as Indian Agent for British North America. As an adopted Mohawk chief and husband of Mohawk Mary (Molly) Brant, according to Haudenosaunee law, he was a trusted counselor and member of the Mohawk nation. Through that affiliation, he was considered a member of the Six Nations of the Haudenosaunee. That position gave him standing not only to lead Haudenosaunee into battle on the side of the English, but also to negotiate two treaties of Fort Stanwix (which developed as modern-day Rome, New York). While the treaties deprived many Native Americans of their land without their knowledge, they gave favorable terms to the Haudenosaunee, and resulted in decades of comparative peace between traditional Indian residents and new settlers.

Co-existence was part of Johnson's other major historical legacy: the protection of British sovereignty and Anglo-American settlement as a bulwark against French control of northern New York and the Great Lakes region more generally. Johnson was instrumental in sustaining the British-Haudenosaunee alliance through the Covenant Chain, which consolidated both Haudenosaunee and British territorial and commercial interests against the rival Algonquin and French interests in New France before 1763. After Britain assumed control of former French territories east of the Mississippi River, Johnson eventually won a political dispute over Native American policy with Lord Jeffery Amherst. He had disdained the Haudenosaunee alliance that Johnson had so devoted himself to nurturing and defending. It was to Johnson that Pontiac finally surrendered after the eventual failure of the conflict named for him.

=== Structures ===
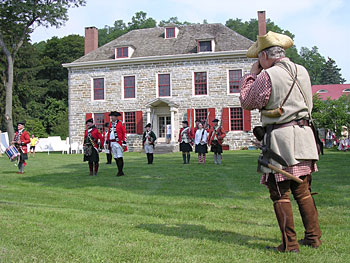
Old Fort Johnson

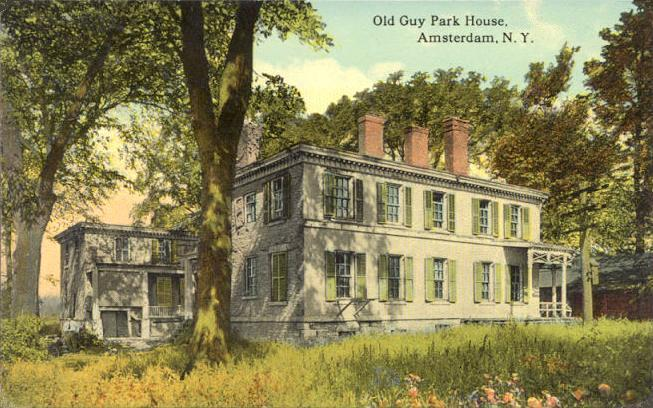
Guy Park manor

Old Fort Johnson, his first home built in 1749, is on the Historic American Buildings Survey. It is now used by the Montgomery County Historical Society, which operates a museum and gift shop there, as well as allowing it to be an event venue. Guy Park Manor, built in 1773, for Sir William's daughter Mary (Polly) and her husband, his nephew Guy Johnson, is also open to the public.

In 1960 Johnson Hall was named a National Historic Landmark. It is a designated State Historic Site and open to the public.

=== Papers ===
A 1911 fire at the New York State Library damaged or destroyed a collection of about 6550 pieces of Johnson's papers. A 1921 publication of the papers collected from salvaged documents, other archives, and from an early printer's proof of his works exists for historians interested in studying Sir William.

== In popular culture ==
The Johnstown High School mascot is the "Sir Bill" in Johnson's honor (or "Lady Bill" for all-female teams). The teams' sportswear often depicts Johnson's silhouette, wearing a tricorne hat.

Johnson appears as an antagonist as a secret member of the Templar Order in the 2012 video game Assassin's Creed III. He is instructed by the Templars to seize and control Native American lands and in retaliation he is killed by the game's Mohawk protagonist, Ratonhnhaké:ton. He also makes an appearance in the 2014 video game prequel Assassin's Creed Rogue where he allies and helps mentor the game's protagonist, Shay Patrick Cormac.

He is a prominent character in the 2007 book Manituana by Wu Ming and briefly features in Robert Louis Stevenson's novel, The Master of Ballantrae (1889).

Johnson was portrayed by Chris Wiggins in the 1990 television film Divided Loyalties, and by Pierce Brosnan in the 1993 television movie The Broken Chain.

Johnson was portrayed by actor Jeff Monahan in the PBS docudrama The War that Made America (2006). Monahan studied contemporary physical deportment and speaking in a northern Irish accent for the role.

Wilderness Empire (1968), by Allan W Eckert, tells Johnson's story through the device of historical fiction. Eckert bases his novel on historical documents but also creates imagined events and dialogs that make it accessible to the average reader.

== Ancestors ==
Ancestors of Sir William Johnson, 1st Baronet

8. Thomas MacShane
4. General William MacShane Johnson
9. Frances Fay
2. Christopher Johnson
10. James FitzSimons
5. Anna FitzSimons
1. Sir William Johnson
12. Oliver Warren
6. Michael Warren
13. Christina Roe
3. Anne Warren
14. Sir Christopher Aylmer, Baron Balrath
7. Catherine Aylmer
15. Margaret, Lady Plunkett

Baronetage of Great Britain
New creation	Baronet (of New York); 1755–1774	Succeeded by John Johnson
