= Covenant Chain =

Series of treaties between England and the Haudenosaunee

The Covenant Chain was a series of alliances and treaties developed during the seventeenth century, primarily between the Haudenosaunee Confederacy (Iroquois) and the British colonies of North America, with other Native American tribes added. First meeting in the New York area at a time of violence and social instability for the colonies and Native Americans, the English and Haudenosaunee councils and subsequent treaties were based on supporting peace and stability to preserve trade. They addressed issues of colonial settlement, and tried to suppress violence between the colonists and Indigenous, as well as among the Indigenous, from New England to the Colony of Virginia.

== History ==
The Covenant Chain is embodied in the Two Row Wampum of the Haudenosaunee, known as the people of the longhouse - Haudenosaunee. It was based in agreements negotiated between Dutch settlers in New Netherland (present-day New York) and the Five Nations of the Iroquois (or Haudenosaunee) early in the 17th century. Their emphasis was on trade with the Native Americans. As the historian Bernard Bailyn has noted, all the colonies, Dutch and English, were first established to create profits.

A representation of the original Two Row Wampum treaty belt.

Through the Beaver Wars in the seventeenth century, the Haudenosaunee conquered other tribes and territories for new hunting grounds and to take captives to add to their populations depleted from warfare and new European infectious diseases. The tribes in New England suffered even more depletion. The Haudenosaunee expanded their influence, conquering or displacing other tribes from Maritime Canada west to the Mississippi Valley, and from the Canadian Shield south to the Ohio Valley.

When the English took over New Netherland in 1664 and established the Province of New York, they renewed these agreements. Conflicts erupted in New England in King Philip's War in 1675, "the most destructive war" in seventeenth-century North America, in which more than 600 colonists and 3,000 Indians died. Nearly at the same time was Bacon's Rebellion in Virginia. Both resulted in widespread suffering and loss among Native Americans and colonists.

Because of the standing relationship with the Haudenosaunee and the extensive influence of the Five Nations, in August 1675, New York's governor Sir Edmund Andros asked them for help in ending regional conflicts of the time in New England and the Chesapeake. He worked with the Onondaga leader Daniel Garacontié.

The term "Covenant Chain" was derived from the metaphor of a silver chain holding the English sailing ship to the Haudenosaunee (Iroquois) Tree of Peace in the Onondaga Nation. A three-link silver chain was made to symbolize their first agreement. The links represent "Peace, Friendship and Respect" between the Haudenosaunee and the Crown. It was also the first written treaty to use such phrases as:

...as long as the sun shines upon the earth;
as long as the waters flow;
as long as the grass grows green, peace will last.

=== Treaties ===
They negotiated the signing of several treaties that expanded the number of tribes and colonies involved:

- A 1676 treaty between the Mohawk nation and the colonies of Massachusetts Bay and Connecticut which ended King Philip's War in New England, as the Mohawk denied Metacom gunpowder and attacked his winter camp. It also addressed relations between the Haudenosaunee and a number of other tribes, including the Mahican of the Hudson River, and the Nipmuc, Mohegan, and Massachusett of New England.
- A 1677 treaty between the Five Nations of the Haudenosaunee and the Lenape (Delaware), on one side, and the colonies of Virginia and Maryland, allied with the Susquehannock on the other, to obtain peace.

Many of the Susquehannock migrated north into western New York, re-settling with the Seneca and Onondaga of the Haudenosaunee.

The treaties marked a new era in colonial history, in which the Chesapeake had nearly eighty years of peace. New York and the Haudenosaunee became the focus of English Indian policy. In the mid-eighteenth century, Sir William Johnson, Superintendent of Indian Affairs for the Northern Department and based in central New York, had great influence and was knighted for his service. Through the early decades of the eighteenth century, New England continued to have conflicts with New France and its Abenaki allies, leading to years of raiding by both sides and ransoming of captives.

In these agreements, the colonies agreed to hold negotiations generally at Albany, New York, under the auspices of the New York governor, as the covenant had first been established there. As a result, according to the historian Daniel Richter, "Iroquois and New Yorkers played dominant but seldom dictatorial roles" in the maintenance of these treaties.

At a council meeting in 1684, Virginia Governor Lord Effingham used the phrase "covenant chain" to describe these agreements. The metaphor was continued by a Seneca speaker, who said: "Let the Chaine be Kept Cleane and bright as Silver that the great tree that is can not break it a peeces if it should fall upon itt."

Later colonial administrators assumed that these treaties granted the English sovereign control over the Haudenosaunee and other tribes involved in the chain. The Haudenosaunee did not agree with this and believed themselves at least to be equals. In a Covenant Chain council that took place in 1692, the Haudenosaunee leaders asserted:

You say that you are our father and I am your son...
...We will not be like Father and Son, but like Brothers.

=== Dissolution ===
The Covenant Chain continued until 1753, when the Mohawk, claiming to have been cheated out of lands rightfully theirs in New York, declared that the chain was broken.

Howard Zinn, in his "A People's History of the United States" discusses the taking of the Mohawk land:

"Before the Revolution, the Indians had been subdued by force in Virginia and in New England. Elsewhere, they had worked out modes of coexistence with the colonies. But around 1750, with the colonial population growing fast, the pressure to move westward onto new land set the stage for conflict with the Indians. Land agents from the East began appearing in the Ohio River valley, on the territory of a confederation of tribes called the Covenant Chain, for which the Haudenosaunee were spokesmen. In New York, through intricate swindling, 800,000 acres of Mohawk land were taken, ending the period of Mohawk-New York friendship. Chief Hendrick of the Mohawks is recorded speaking his bitterness to Governor George Clinton and the provincial council of New York in 1753: Brother when we came here to relate our Grievances about our Lands, we expected to have something done for us, and we have told you that the Covenant Chain of our Forefathers was like to be broken, and brother you tell us that we shall be redressed at Albany, but we know them so well, we will not trust to them, for they [the Albany merchants] are no people but Devils so ... as soon as we come home we will send up a Belt of Wampum to our Brothers the other 5 Nations to acquaint them the Covenant Chain is broken between you and us. So brother you are not to expect to hear of me any more, and Brother we desire to hear no more of you.

— Howard Zinn, "A Kind of Revolution", from A People's History of the United States

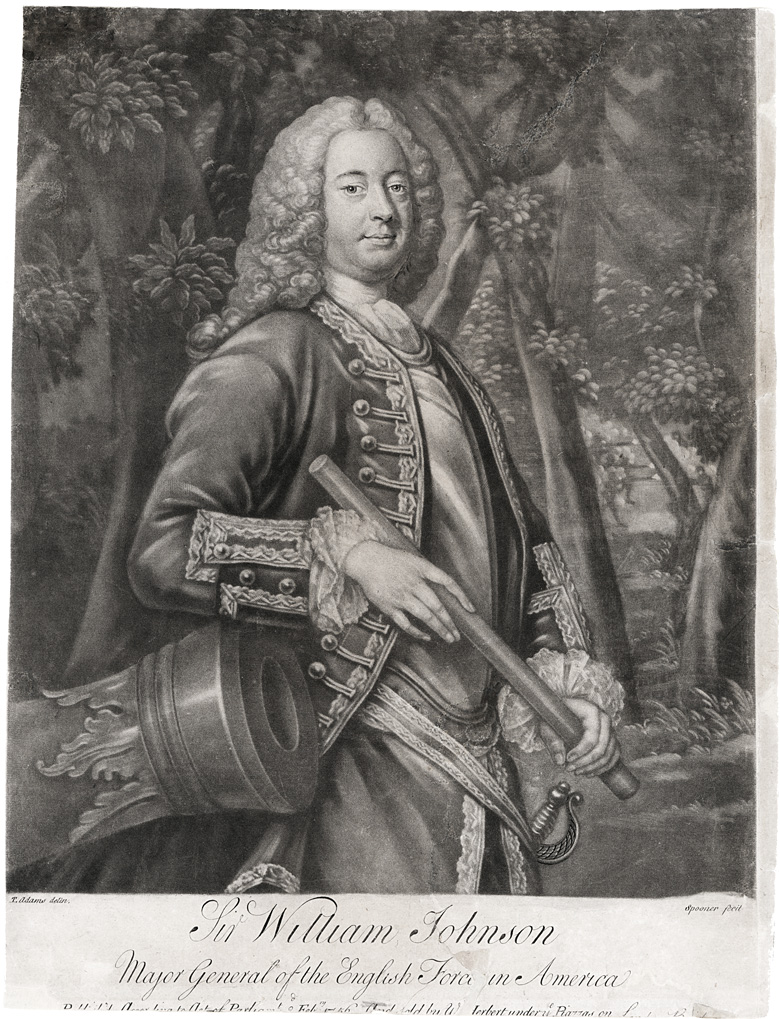
This mezzotint of William Johnson was published in London in 1756, just one year after his attempt to renew the Covenant Chain.

The Albany Congress was called to help repair the chain. Colonial delegates failed to work together to improve the diplomatic relationship with the Haudenosaunee, a serious shortcoming on the eve of the French and Indian War. As a result, the British government took the responsibility of Native American diplomacy out of the hands of the colonies and established the British Indian Department in 1755.

In a 1755 council with the Haudenosaunee, William Johnson, Superintendent of the Northern Department based in central New York, renewed and restated the chain. He called their agreement the "Covenant Chain of love and friendship", saying that the chain has been attached to the immovable mountains and that every year the British would meet with the Haudenosaunee to "strengthen and brighten" the chain. He developed great influence among the Haudenosaunee and was later knighted for his contributions to development in the Northeast.

== Commemoration ==
In June 2010, Queen Elizabeth II of Canada renewed the Covenant Chain Treaties by presenting eight silver hand bells each to Band Chiefs from Tyendinaga Mohawk Territory and Six Nations of the Grand River in commemoration of 300 years of the Covenant Chain. The bells were inscribed "The Silver Chain of Friendship 1710–2010" (which was a common term often used throughout history when the Chain was renewed).
