= Sir Peter Johnson, 7th Baronet =

Sir Peter Johnson Bt
- Born: Peter Colpoys Paley Johnson; 26 March 1930; London, England
- Died: 24 May 2003 (aged 73); Lymington, Hampshire
- Education: Wellington College, Berkshire
- Alma mater: Royal Military College of Science
- Spouses: Clare Bruce (m. 1956; div. 1972) Caroline Elisabeth Hodsoll (after 1973)
- Parent(s): Sir John Johnson, 6th Baronet; Carol Louise Glorney Haas
- Relatives: 4

Sir Peter Colpoys Paley Johnson, 7th Baronet of New York (26 March 1930 – 24 May 2003) was an English soldier, yachting enthusiast, and author.

== Early life ==
Johnson was born in London on 26 March 1930. He was the only son of Lt.-Col. Sir John Paley Johnson, 6th Baronet and the former Carol Louise Glorney Haas. From his parents marriage, he had one sibling, Wanda Helene Paley Johnson. His parents divorced in 1939 and his father remarried to Jasmine Lydia Bligh (daughter of Lt.-Col. Hon. Noel Gervase Bligh and granddaughter of Ivo Bligh, 8th Earl of Darnley), with whom he had another daughter, Sarah Jack Paley Johnson, Peter's younger half-sister. They divorced in 1947 and he married Joan Rosemary Cohen, daughter of Maj. Arthur Cohen, on 27 September 1949.

His maternal grandfather was Edmund Haas of New York, and his paternal grandparents were Captain Robert Warren Johnson (son of Vice Admiral John Ormsby Johnson and grandson of Charles Christopher Johnson) and Grace Isobel Paley (a daughter of barrister Algernon Herbert Paley).

He was educated at Wellington College, Berkshire and at the Royal Military College of Science.

== Career ==
Johnson was commissioned an officer in the Royal Artillery in 1949, serving in Egypt and Cyprus before he retired with the rank of Captain in 1961. He succeeded as the 7th Baronet Johnson, of New York, on 14 December 1975 following the death of his father. After the Army, he worked for a few years for the Bordon Chemical Co., before becoming director of Sea Sure Ltd., a yacht fittings manufacturing company in 1965. He co-founded the Nautical Publishing Company, serving as editor and director, until it was sold to Macmillans in 1981.

A yachting enthusiast who "made complex issues comprehensible to a discerning readership", who wrote fifteen titles, including Ocean Racing and Offshore Yachts, published in 1970, Boating Britain, published in 1973, Guinness Guide to Sailing, published in 1981, The Encyclopedia of Yachting, published in 1989, Yacht Clubs of the World, published in 1994, Yacht Rating, published in 1997, World Sailing Records, published in 2002 and Reed's Maritime Flags, published in 2002.

He also established the World Speed Sailing Record Council which became "the global authority for the ratification and recording of all such feats."

== Personal life ==
On 7 August 1956, Johnson married Clare Bruce, daughter of Nigel Patrick Bruce (a son of Rev. Robert Douglas Bruce) and Audrey Patricia Villiers Clarendon (a daughter of Rev. Owen Samuel Edward Clarendon). Before their divorce in 1972, they were the parents of:

- Marina Grace Johnson (b. 1960)
- Alison Fiona Johnson (b. 1961)
- Sir Colpoys Guy Matt Johnson, 8th Baronet (b. 1965), who married Marie Louise Carmel Holroyd, a daughter of John Holroyd, in 1990.

In 1973, he married, secondly, Caroline Elisabeth Hodsoll, daughter of Sir Eric John Hodsoll. Together, they were the parents of one son:

- Nicholas Frederick Johnson (b. 1977)

He died in Lymington, Hampshire, on 24 May 2003 after a long fight with cancer. He was succeeded in the baronetcy by his eldest son, Colpoys.

Baronetage of Great Britain
Preceded by John Paley Johnson	Baronet (of New York); 1975–2003	Succeeded by Colpoys Guy Matt Johnson
