= Mohawk Upper Castle Historic District =

Historic church in New York, United States

- U.S. National Register of Historic Places
- U.S. National Historic Landmark District
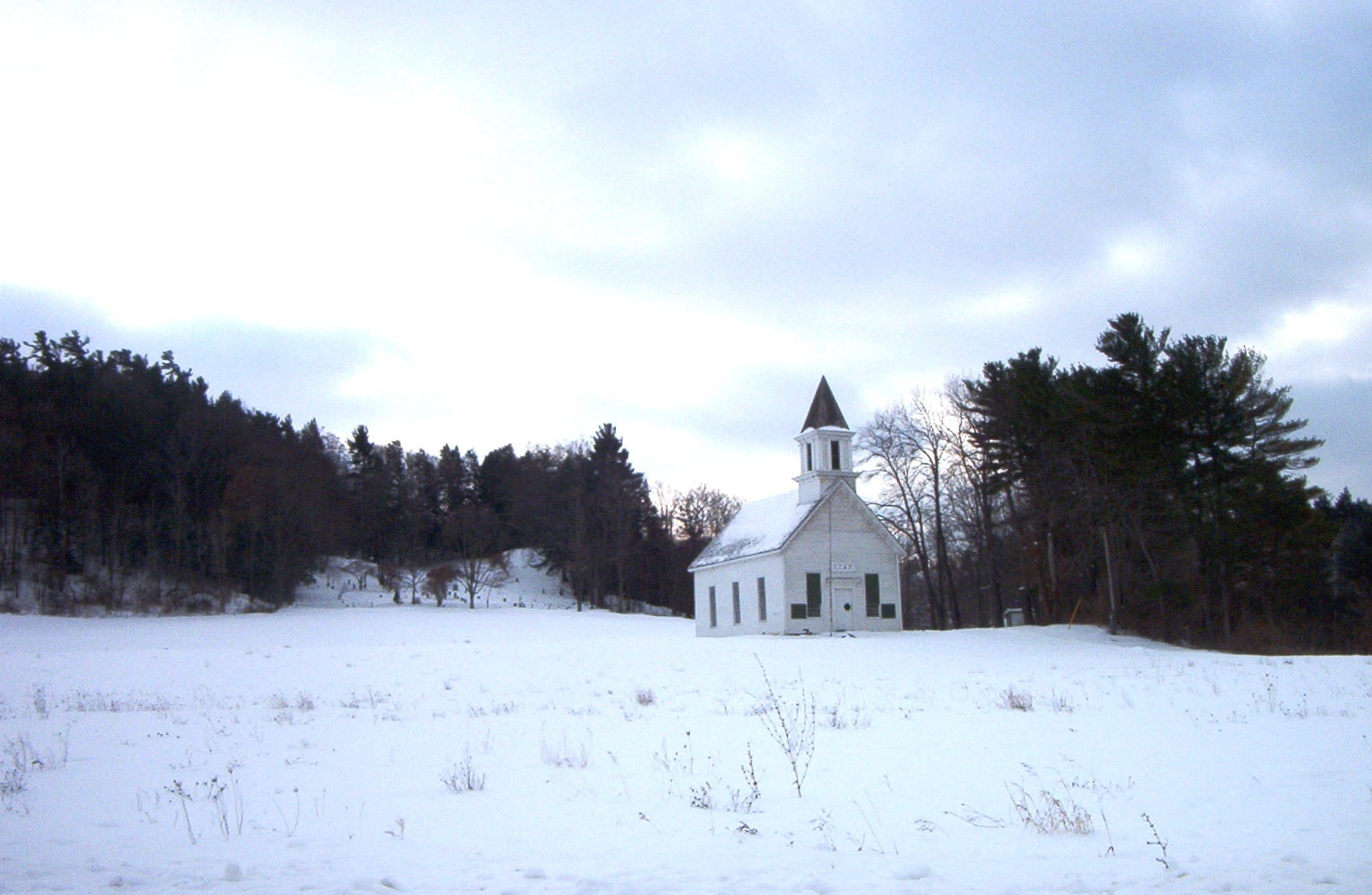
- Indian Castle Church viewed from Route 5S, December 2007
- Nearest city: Danube, New York
- Built: 1693
- NRHP reference No.: 93001621

Significant dates
- Added to NRHP: November 4, 1993
- Designated NHLD: November 4, 1993

Mohawk Upper Castle Historic District is a historic district in Herkimer County, New York that was declared a National Historic Landmark in 1993. Located south of the Mohawk River, it includes the Indian Castle Church, built in 1769 by Sir William Johnson, British Superintendent of Indian Affairs, as a missionary church for the Mohawk in the western part of their territory; the Brant Family Barn, a rare surviving example of Dutch colonial barns in the Mohawk Valley; as well as important archaeological site areas revealing life in Nowadaga, as the western part of the Mohawk village of Canajoharie was known. The fortified village was called the Upper Castle by European colonists.

Its name differentiates it from Lower Castle to the east, another fortified Mohawk village, known as Tionondoroge, near the confluence of Schoharie Creek and the Mohawk River. Fort Hunter was built here in 1712. The Schoharie Crossing State Historic Site, containing remains of a navigable aqueduct, is near the former village location.

== History and resources ==
The Mohawk concentrated their town life in the villages known as "castles" following the destructive raids by French Canadians and their Indian allies during King William's War of 1693. They reestablished their settlements in both areas, which were located south of the Mohawk River.

Indian Castle Church was built in 1769 as a missionary church to the Mohawk in this western settlement known as Canajoharie, by Sir William Johnson, British Superintendent of Indian Affairs, on land donated by Mary (Molly) Brant, his consort, and her younger brother Joseph Brant, both Mohawk leaders allied with Johnson. It has a nearby Mohawk cemetery, a contributing site. Following the Revolutionary War and the exodus of most Mohawk from New York to Canada, under pressure as allies of the defeated British, the church was used by a variety of Protestant congregations in the area. Dutch Reformed (1800–1820), an interdenominational Union Congregation, a "short-lived" Presbyterian congregation, and Lutherans from 1838-1855.

A new Union Church Society took over the church and accomplished some renovations beginning in 1855. It changed the orientation of the building, so that the short ends face north and south. The Society used the church until 1925. To save the property, local residents formed the Indian Castle Church Restoration and Preservation Society, and have raised funds for it during the years. Due to their efforts, it was listed on the National Register of Historic Places in 1971. The Society operates the property as a public historic site.

The Brant Family Barn is believed to have been constructed about 1754, at the time the family established the homestead. The houses later occupied by Mary Brant and her brother Joseph were both burned down during the Revolutionary War, as were most structures existing in the valley before the war. They migrated to Ontario, where they settled on the Six Nations Reserve.

This 49.6-acre tract was privately held and used primarily for agriculture. In 1940 Ralph Welden bought the property from the Green family, and it is still held by his descendants. They allowed archaeological assessments in the 1970s and 1980s, and have worked to preserve the land where substantial resources were found.
