= Old Fort Johnson =

Historic house in New York, United States

- Fort Johnson
- U.S. National Register of Historic Places
- U.S. National Historic Landmark
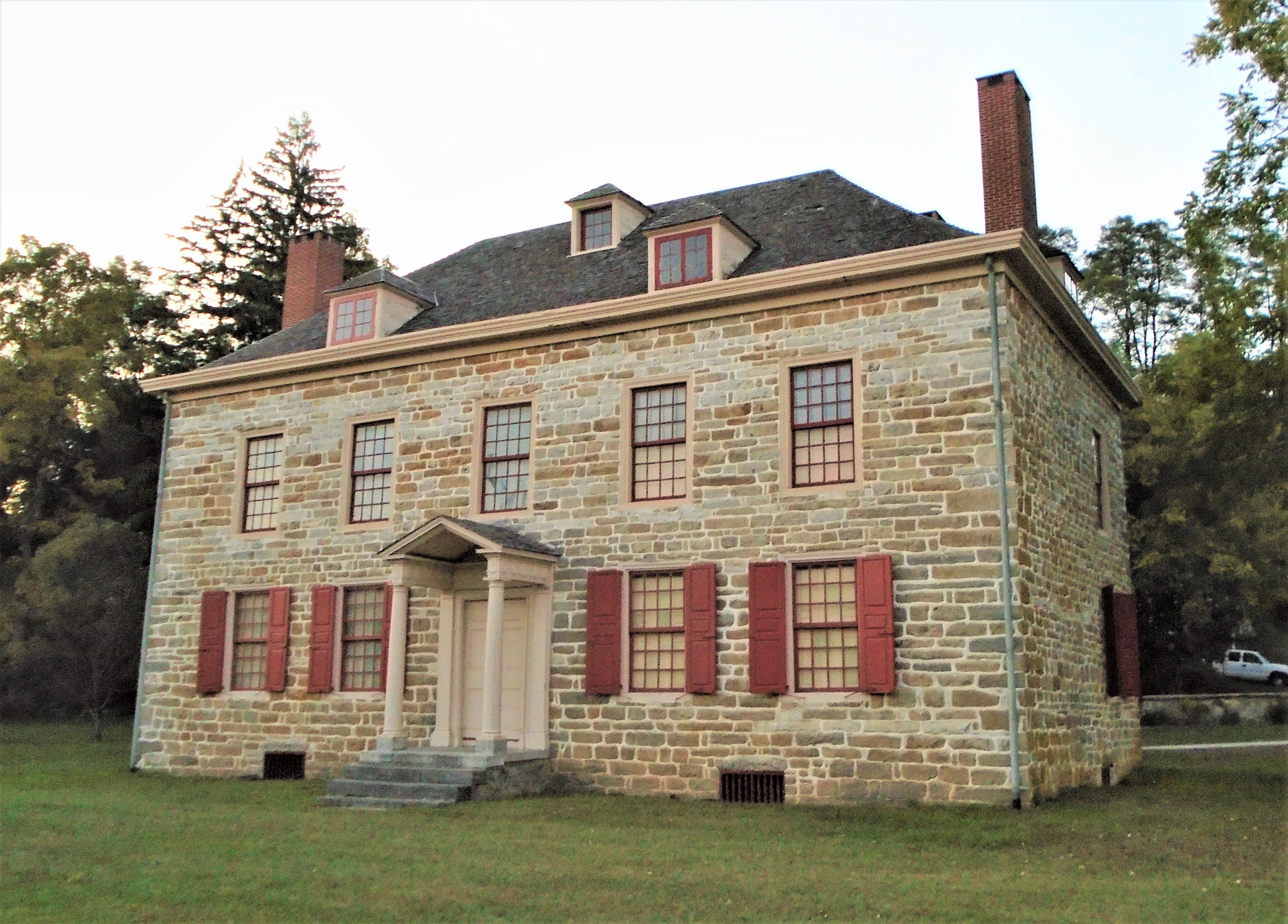
- (2020)
- Location: 2 Mergner Rd., Fort Johnson, NY
- Nearest city: Amsterdam
- Coordinates: 42°57′26″N 74°14′30″W
- Area: 1 acre (0.40 ha)
- Built: ca. 1749
- Architectural style: Georgian
- NRHP reference No.: 72000858

Significant dates
- Added to NRHP: November 28, 1972
- Designated NHL: November 28, 1972

Old Fort Johnson is a historic house museum and historic site at 2 Mergner Road (junction of New York State Routes 5 and 67) in Fort Johnson, New York. It is the site of Fort Johnson, a two-story stone house originally enclosed in fortifications built by Sir William Johnson about 1749. The fort served as Johnson's home, business office and trading center until 1763 when he moved to Johnson Hall in what is now Johnstown, New York. Sir William's son Sir John Johnson owned the house from 1763 until 1776, when it was confiscated by the local Committee of Safety. The house remains and is owned and operated as a museum by the Montgomery County Historical Society. It was designated a National Historic Landmark in 1972.

== Description ==
Old Fort Johnson is located at the center of the village of Fort Johnson, on the north side of NY Route 5 overlooking the Mohawk River just west of NY Route 67. The property, about 1 acre (0.40 ha) in size, is fringed on the front and east side by a low stone retaining wall. The house is a 2 1/2-story structure, built out of limestone and topped by a hip roof. Brick chimneys are located in the side walls, and the front face of the roof is pierced by three gabled dormers. The front facade is five bays wide, with a center entrance sheltered by a gabled portico supported by Doric columns. The interior follows a central hall plan, with a parlor and study on the left, and a large dining room and serving chamber on the right; the kitchen is located in the basement.

William Johnson came to what is now Upstate New York in 1738, establishing a sawmill nearby and engaging in trade with the local Iroquois. Johnson built this house about 1749, after King George's War ended. The house was surrounded by a wooden palisade during the French and Indian War. Johnson was influential in relations between the colonial government and the local Mohawk people, and was named the crown Superintendent of Indian Affairs in 1756. He moved further west, establishing Johnson Hall as his seat in 1763. This house became the home of his son John, who was a leading Loyalist during the American Revolutionary War. Both Fort Johnson and Johnson Hall were seized by the state and auctioned off due to the Johnson's opposition to independence. After passing through many owners, Fort Johnson was purchased in the 1920s by John Watts DePeyster and given to the Montgomery County Historical Society, which now operates it as a museum.

== See also ==
- List of National Historic Landmarks in New York
