= Indian Castle Church =

Historic church in New York, United States

- U.S. National Register of Historic Places
- U.S. Historic district – Contributing property
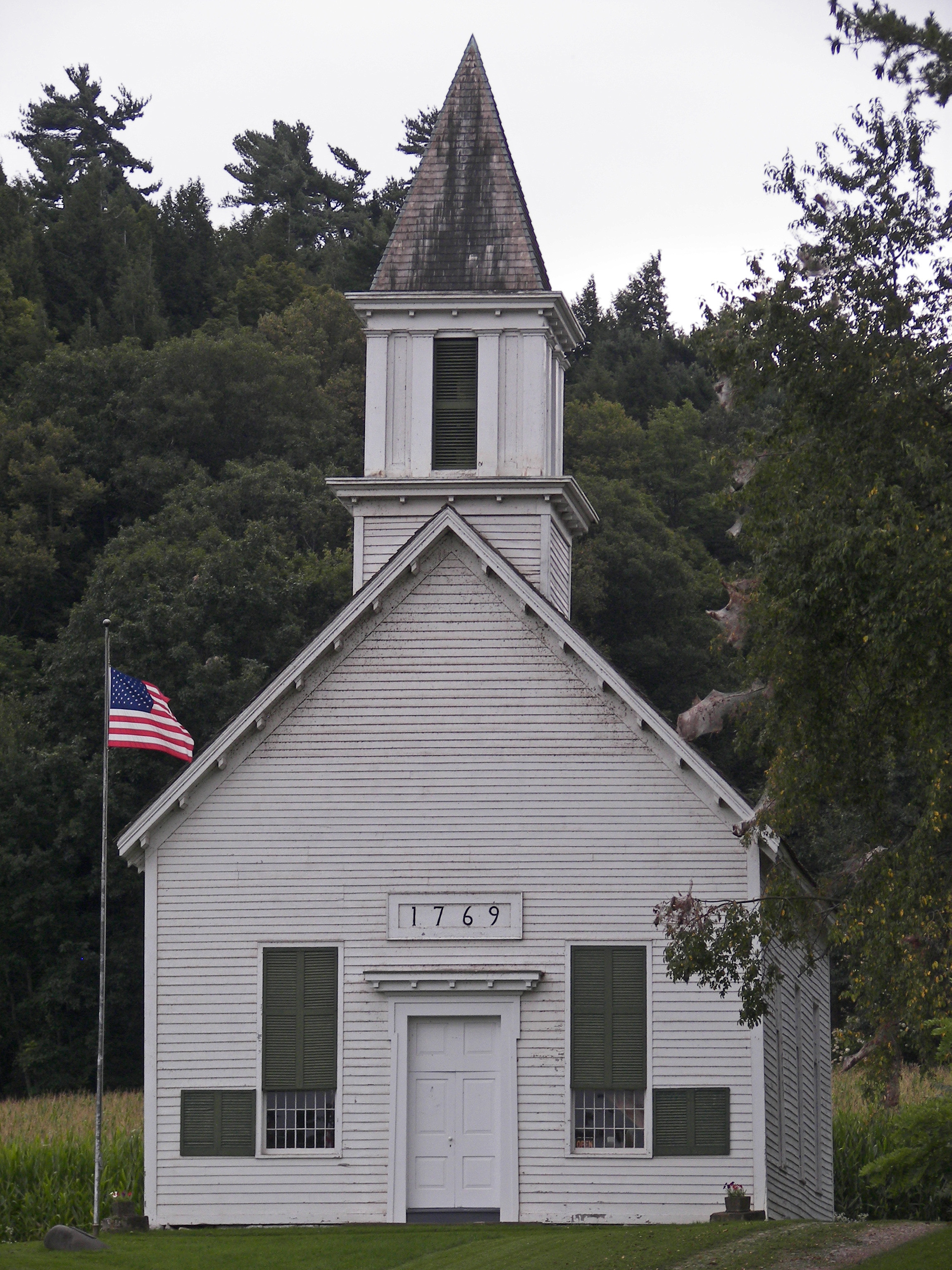
- Indian Castle Church, September 2009

- Location within New York Location within the United States
- Nearest city: Indian Castle, New York
- Coordinates: 43°0′10″N 74°46′40″W
- Area: 1 acre (0.40 ha)
- Built: 1769
- Architectural style: Colonial Revival, Gothic Revival
- NRHP reference No.: 71000540
- Added to NRHP: February 18, 1971

Indian Castle Church is a historic mission church at Indian Castle in Herkimer County, New York. The church is located on NYS Route 5S near present-day Danube. It is a one-story, rectangular wood-frame structure, clad in clapboard with a gable roof and steeple. To the rear of the church is a burial ground containing the remains of both Mohawks and Europeans.

It was erected in 1769 by Sir William Johnson, British Superintendent of Indian Affairs, as an Indian mission church for the Mohawk nation. They were the easternmost of the Five Nations of the Iroquois League, who occupied most of New York west of the Hudson River.

== Background ==
The land was donated by siblings Joseph and Molly Brant, two prominent Mohawk in their village of Canajoharie, located on the south side of the Mohawk River. Construction was done under the direction and at the expense of Sir William Johnson, Superintendent of Indian Affairs. Molly Brant was a longtime companion and common-law wife of Johnson. Her brother Joseph Brant became a prominent Mohawk military leader, allied with the British, during the American Revolutionary War and later led the Mohawk after their migration to Canada.

The church is located within what is now designated as the Mohawk Upper Castle Historic District, a National Historic Landmark. It is the only colonial Indian missionary church surviving in New York State. The church was listed on the National Register of Historic Places in 1971.

== See also ==
- List of the oldest buildings in New York
