= Johnson Hall State Historic Site =

- Johnson Hall
- U.S. National Register of Historic Places
- U.S. National Historic Landmark
- New York State Register of Historic Places
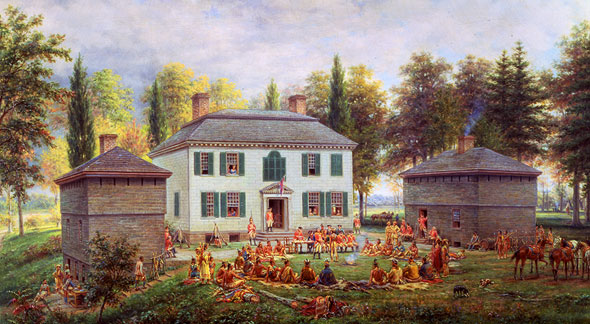
- A 1903 painting despicts the presentation of medals to the Six Nations Iroquois Confederacy in 1772

- Location within New York Location within the United States
- Location: Johnstown, New York
- Coordinates: 43°0′54″N 74°22′58″W
- Built: 1763
- Architect: Peter Harrison (architect)
- Architectural style: Georgian
- NRHP reference No.: 66000520
- NYSRHP No.: 03541.000030

Significant dates
- Added to NRHP: October 15, 1966
- Designated NHL: October 9, 1960
- Designated NYSRHP: June 23, 1980

Johnson Hall State Historic Site was the home of Sir William Johnson (1715–1774) an Irish pioneer who became the influential British Superintendent of Indian Affairs in the Province of New York, known for his strong relationship especially with the Mohawk and other Iroquois League nations.

Johnson Hall is located at Hall Avenue, West State Street and Johnson Avenue, in Johnstown, New York.

== History ==
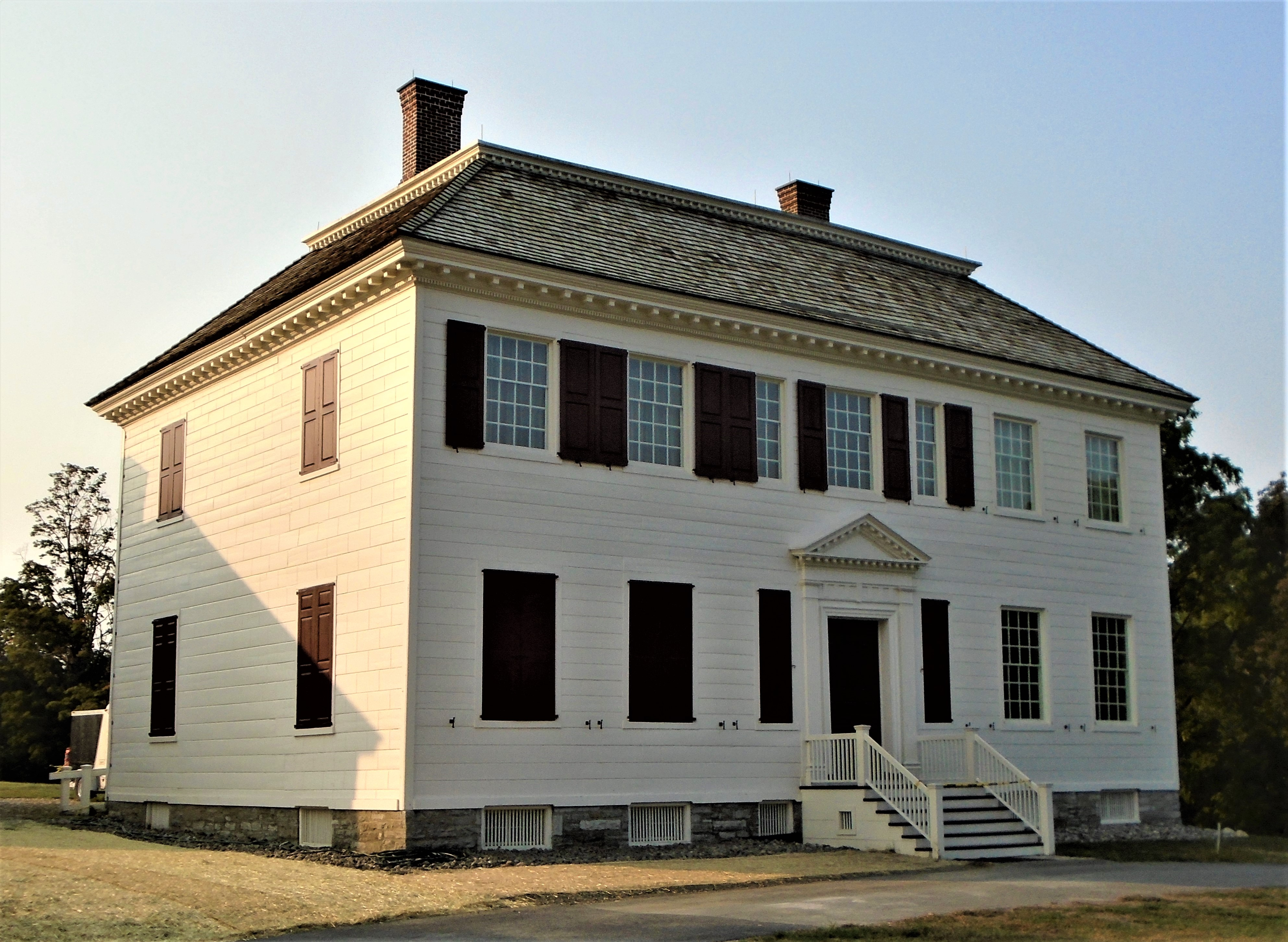
The mansion in 2020

The house was built seven miles from the Mohawk River, close to Hall Creek. Hall Creek provided water sufficient to power a sawmill and later a grist mill. Built of wood, the house frame was covered with wood planks intended to simulate stone. Johnson engaged leading colonial architect Peter Harrison to design the house; he hired the carpenter, Samuel Fuller, to build it. At least some of the ideas for the house came from the Builders' Companion magazine. Johnson also had two stone block houses built as defenses against attack on the frontier, as the British had just ended the Seven Years' War with the French. The stonehouses were also used for storage and other domestic uses.

Johnson founded Johnstown, New York, and came to own a 400,000-acre (160,000 ha) estate. Johnson moved here from Old Fort Johnson in 1763 and lived here until he died in 1774. The house was inherited by his son, John Johnson. During the American Revolution, the rebel government in New York seized Johnson Hall because the Johnsons had gone to Canada as Loyalists. In 1779 the state sold the house to Silas Talbot, a migrant from New England.

Through Johnson's efforts, the Hall was home to a Council fire, an important site of diplomacy with and between nations from the Atlantic coast to the Mississippi, and the entire Great Lakes basin. These nations included the Mohawk, Iroquois, Ojibwe, Shawnee, Delawares, Mississaugas, Wendat, Odaawaa,and Potowatomi and others.

It was used as a private residence by various owners until 1906, when the state bought it for preservation and interpretation as a house museum of the most important colonial landowner in the state. It received restoration in the early twentieth century and in the 1950s, to remove additions of the late nineteenth century and better reflect its original time. The historic site includes more than 18 acres of land. The mansion and the West Stonehouse are the only original structures on the site; the East Stonehouse is a reproduction.

The house was declared a National Historic Landmark in 1960.

== See also ==
- List of National Historic Landmarks in New York
- List of New York State Historic Sites
