= John Warren =

John Warren may refer to:

== Entertainment ==
- John F. Warren (1909–2000), American cinematographer
- John Warren (actor) (1916–1977), British screenwriter and actor
- John Warren (musician) (born 1938), Canadian baritone saxophonist and composer

== Medicine ==
- John Warren (surgeon, born 1753) (1753–1815), American surgeon during the Revolutionary War, founder of Harvard Medical School
- John Collins Warren (surgeon, born 1778) (1778–1856), American surgeon, founder of the New England Journal of Medicine, son of the above
- John Collins Warren (surgeon, born 1842) (1842–1927), American surgeon, son of Jonathan Mason Warren
- John Warren (anatomist, born 1874) (1874–1928), American professor of anatomy at Harvard University, son of the above
- Robin Warren (John Robin Warren, 1937–2024), Australian pathologist

== Military ==
- Sir John Borlase Warren (1753–1822), British admiral, politician, and diplomat
  - Sir John Borlase Warren (1800 ship), British merchant vessel named after the admiral
- Jean Baptiste François Joseph de Warren (1769–1830), known as John Warren, Italian-born British Army officer and surveyor and astronomer with the East India Company
- John Warren (British Army soldier) (died 1813), soldier, official and merchant in Upper Canada
- John E. Warren Jr. (1946–1969), U.S. Army officer and Vietnam War Medal of Honor recipient

== Politics ==
- John Warren (Dover MP) (died 1547), English member of Parliament for Dover
- John Warren (Upper Canada politician) (died 1832), merchant and politician in Upper Canada
- John Henry Warren (c. 1812–1885), English-born merchant and politician in Newfoundland
- John Holden Warren (1825–1901), Wisconsin state senator
- John Warren (Australian politician) (1830–1914), Australian pastoralist and politician
- John E. Warren, Mayor of Saint Paul, Minnesota, from 1863 to 1864
- John Warren (Georgia politician) (fl. 1868), Georgia state representative
- John Warren (trade unionist) (1895–1960), British trade unionist

== Religion ==
- John Warren (bishop) (1730–1800), Archdeacon of Worcester, Bishop of Saint David's, Wales, Bishop of Bangor, Wales
- John Warren (priest) (1767–1838), Dean of Bangor

== Science and engineering ==
- John Warren (mathematician) (1796–1852), English mathematician and Fellow of the Royal Society
- John Warren (mining engineer) (c. 1837–1910), English-born mining engineer and mine manager in Australia

== Sports ==
- John Warren (South African cricketer) (1873–1900), South African cricketer
- John A. Warren (1904–1981), American football and basketball coach at the University of Oregon
- John Warren (Indian cricketer) (fl. 1935–1936), Indian cricketer who played for Bengal
- John Warren (basketball, born 1947) (born 1947), American basketball player
- Johnny Warren (1943–2004), Australian soccer player and coach
- John Warren (punter) (born 1960), American football player
- John Warren (born 1960), racing manager of Queen Elizabeth's horses

== Others ==
- John Warren (convict) (c. 1826–1898), British convict transported to Western Australia
- John Warren, 3rd Baron de Tabley (1835–1895), English poet, numismatist, botanist and authority on bookplates
- John Warren (journalist) (born 1937), Canadian journalist who anchored the CBC Parliamentary Television Network

== See also ==
- Jonathan Mason Warren (1811–1867), American surgeon, pioneer of plastic and reconstructive surgery, son of John Collins Warren
