= Elizabeth Brant =

Native American

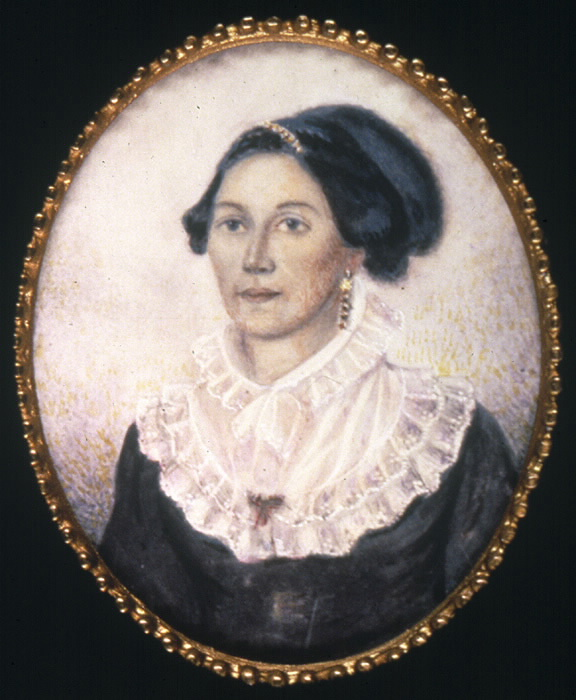
- Born: 1796; Upper Canada
- Died: April 25, 1845 (aged 48–49); Wellington Square, Canada West
- Spouse: William Johnson Kerr
- Children: William Simcoe Kerr
- Parent(s): Catharine Brant; Joseph Brant

Elizabeth Brant, commonly known as Elizabeth Kerr after her marriage to William Johnson Kerr, was a Clan Mother of the Six Nations of the Grand River. She was the daughter of Catharine Brant and Joseph Brant. In the matrilineal society of the Haudenosaunee, Elizabeth Brant inherited her status as a Yakoyaner (Clan Mother) from her mother.

Elizabeth Brant married William Johnson Kerr, the grandson of Molly Brant and Sir William Johnson. Together they had five children. Elizabeth and William Johnson Kerr were prominent residents of the British colony of Upper Canada, where they enjoyed substantial wealth and large land holdings. The British consul to New York, James Buchanan, described Elizabeth Brant in 1819 as “a charming, noble-looking Indian girl, dressed partly in the native and partly in the English costume.”

Like other members of her family, Elizabeth Brant was an important leader on the Grand River. Her brother John Brant was nominated by their mother Catharine Brant in 1828 as the new Tekarihogen, the most important civil chief of the Mohawk. As John never married, Elizabeth oversaw his household. After John's death in 1832, Catharine Brant nominated Elizabeth's son William Simcoe Kerr as the new Tekarihogen. Following Catharine's own death in 1837, Elizabeth Brant became the leading woman of the Mohawk nation on the Grand River.
