= William Johnson Kerr =

William Johnson Kerr (1787 – April 23, 1845) was a political figure in Upper Canada.

He was born in 1787, the son of Robert Kerr and grandson of Sir William Johnson. He was a captain in the Indian Department and with John Brant and John Norton, he led a group of Six Nations warriors at the Battle of Queenston Heights. He was also involved in the Battle of Beaver Dams and other battles during the War of 1812. He was captured by the Americans at the Battle of Lundy's Lane and was released after the war. He was named justice of the peace in the Niagara District in 1817 and in the Gore District in 1828. In 1818, he participated in meetings organized by Robert Gourlay and presented a list of grievances to Lieutenant Governor Sir Peregrine Maitland. He represented the 2nd riding of Lincoln in the Legislative Assembly of Upper Canada from 1820 to 1824. He served as superintendent for the Burlington Bay Canal project, alongside Michael Tipson. In 1832, no longer sympathetic to the reform cause, he took part in an assault on William Lyon Mackenzie in Hamilton and was charged and fined.

He had married Elizabeth Brant, the daughter of Joseph Brant (Thayendanegea), and, on John Brant's death in 1832, his son William Simcoe was chosen as Brant's successor. Kerr also led members of the Six Nations during the Upper Canada Rebellion.

He died at Wellington Square (Burlington) in 1845.
