= John Norton (Mohawk chief) =

Military leader of Haudenosaunee warriors

John Norton Teyoninhokarawen
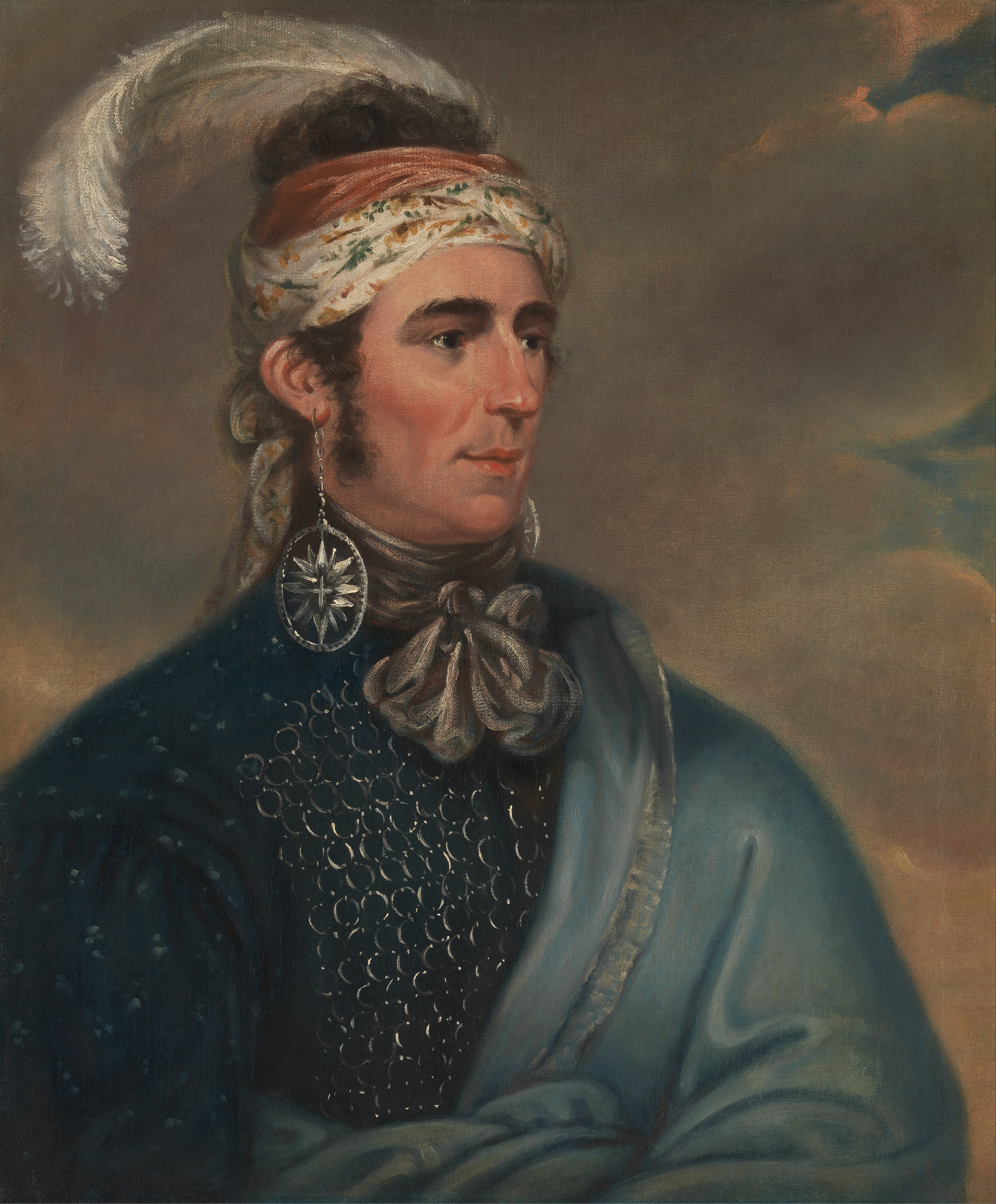
- Portrait of Norton
- Born: Estimated 1770; Unknown, likely Scotland
- Died: Estimated 1827; Unknown, likely Canada
- Spouse: Catherine (Haudenosaunee woman of Six Nations Reserve)

John Norton or Teyoninhokarawen (born c. 1770, Scotland (?) – died c. 1827, Upper Canada (?)) was a Mohawk chief, Indian Department interpreter and a school master. He was adopted by the Mohawk at about age 30 at their major reserve in Canada. After deserting the British military in the late 18th century, he became a military leader of Haudenosaunee warriors in the War of 1812 on behalf of Great Britain against the United States. Commissioned as a major, he led warriors from the Six Nations of the Grand River into battle against American invaders at Queenston Heights, Stoney Creek, and Chippawa.

Likely born and educated in Scotland, he had a Scottish mother and a Cherokee father. His father was born in Keowee circa 1740, and was saved by British soldiers when they burned the town during the Anglo-Cherokee War. They took him to England and placed him with an English family. As an adult with the baptized surname Norton, he married a Scottish woman, whom he had a son with.

The junior John Norton joined the British Army, serving in Ireland before being assigned to Lower Canada after the American Revolutionary War. While there he became interested in the Six Nations of Grand River, ultimately learning the Mohawk language and culture, and being adopted into a family of the tribe. In 1804 on a diplomatic trip representing the Haudenosaunee to England, he translated the Gospel of John into Mohawk for the British and Foreign Bible Society. This work was distributed in Upper Canada beginning in 1806.

Norton traveled in the American Southeast in 1809–1810, visiting many Cherokee towns and meeting some of his father's relatives. He documented much about Cherokee culture and included this material in his journal, which primarily recounted events of the War of 1812. It is unique for his perspective on the war as an acculturated Mohawk raised in the British Isles. The memoir, The Journal of Major John Norton, 1816, was not published until 1970 in an annotated edition by The Champlain Society; other annotated versions have also been published, including the Society's 2011 version.

== Early life ==
John Norton was likely born in Scotland in the early 1760s to a Scottish mother and an English father of Cherokee descent. The elder Norton, born in Keowee, had been saved as a boy by British soldiers, after they burned his home village of Keowee during the Anglo-Cherokee War. They took him back to England, where he was raised in an English family and given the surname Norton. He is believed to have married a Scottish woman, and they had a son known as John Norton.

The younger Norton began to serve as an apprentice to a printer, but ran away to join the army. He was assigned to Scotland, where he married. Next he was stationed in Ireland, where there were numerous Scots and border English immigrants, forming the Anglo-Irish ethnic group. In 1785 he was assigned to Lower Canada (modern-day Quebec) after the conclusion of the American Revolutionary War.

While stationed with his regiment at Niagara (Upper Canada) in 1787, Norton deserted the army but was subsequently pardoned and formally discharged. For a time, he taught at the Mohawk settlement of Tyendinaga on the Bay of Quinte, west of Kingston, Ontario. In 1791 he traveled through the Ohio Valley of the United States as a trader, establishing many contacts.

During this time, Norton became increasingly involved with the Haudenosaunee of the Six Nations of the Grand River reserve. In 1794, he returned to Fort Niagara, where he served as an interpreter for the British Indian department. He became known to Joseph Brant, the prominent Mohawk Nation leader, who became his mentor. While in his early 30s, Norton was adopted into a Mohawk family and clan, with Brant serving as his adoptive uncle.

Norton was given the Mohawk name of Teyoninhokarawen (roughly translated as "open door") to mark this passage. He settled in the Grand River reserve in Ontario. There he married Catherine, a First Nations woman from one of the six Haudenosaunee nations.

Before the Canada (Constitutional) Act of 1791, on the authority of the Haldimand Proclamation, John Norton acted as interpreter in the transaction of farm land granted to 10 recipients.

== Mohawk chief ==
Norton was strongly influenced by Joseph Brant (Thayendanega), the most prominent Mohawk chief, who had led much of the tribe through the end of the American Revolution and their resettlement in Upper Canada. Norton became a protégé of Brant, learning the Mohawk language and culture; he was adopted into the people as Thayendanega's nephew. Later he was appointed as a "Pine Tree Chief", in a public ceremony, according to Haudenosaunee custom. This was an honorary position and was not within the hereditary line.

Norton supported Brant's efforts to make the new settlements at Grand River yield more revenues for the Haudenosaunee, especially his plan to lease land to settlers in order to develop it in a mutually beneficial way. The Haudenosaunee were in transition to the kind of settled agricultural community which was supported by the British colonial government. By 1796 Brant felt he had to compete with the reserves established at Buffalo Creek in New York for the Seneca and Tyendinaga for Mohawk at the Bay of Quinte in order to attract more Haudenosaunee peoples to settle at Great River. On the other side of the border in the United States, the Onondaga and Seneca were receiving annuities for the land they had ceded to the US government.

Unable to develop the lands rapidly enough for agriculture, Brant proposed leasing them to settlers; he was also worried that European-Canadian settlers would otherwise squat on the Haudenosaunee lands and gain control. The British colonial governor John Graves Simcoe wanted all sales or leases handled by the colonial government. "[B]y stereotyping Indians as naive primitives, colonial officials frustrated native attempts to exploit the commercial potential of their land." He opposed the idea of having whites lease from the Mohawk and used William Claus, deputy superintendent of the Six Nations at Grand River, to carry out his policy. With the approval of the Mohawk but not the British, in 1798 Brant sold major blocks of unused land, with revenues to be invested in a British-Canadian bank to yield an annuity for the Mohawk people. Brant died in 1807.

=== Bible translator ===
In the spring of 1804, Teyoninhokarawen (John Norton), went to England to negotiate treaties with the British government on behalf of the Haudenosaunee. At the request of the British and Foreign Bible Society, he translated the Gospel of John into Mohawk. His work represented a number of firsts for the newly formed Bible Society: its first translation, first publication, and first distribution in a foreign land when it was sent to Canada.

In the Mohawk Chapel at Brantford, Ontario, a memorial stained-glass window portrays the 1806 distribution of the Gospel in Mohawk. The bottom panel of the window is inscribed with Norton's preface to his translation: "Let us strictly adhere to what the Lord has transmitted to us in the Holy Scriptures, that thereby the unbelievers may know that love we bear the commandments of God." (from a bookmark produced by the Canadian Bible Society)

=== To Cherokee country ===
Between 1809 and 1810 Norton had a lengthy trip to the American Southeast, where he traveled through the still extensive Cherokee territory, in part to try to find his father's people. He did meet relatives and was accepted as Cherokee when they learned his story. The people were under pressure from land encroachment by settlers and state governments, particularly Georgia.

Norton kept detailed accounts of what he saw and described Cherokee towns and culture in his The Journal of Major John Norton, 1816. This journal was edited by Carl F. Klinck and James J. Talman, and republished in 1970 as part of the General Series of the Champlain Society.

=== War of 1812 ===
Norton stayed active with the Mohawk after Brant's death, although he had to deal with intervention from Claus. The latter had been promoted in 1800 to deputy superintendent of the Indian Department of Upper Canada. Claus courted the Mohawk and other local tribes to gain their alliance in a period of growing tensions with the United States after 1807. Norton led a handful of Six Nations warriors into battle in Tecumseh's offensive in 1811 against the Americans at Tippecanoe.

When the War of 1812 between Britain and the United States began, Norton was quick to join British General Isaac Brock at Detroit, despite the official neutrality of the Canadian Six Nations. Following Brock's success at Detroit, more Six Nations warriors joined the British forces as allies. Their timely arrival at Queenston Heights, under the leadership of Major Norton, John Brant (Joseph's son), and Lieutenant Kerr of the Indian Department, was crucial to British victory. William Claus also commanded a unit there.

The following year (1813), Norton and his warriors covered the British retreat to Burlington Heights (present-day Hamilton, Ontario) after the Americans took Fort George. The First Nations warriors provided scouts before a successful night attack at the Battle of Stoney Creek, and contributed to the rout of the Americans at the Battle of Beaver Dams.

Following Queenston Heights, Norton continued to lead larger bands of Haudenosaunee warriors into several of the war's most significant battles. His journal, published under the title The Journal of Major John Norton, 1816, offers one of the most thorough firsthand accounts of the War of 1812. Norton included in the journal an account of his earlier travel to the Cherokee in the American Southeast around 1809-1810. He described their settlements and culture at the start of their final golden age before the Trail of Tears in the late 1830s and forced removal west of the Mississippi River to Indian Territory. Norton always intended his journal as a document for publication.

Historian Carl Benn addresses the question of "how Mohawk" Norton was and what viewpoint his journal of the War of 1812 reflects. He notes that Norton's formative years were spent in Scotland, with a Scots mother and a Cherokee father who was raised from childhood with the English. Norton was not adopted by the Mohawk until after the age of 30, but was very close to his mentor Joseph Brant. Benn concludes that, "by the Mohawk standards of the period, John Norton was a Mohawk." The tribe had a tradition of incorporating persons of other ancestries into their culture, although such adoptions usually were of more malleable children and young women. Benn noted that some of Norton's "adversaries used his origins to defame him."

== Later years ==
Norton's final years are a mystery. There were suggestions that he had left Canada and moved as far as Laredo, Mexico. His date of death is unknown but his last mention in records was in 1826. The Champlain Society gave his death date as 1827.

An existing manuscript of John Norton's Journal is the property of His Grace the twelfth Duke of Northumberland. It is contained in two large notebooks in the library of Alnwick Castle at Alnwick, Northumberland.
