= Sophia Pooley =

Sophia Burthen Pooley (c. 1772 – 1860) was a formerly enslaved African American in New York before being forcibly brought to the Canadas by Mohawk chief Joseph Brant. Her testimony, documented in American abolitionist Benjamin Drew's 1856 book The Refugee: or Narratives of the Fugitive Slaves in Canada is considered to be one of the only works regarding slavery in Canada which contained first-person accounts from enslaved people.

== Biography ==
Pooley was born into slavery about 1772 at Fishkill, New York, to Oliver and Dinah Burthen. While Pooley states in her testimony that she was 7 years old when she was kidnapped by slavers, other sources indicate that she was 12 or 13 at the time. What Pooley recounted in later years was that, as a child, she was playing in currant bushes in Fishkill with her sister before being blindfolded by the son-in-laws of their owner and delivered to slave traders going into what was then known as Upper Canada. Her sister's situation remains unknown after their joint kidnapping.

Pooley was brought to the Niagara region around 1778 to be sold to Mohawk chieftain Joseph Brant, who was a founding leader and early settler known as Burlington, Ontario. She lived with Brant near the Six Nations of the Grand River for around 20 years with other slaves of his. Pooley's experience has been described as an isolated one, as she may have been one of the only Black woman in Southern Ontario at the time of her enslavement. During her stay, Pooley learned how to speak Mohawk, and went on hunting trips with Brant's family apart from her normal duties. Pooley recalled her childhood friendship with Brant's daughters, Peggy, Mary, and Katy, indicating closeness to the family even though she was retained as a slave. She also described Brant's third wife Catherine's abuse towards her, calling the woman a "barbarous creature" after she attacked Pooley and delivered serious facial wounds to her.

Shortly before Brant's death, Pooley was then sold to and enslaved by a man named Samuel Hatt in 1807, who had paid $100 for her. Pooley lived in Ancaster with Hatt as a slave for a number of years, even after slavery was abolished in Canada. In 1833, she recounted the incident when she was told she was free under the Slavery Abolition Act 1833, and how Hatt "did not stop me—he said he could not take the law into his own hand." Pooley later left and moved to what is now known as Queen's Bush, Waterloo.

In 1855, American abolitionist Benjamin Drew traveled to 14 Black communities in Canada West, for the purpose of collecting several former slaves' testimonies regarding "their experiences of actual workings of slavery." Pooley, thought to be in her late nineties, gave what is the only existing first-person narrative of an enslaved person in Canada to Drew. Drew's book, The Refugee: or Narratives of the Fugitive Slaves in Canada, was then published in 1856, Pooley's testimony among 113 other interviews that Drew chose to include at the time of publication. Drew's depiction of Pooley's account has been questioned, as he maintained a narrative that she had fled as a fugitive from the United States to Upper Canada, instead of her experience of being transported to Canada under chattel slavery.

Pooley had married a Black farmer in Waterloo, Robert Pooley, but the marriage ended when her husband left Pooley for a white woman. There is no indication from Pooley's narrative or historical sources that she had any children.

Pooley died, in her late nineties, in 1860 at Peel Township.

== Legacy ==
Pooley's life story was included in the 2009 exhibit of Enslaved Africans in Upper Canada held by the Archives of Ontario at the Royal Ontario Museum. The Joseph Brant Museum, a replica of Brant's original residency where Pooley lived as a domestic slave, held presentations in 2014 to provide interpretations to Pooley's testimony in The Refugee.

There have been proposals to have a permanent plaque for Pooley for the City of Hamilton since 2019. There were arrangements to unveil the initiative during Black History Month in 2020, but were halted due to quarantine for COVID-19. Former Art Gallery of Ontario curator and historian, Andrew Hunter, was contacted by city of Hamilton officials regarding the municipal plaque in 2019. Hunt ended up with multiple bylaw fines in his personal signs regarding Pooley's life, as delays continued to highlight the city of Hamilton's history about colonialism and slavery. In 2023, Pooley was one of 16 Black Hamiltonians featured on city walk banners in Hamilton's Black Month History initiative We Are Hamilton — Black History Remembered. The permanent municipal plaque is still underway with Hamilton Civic Museums collaborating with the Afro Canadian Caribbean Association regarding the project.

== See also ==
- African Canadians
- Slavery in Canada
