= Catharine Brant =

Clan Mother of the Mohawk nation

- Ahdohwahgeseon
- Born: Catharine Croghan, Ahdohwahgeseon ca. 1759; Mohawk Valley, New York
- Died: November 23, 1837 (aged about 78); Brantford, Upper Canada
- Spouse: Joseph Brant (m. 1779; died 1807)
- Children: Jacob Brant; John Brant; Catherine Brant; Margaret Brant; Mary Brant; Elizabeth Brant

Catharine Brant (c.1759–1837), also known as Ahdohwahgeseon, was a clan mother of the Mohawk nation. She was the third wife of Joseph Brant and an important leader among the Six Nations of the Grand River.

== Family background ==
Catharine was the daughter of George Croghan, a deputy agent in the British Indian Department. On her mother's side, Catharine came from a noble Mohawk family. In the matrilineal society of the Haudenosaunee, this made Catharine a Yakoyaner (Clan Mother), and gave her the right to nominate the Tekarihogen, the most important civil chief of the Mohawk.

== Removal to Canada ==
During the American Revolutionary War, many Mohawks sought refuge at the British post of Niagara to escape U.S. destruction of Haudenosaunee villages. It was at Niagara that Catharine married Joseph Brant sometime during the winter of 1779–1780. Following the British defeat in the war, Catharine and Joseph Brant relocated with many other Indigenous families to a new homeland on the Grand River in the Province of Ontario.

In 1795, Joseph Brant received a grant of 700 acres at Burlington Beach, where he relocated with his family sometime around 1802. Here the Brants lived in a mansion staffed by numerous slaves, many of whom had been taken as prisoners during the American Revolution. In all, Joseph Brant owned some 40 enslaved persons, making the Brant family one of the most substantial slaveholders in Canadian history.

Joseph Brant died at his Burlington Bay home in 1807.

== Later life ==
After Joseph's death, Catharine returned to the Grand River where she continued to be an important leader. In 1828, she appointed her son John Brant to the position of Tekarihogen. After John died in the cholera epidemic of 1832, Catharine nominated her grandson, Walter Kerr, who was the son of her daughter Elizabeth Brant and William Johnson Kerr.

Catharine died on the Grand River in 1837. Until the end of her life, she was an influential leader among the Six Nations and a staunch advocate for the maintenance of their longstanding traditions in the midst of settler society.
