= John Warren (Upper Canada politician) =

Upper Canada merchant and politician

John Warren (died September 5, 1832) was a merchant and political figure in Upper Canada. He represented Haldimand in the Legislative Assembly of Upper Canada from 1831 to 1832.

He was the son of John Warren, customs collector at Fort Erie. Warren, who lived in Bertie Township, operated a ferry between Fort Erie and what is now Buffalo, New York. He served as an officer in the militia, reaching the rank of colonel. Warren was also a justice of the peace for the Niagara District and succeeded his father as customs collector at Fort Erie in 1815. He was elected to the assembly in an 1831 by-election held after the election of John Brant was overturned. Warren died in office in September of the following year.
