= John Warren (anatomist, born 1874) =

American anatomist (1874–1928)

John Warren (September 6, 1874 – July 17, 1928) was a professor of anatomy at Harvard University, as well as its University Marshal.

Warren was the son of John Collins Warren Jr., grandson of Jonathan Mason Warren, great-grandson of John Collins Warren, and great-great-grandson of Harvard Medical School founder John Warren. He graduated from Harvard Medical School in 1900.

He was an assistant, then a Demonstrator, in Harvard's Anatomy Department, then Assistant Professor (1908–15) and finally Associate Professor from 1915 on.

In 1911 he was appointed Harvard's University Marshal.

Warren was coauthor of An Outline of Practical Anatomy (1924, with Alexander S. Begg), and author of Warren's Handbook of Anatomy (published posthumously, 1930).
