= John Warren (South African cricketer) =

South African cricketer

Personal information
- Born: 8 February 1873; Kei Road, Cape Colony
- Died: 12 December 1900 (aged 27); Salisbury, Rhodesia
- Source: Cricinfo, 2 April 2016

John Warren (8 February 1873 – 31 December 1900) was a Cape Colony cricketer. He played three first-class matches for Border in 1897/98.
