= John Warren (British Army soldier) =

John Warren (before 1755 – May 1813) was a soldier, official and merchant in Upper Canada.

Warren served in the British army from 1755; in 1778, he was appointed commissary at Fort Erie. In 1788, he was named justice of the peace for the Nassau District and, in 1790, a road commissioner for the district. Warren was named to the district land board in 1791 and, in the following year, to the land board for Lincoln County. In 1797, he was named to the Heir and Devisee Commission, which dealt with transfers of land title that occurred due to inheritance, sale or exchange of title. Warren also served as lieutenant-colonel for the 3rd Lincoln Militia. He was customs collector at Fort Erie from 1801 until his death at Fort Erie in 1813.

His son John served in the Upper Canada assembly and also succeeded his father as customs collector.
