= John Warren (Indian cricketer) =

Indian cricketer

Personal information
- Full name: John Warren

John Warren was an Indian cricketer who played for Bengal. He was a right-handed batsman.Warren made a single first-class appearance for the team, in the 1935–36 season, against Central Provinces and Berar. Batting as an opener, he scored 3 runs in the first innings, and 66 runs in the second, one of two half-centuries in Bengal's second innings.
