= Haldimand Proclamation =

Proclamation decree of Canada

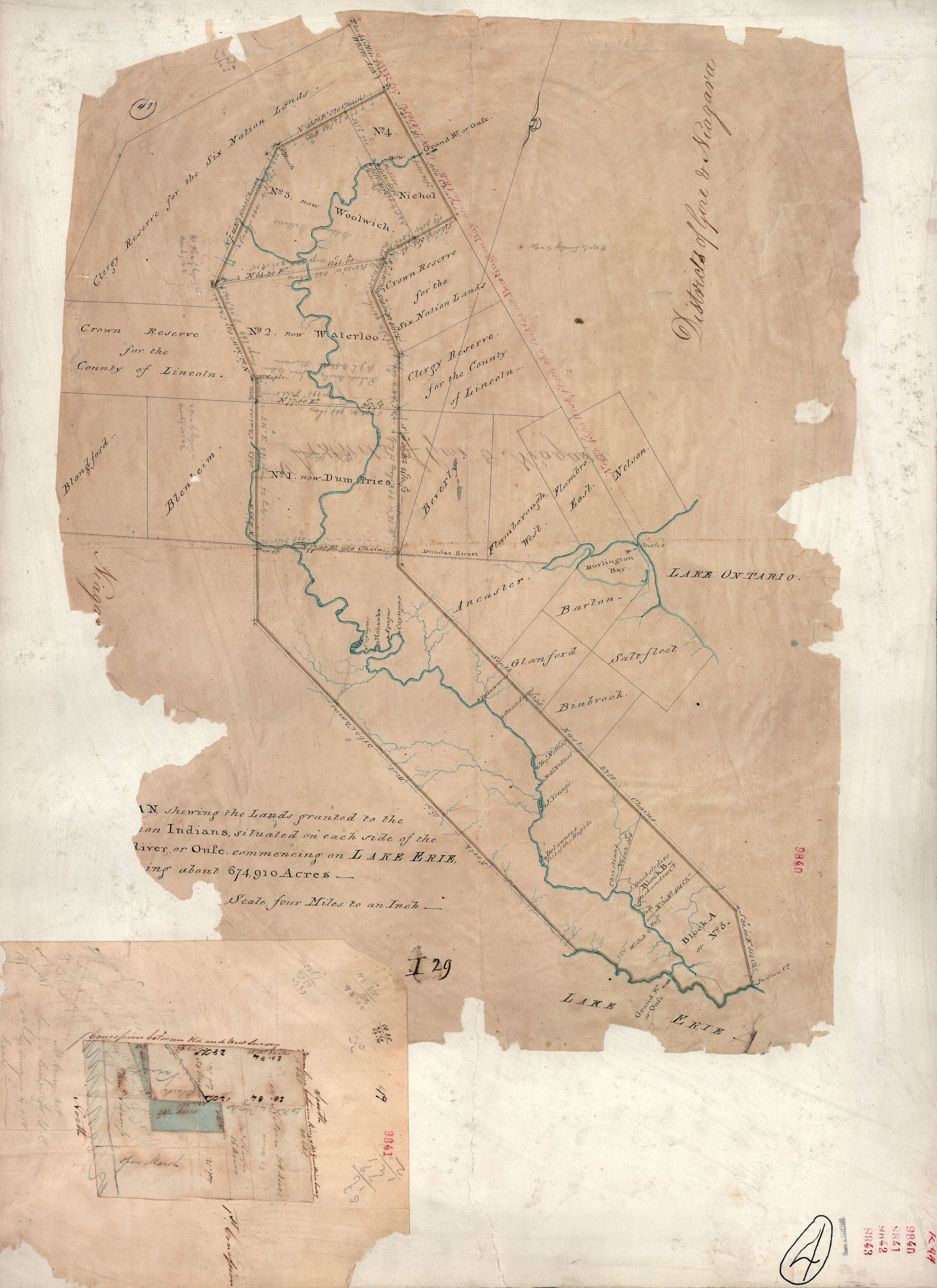
Thomas Ridout survey of 1821

The Haldimand Proclamation was a decree that granted land to the Mohawk (or Kanien'kehà:ka) (Mohawk nation) who had served on the British side during the American Revolution. The decree was issued by the Governor of the Province of Quebec, Frederick Haldimand, on October 25, 1784, three days after the Treaty of Fort Stanwix was signed between others of the Six Nations and the American government. The granted land had to be purchased from the Mississaugas of the Credit whose traditional territory spans much of modern-day Southwestern Ontario. On May 22, 1784, Col. John Butler was sent to negotiate the sale of approximately 3,000,000 acres of land located between Lakes Huron, Ontario, and Erie for £1180.00 from the Mississaugas of the Credit. Of the land ceded, some 550,000 acres were granted to the Mohawk nation in the Haldimand Proclamation. The sale by the Mississaugas of the Credit is also referred to as the "Between the Lakes Treaty."

== Proclamation text ==
The text of the proclamation reads:

Whereas His Majesty having been pleased to direct that in consideration of the early attachment to his cause manifested by the Mohawk Indians, and of the loss of their settlement which they thereby sustained—that a convenient tract of land under his protection should be chosen as a safe and comfortable retreat for them and others of the Five Nations, who have either lost their settlements within the Territory of the American States, or wish to retire from them to the British—I have at the earnest desire of many of these His Majesty's faithful Allies purchased a tract of land from the Indians situated between the Lakes Ontario, Erie and Huron and I do hereby in His Majesty's name authorize and permit the said Mohawk Nation and such others of the Five Nation Indians as wish to settle in that quarter to take possession of and settle upon the Banks of the River commonly called Ours [Ouse] or Grand River, running into Lake Erie, allotting to them for that purpose six miles deep from each side of the river beginning at Lake Erie and extending in that proportion to the head of the said river, which them and their posterity are to enjoy for ever."

Given under my hand and seal at arms, at the Castle of St Lewis at Quebec, this twenty-fifth day of October one thousand seven hundred and eighty-four and in the twenty-fifth year of the reign of Our Sovereign Lord George The Third by the Grace of God of Great Britain, France and Ireland, King, Defender of the Faith and so forth.

Fredk Haldimand

By His Excellency's Command

R. Mathews

== Background ==
Mohawk Joseph Brant and Guy Johnson, who had been ejected from his post as Superintendent of Indian Affairs a few months before, travelled to London, England, in November 1775, on the eve of the American Revolution, to obtain a promise from the Crown that if the Iroquois fought on the British side, they would obtain a land grant in Canada. During and after the American Revolution, American colonists confiscated land and property from those who were Loyalists during the war. The British government compensated both Indian and non-Indian Loyalists with cash payments for their losses.

By early 1783, Brant had selected the valley of the Grand River as a place of settlement; in 1784 Frederick Haldimand agreed. The land was acquired from the Mississaugas in May 1784, with Lieutenant-Colonel John Butler acting as an agent of purchase on behalf of the government.

Later, the Crown adopted the position that it had failed to obtain title to the entire valley at the time of its purchase from the Mississaugas.

== Interpretation ==
=== Nature of the grant ===
On April 26, 1784, Frederick Haldimand wrote:

"The mode of acquiring lands by what is called Deeds of Gift is to be entirely discontinued, for, by the King's instructions, no Private Person, Society, Corporation or colony is capable of acquiring any property in lands belonging to the Indians, either by purchase, or grant or conveyance from the Indians, excepting only where the lands lie within the limits of any colony the soil of which has been vested in Proprietaries or Corporations by grants from the Crown; in which cases such Proprietaries or Corporations only shall be capable of acquiring such property by purchase or grants from the Indians."

Government officials originally interpreted the grant as prohibiting the Indians from leasing or selling the land to anyone but the government. Joseph Brant countered that Haldimand had promised the Indians freehold land tenure equal to that enjoyed by the colony's Loyalist settlers. As freeholders, the Indians could lease or sell land to the highest bidder. In 1793, Lieutenant Governor John Graves Simcoe stated that the Indians could not lease their land since British subjects could lease land only from British subjects. Brant considered the right to lease or sell land as a litmus test for Indian sovereignty.

The Crown said that the grant was for all members of the Six Nations, but Brant said the land should be only for members of the Six Nations who lived on the land.

=== Extent of the lands ===
Although the overall limits of the lands mentioned in the proclamation were clearly defined, "extending in that proportion to the head of the said river", the Crown contended that the grant was limited by the extent of land they had previously purchased and that they could not grant land which they did not already own. In May 1784, Haldimand had purchased a tract of land from the Mississaugas, which was referred to in the grant as generally "situated between the Lakes Ontario, Erie and Huron". In fact, the head of the Grand River is located some thirty miles beyond the limits of land that the Crown maintained that it had previously purchased from the Mississaugas.

In 1791, at the request of the Six Nations, an initial survey was completed. It was agreed between Joseph Brant, Henry Tekarihoga, and other chiefs with the Nassau District land board that the middle of the grant should not follow the exact windings of the river, but that it should be drawn from an easterly bend near the river's mouth straight to the Mohawk village. Although the government alleges that the Six Nations agreed to the accuracy of the information gathered during the 1791 survey, the resulting documentation in the form of a map signed by the Land Board and the Six Nation chiefs was subsequently "believed lost or destroyed".

The Crown's position was that the extent of the land was as determined in the subsequent Thomas Ridout survey of 1821, drawing a northern boundary near the present location of Elora, Ontario, referred to at the time of the survey as "The Falls". In this survey, the size of the grant was described as 674,910 acres (2,731.3 km^{2}) As early as July 4, 1819, Six Nations chief John Brant (Tekarihoga), son of Joseph Brant, in a speech at a council held near present-day Hamilton, Ontario, to deal with land issues, stated, "We are surprised to find that [the] Government says that we own the Lands to the Falls only as we have the Writings to prove otherwise. We have them here and are ready to produce them."

== See also ==
- Six Nations of the Grand River
- Grand River land dispute, present-day dispute over Haldimand territory
