= John Brant (Mohawk leader) =

Mohawk chief and government official in Canada (1794–1832)

- Ahyonwaeghs
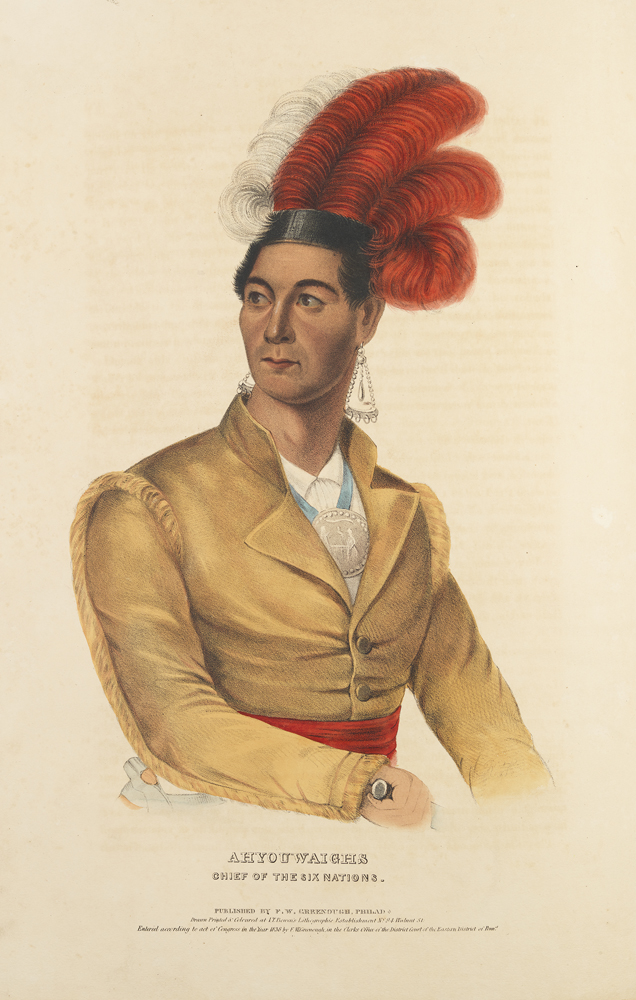

Tekarihó:ken
- In office 1830–1832
- Preceded by: Henry Tekarihoga

Legislator for Haldimand
- In office 1830–1831
- Succeeded by: John Warren

Personal details
- Born: September 27, 1794 Near today's Brantford, Ontario
- Died: August 27, 1832 (aged 37) Near Brantford, Ontario
- Cause of death: Cholera
- Relations: Uncle, Johannes Tekarihoga
- Parent(s): Joseph Brant (Thayendanegea), Catharine Croghan Brant (Adonwentishon)
- Known for: First Indigenous lawmaker in Upper Canada's parliament; fought in Battle of Queenston Heights, encouraged school construction, resident superintendent, Six Nations of the Grand River

John Brant or Ahyonwaeghs (September 27, 1794 – August 27, 1832) was a Mohawk chief and government official in Upper Canada.

== Biography ==
Brant was born near the current site of Brantford, Ontario, the son of Joseph Brant (Thayendanegea) and Catharine Croghan Brant (Adonwentishon). His father Joseph was a Mohawk leader who became famous during the American Revolutionary War. His mother Catharine was from an important Mohawk lineage: while her father was the Irish trader George Croghan, her mother was the sister of Johannes Tekarihoga, one of the hereditary Mohawk civil leaders (royaner or "sachems"). Because the Mohawks were a matrilineal society, the title "Tekarihó:ken" did not pass from father to son. Instead, the women in the family selected the next Tekarihó:ken from their male relatives. As clan mother, Catharine Brant would name Johannes Tekarihoga's successor. At a young age, her son John became an obvious candidate for the next Tekarihó:ken.

The family moved to the Burlington Bay area in 1802. John Brant attended school at Ancaster and Niagara (Niagara-on-the-Lake). In the War of 1812, Brant and John Norton led the Indigenous warriors who helped repel the American attack at the Battle of Queenston Heights in October 1812. He was commissioned a lieutenant in the Indian Department and was involved in several other engagements during the war including the battles of Beaver Dams and Lundy's Lane.

Brant helped his uncle try to get a formal deed for a grant of land along the Grand River in what was called the Haldimand Proclamation to the Six Nations. In 1821, he went to England with his brother-in-law, Robert Johnson Kerr, to lobby the British government after Lieutenant-Governor Sir Peregrine Maitland informed them that the Six Nations had no claim to the northern part of the grant. Despite their efforts, the government of the colony managed to retain control over the sale of native lands in the area.

While in England, Brant wrote to Thomas Campbell whose popular poem "Gertrude of Wyoming" portrayed his father as "Monster Brant" in its description of the Battle of Wyoming. Brant provided evidence that his father had been elsewhere at the time. Campbell issued a public apology in 1822.

Brant encouraged the building of schools for the Iroquois. In 1828, he was appointed resident superintendent for the Six Nations of the Grand River. In 1830, he was elected to the Legislative Assembly of Upper Canada for Haldimand. He was the first Indigenous person to sit in Upper Canada's parliament as a lawmaker. In February 1831, his right to hold the seat was questioned due to voting irregularities, and he was thrown out of office. His opponent John Warren was declared elected.

In about 1830, his mother Catharine named him as the next Tekarihó:ken, succeeding his recently deceased uncle Henry Tekarihoga. Brant held the office for only a short time; he died in 1832 near Brantford, a victim of a cholera pandemic. He was buried beside his father at His Majesty's Royal Chapel of the Mohawks in Brantford.
