= Tekarihogen =

Title for a royaner of the Mohawk nation

- Tekarihó:ken
- Grand Council of the Haudenosaunee
- Type: Royaner
- Member of: Haudenosaunee Confederacy Chiefs Council
- Seat: Onondaga
- Appointer: Mohawk Clan Mothers
- Term length: Life; (can be recalled by Clan Mother)
- Constituting instrument: Great Law of Peace
- First holder: Tekarihó:ken
- Succession: Condolence by Clan Mothers

Tekarihogen or Dekarihokenh (Mohawk: Tekarihó:ken) is the name and office of the first-ranking Haudenosaunee royaner of the Mohawk nation. The title has been rendered in English in numerous spelling variations.

The title of Dekarihokenh is hereditary through the maternal line; each office holder is a male of the Mohawk Turtle clan. He is appointed by the senior women of the clan, as the Haudenosaunee have a matrilineal system of descent and property. Like the other Royaner of the Grand Council of the Six Nations, the Dekarihokenh is part of the ceremonial and traditionally leadership of the Haudenosaunee, but not necessarily part of the political leadership of modern tribal or First Nation governments.

In the council of the Six Nations Confederacy the chief who bore it served as the titular head of the Mohawks, the first in rank of that tribe’s nine sachems. Since the Mohawks headed the roll listing the council’s 49 or 50 chiefs, his name took precedence over all others.

Holders of this title include:

- Johannes Tekarihoga
- Henry Crogan
- John Brant
