= David Hill =

David Hill may refer to:

== Arts and music ==
- David Octavius Hill (1802–1870), Scottish painter and arts activist
- David Hess (1936–2011), American actor, singer, and songwriter, also known as David Hill
- David Hill (author) (born 1942), New Zealand author of fiction
- David Hill (producer) (born 1946), American executive producer of television, mainly with the Fox organization
- David Hill (choral director) (born 1957), British choral conductor and organist
- David Hill (designer) (born 1957), American industrial designer
- David Hill, British former member of the band Ballistic Brothers and founder of Nuphonic record label

== Politics ==
- David Hill (Oregon politician) (1809–1850), American politician, founder of the city of Hillsboro, Oregon
- David B. Hill (1843–1910), American politician, governor of New York, 1885–1891, U.S. senator from New York, 1892–1897
- David Jayne Hill (1850–1932), American academic, diplomat and author, U. S. assistant secretary of state, 1898–1903
- David Hill (Labour adviser) (1948–2024), British political adviser
- David Hill (Canadian politician) (born c. 1978), Canadian politician, Ottawa city councillor
- David Hill (Muscogee politician), Muscogee politician and principal chief
- David Hill (Wyoming politician), member of the Wyoming House of Representatives

== Sports ==
- David Hill (Rangers footballer) (fl. 1881–1882), Scottish footballer (Rangers and Scotland)
- David Hill (footballer, born 1881) (1881–1928), Scottish footballer (Third Lanark and Scotland)
- David Hill (cricketer) (1915–1974), Guyanese cricketer
- David Hill (rugby league) (1946–2025), British rugby league player (Wigan and Great Britain)
- David Hill (tight end) (born 1954), American football player (Detroit Lions)
- David Hill (footballer, born 1965), English footballer for Bradford City
- David Hill (wide receiver) (born 1977), American football player
- David Hill (rugby union) (born 1978), New Zealand rugby union player
- David Hill (parathlete) (born 1989), British Paralympic swimmer and triathlete

== Other people ==
- David Hill (Mohawk) (1745–1790), Mohawk chief
- David Hill (missionary) (1840–1896), British Wesleyan Methodist missionary to China
- David Haworth Hill (1851–1926), British-born Australian civil servant and philatelist
- David Keynes Hill (1915–2002), British physiologist
- Tex Hill (David Lee Hill, 1915–2007), American fighter pilot and flying ace
- David L. Hill (1919–2008), American nuclear physicist
- David Hill (businessman) (born 1946), Australian businessman
- David Hill, Australian deputy chancellor of the University of Adelaide, 2020–2022
- David Mark Hill (1960–2008), American spree killer

== See also ==
- Colonel Guy Johnson and Karonghyontye (Captain David Hill), a 1776 portrait by Benjamin West
- David Hill Memorial School, a school for blind girls in Hankou, China (1883–1911)
- David Octavius Hill Medal, a prize in photography established in 1955
- Dave Hill (disambiguation)
- Joe D'Amato (1936–1999), Italian film director who used the pseudonym David Hills
- David Hille (born 1981), Australian rules footballer
