= Ann Claus =

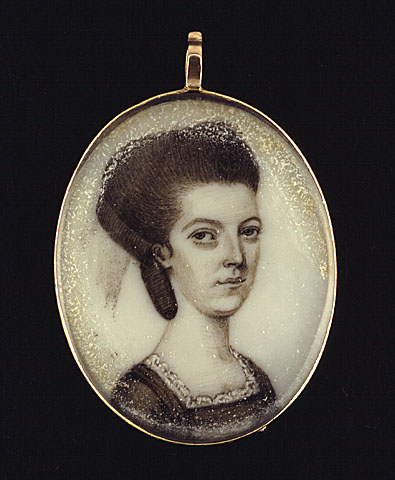
- Born: Ann Weisenberg; May 26, 1745; Mount Johnson, New York
- Died: February 5, 1801 (aged 55); Niagara-on-the-Lake, Upper Canada
- Spouse: Daniel Claus (m. 1762; died 1787)
- Children: William Claus

Ann Claus (1745–1801) was the daughter of Sir William Johnson and Catherine Weisenberg. Like her father, she played an important part in the early British Indian Department. She was the wife of Deputy Agent Daniel Claus, the mother of Deputy Superintendent General William Claus, and an influential figure among the Six Nations.

== Family ==
As her parents were not married, Ann was baptized with her mother's name of Weisenberg. In 1762, she married Daniel Claus, a Deputy Agent in the British Indian Department. They had one son, William Claus, who would serve as the head of the Indian Department in Upper Canada from 1799 to 1826. After the outbreak of the American Revolutionary War in 1775, the Claus and Johnson families lost their substantial land holdings in New York and were forced to relocate to Canada as Loyalists.

== Influence and legacy ==
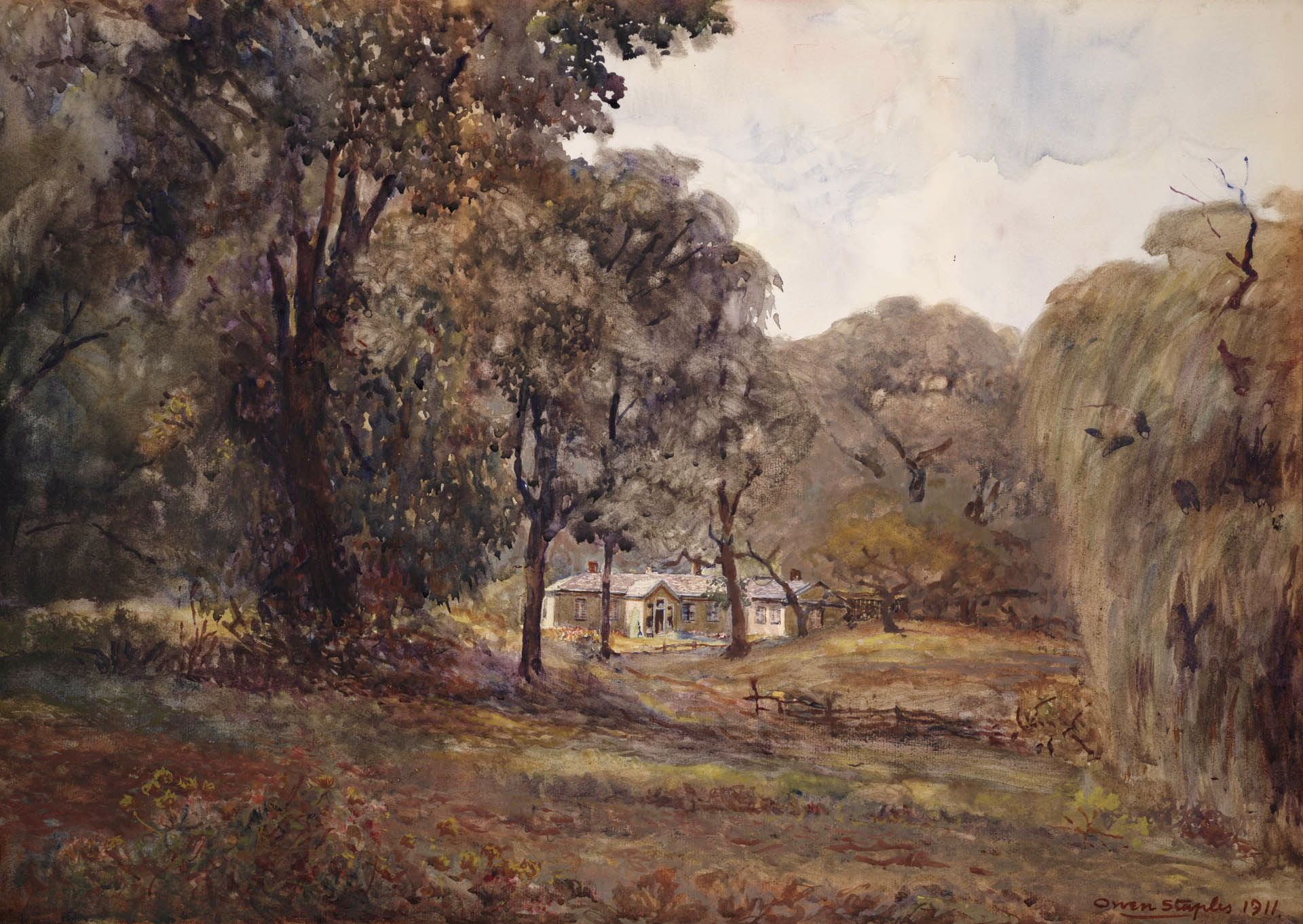
The Wilderness (1911), by Owen Staples

Like other members of the Johnson family, Ann Claus had a close relationship with the Six Nations, particularly the Mohawk among whom she grew up. As a mark of respect for the services of her husband and father, the Six Nations of the Grand River gifted her a plot of land in Newark on December 31, 1799. It was on this land that the Claus family built their estate, known as the Wilderness, which still stands in Niagara-on-the-Lake today. After her death, Ann Claus was mourned at a condolence ceremony by the Six Nations. Joseph Brant gave her the honorific title "elder Sister of the Six Nations, and Daughter to our old Friend Wanighjage".

Ann Claus played an important part in eighteenth-century Indian Affairs. Not only did her marriage link two important Indian Department families, Ann Claus occupied a similar diplomatic position as other prominent contemporary women, such as Molly Brant and Catharine Croghan, as a link between Indigenous and British society on the early American frontier.
