= Hankou =

Former Chinese town, now a part of Wuhan, Hubei Province

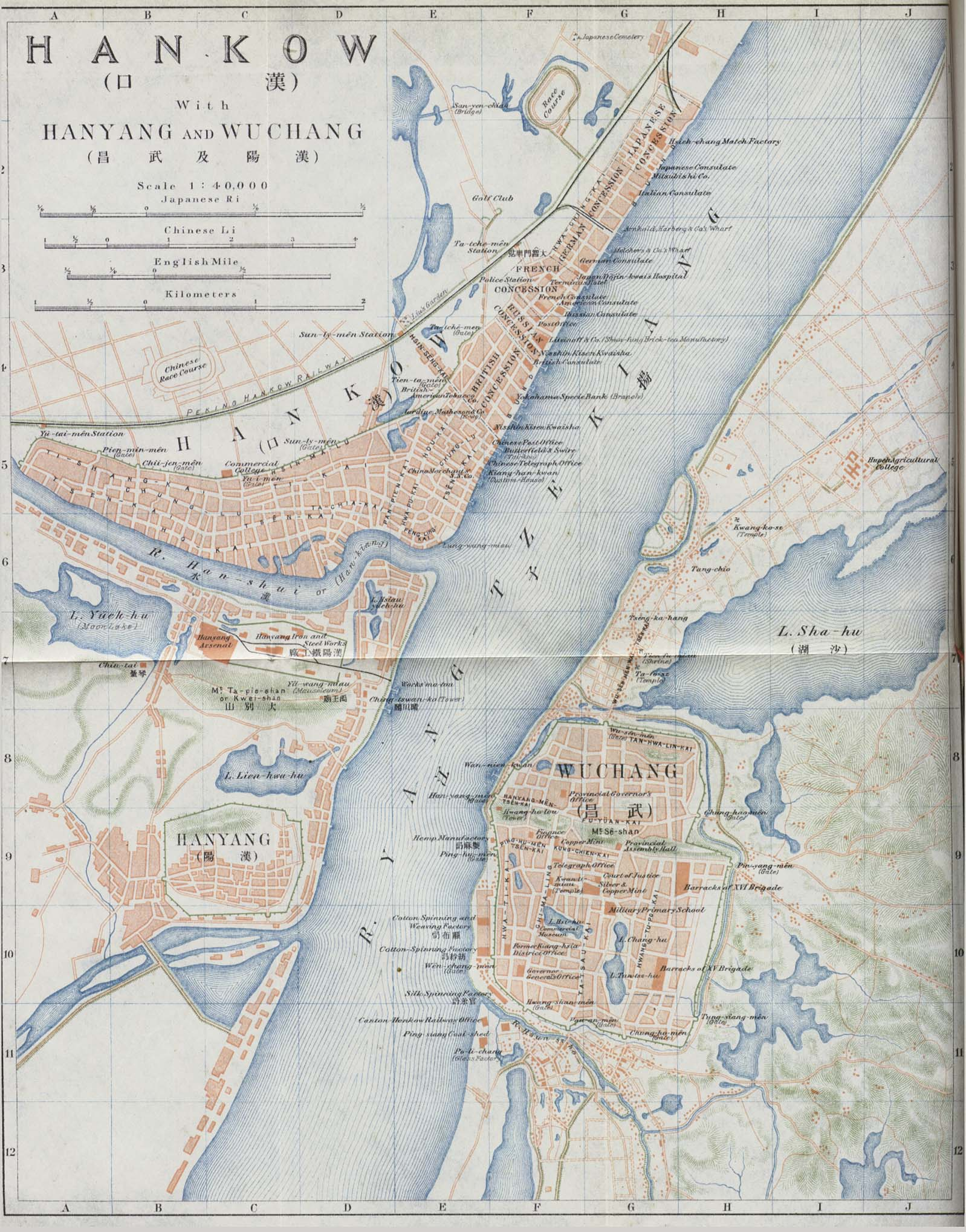
The map of Hankou (top left, with the five foreign concessions), Hanyang, and Wuchang, as of 1915

Hankou, alternately romanized as Hankow (simplified Chinese: 汉口; traditional Chinese: 漢口; pinyin: Hànkǒu), was one of the three towns (the other two were Wuchang and Hanyang) merged to become modern-day Wuhan city, the capital of the Hubei province, China. It stands north of the Han and Yangtze Rivers where the Han flows into the Yangtze. Hankou is connected by bridges to its triplet sister towns Hanyang (between Han and Yangtze) and Wuchang (on the southern side of the Yangtze).

Hankou is the main port of Hubei Province and the single largest port in the middle reaches of Yangtze.

== History ==
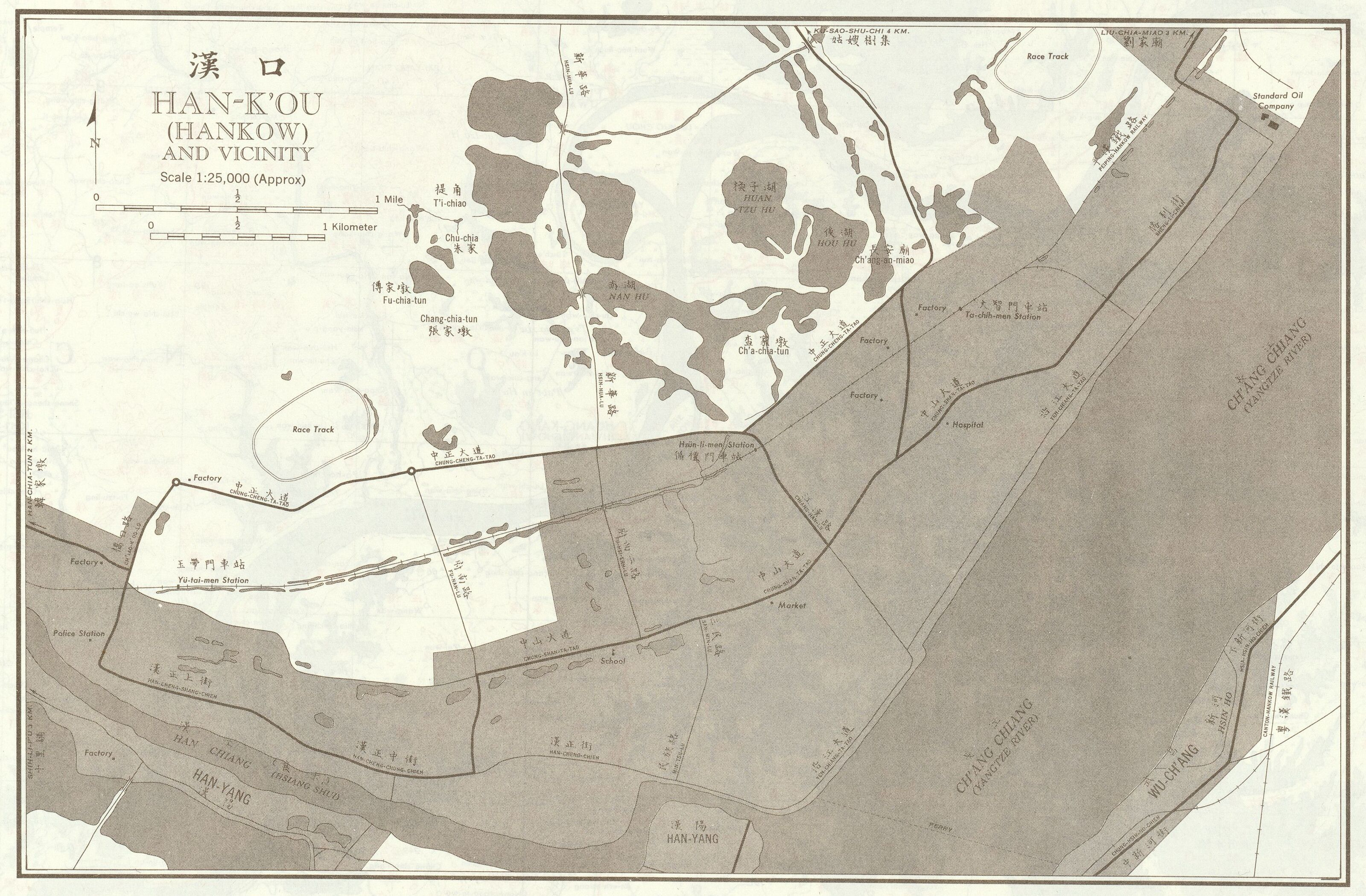
Map of Hankou (labeled as HAN-K'OU (HANKOW) 漢口)

The city's name literally means "Mouth of the Han", from its position at the confluence of the Han with the Yangtze River. The name appears in a Tang dynasty poem by Liu Zhangqing. Other historical names for the city include Xiakou (夏口), Miankou (沔口), and Lukou (魯口).

Hankou, from the Ming to late Qing, was under the administration of the local government in Hanyang, although it was already one of the four major national markets (zh:四大名镇) in Ming dynasty. It was not until 1899 that Zhang Zhidong decided to separate Hankou from Hanyang. Hankou was then divided into four districts, which are Juren, Youyi, Xunli, and Dazhi (居仁、由義、循禮、大智). Some of the names can still be found in modern-day Wuhan, where there are geographical names such as Xunlimen, Jurenmen, and Dazhimen. By 1900, this boom town on the Yangtze was referred to as "the Chicago of China" by the media back then.

In 1926, Hankou was officially established as a city, where its municipal government was built in Jianghan district. In the same year, the Northern Expedition reached Hankou, and merged Hankou with adjacent Wuchang and Hanyang to make it the seat of the national capital, Wuhan. But in 1927, when Nanjing succeeded in the fight to be the national capital, Wuhan was returned to its original form, with Hankou being again a city by itself. This time Hankou was established as a "Special Municipality," which resembles a direct-controlled municipality in present day. Before 1949, Hankou has shifted between being a special municipality and a provincial city. In 1949, Hankou was finally merged with Hanyang and Wuchang to become Wuhan, when the communists arrived in Hankou on May 16.

=== Revolutionary periods ===
Hankou was the destination on the escape route of groups of missionaries fleeing the Boxers in the Northern provinces around 1900. The flight of some missionaries from the T'ai-yüan massacre in Shan-si is recorded in the work A Thousand Miles of Miracle in China, by Reverend A E Glover, one of the fleeing missionaries.

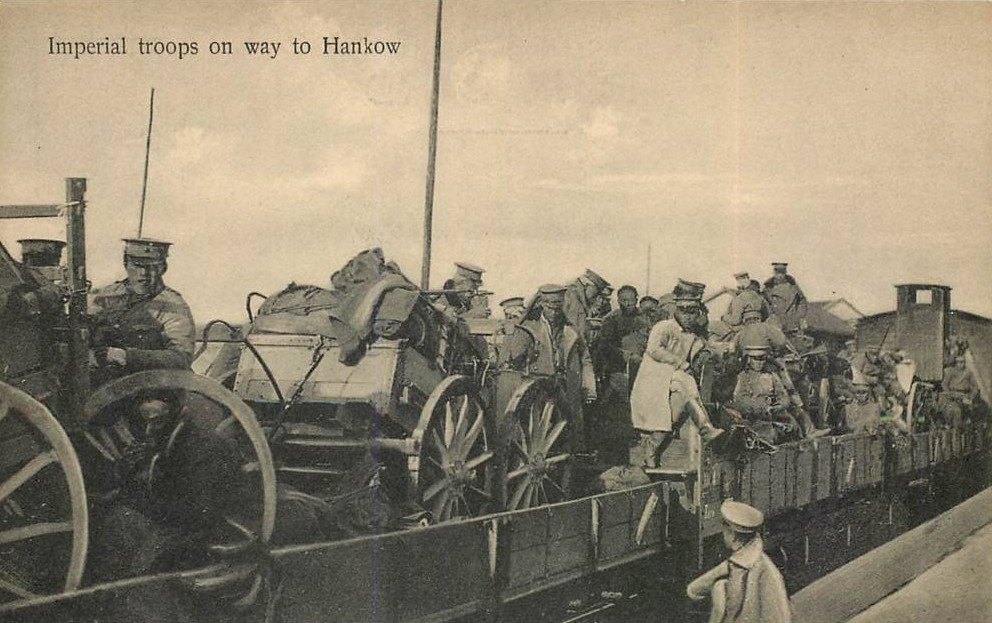
Troops sent to recapture Hankou

Bombardment of Hankow (1911)

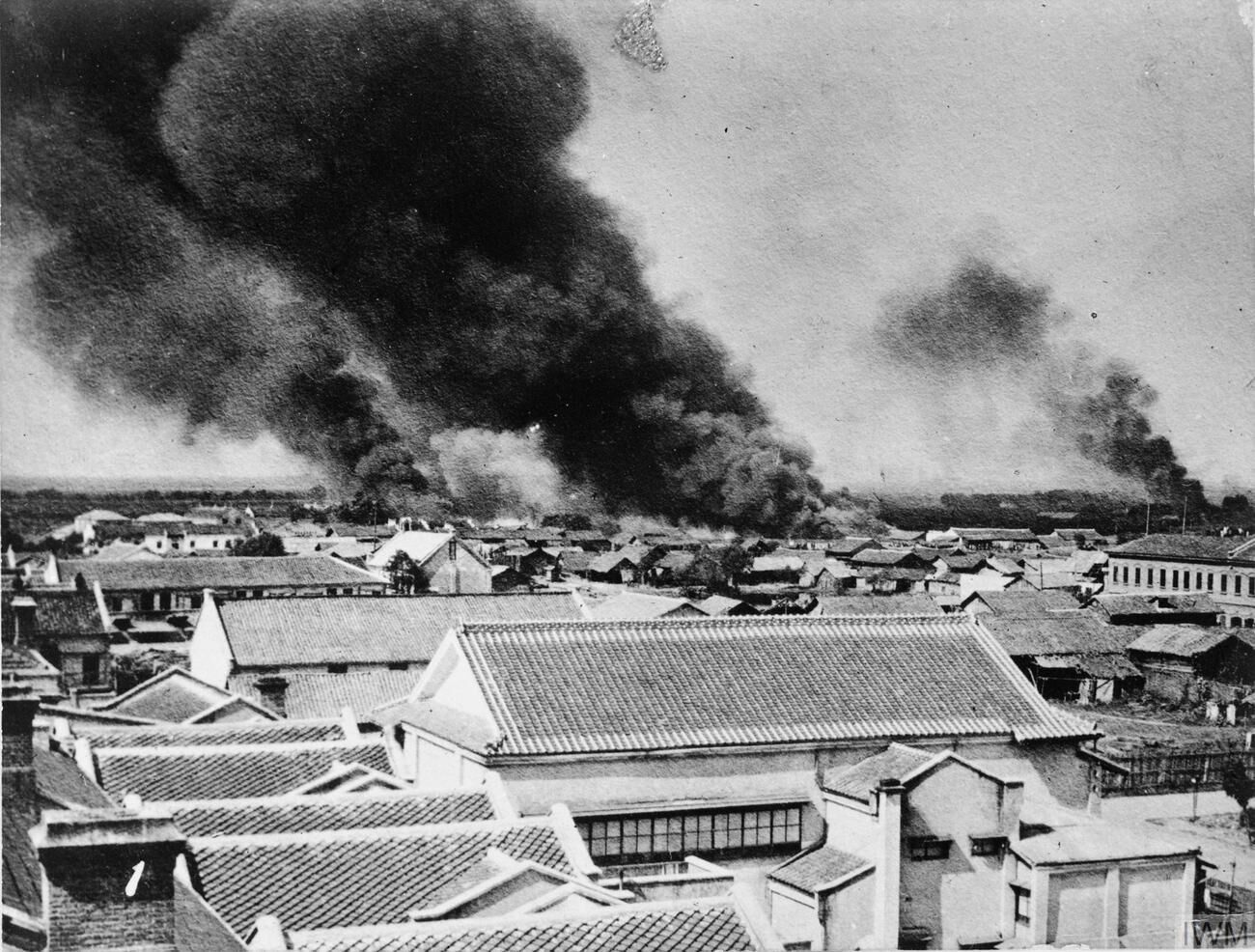
Hankow city in flames after the Republican defeat.

On 10 October 1911, a revolution to establish the Republic of China and replace the Qing dynasty led to the involvement of Hankou in the struggle between Hubei revolutionary forces and the Qing army, led by Yuan Shikai. Although the revolution began in Wuchang with a revolt started by members of the New Army, revolutionaries quickly captured major strategic cities and towns throughout the province, including Hankou on October 12. The Qing dynasty army recaptured Hankou later, but as the revolution spread throughout China, eventually the town and the province came under control of the Republic of China.

=== Foreign concessions period ===
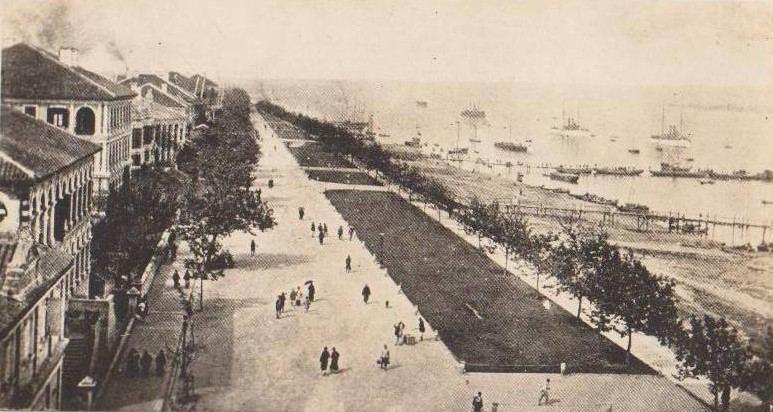
Foreign concessions along the Bund, circa 1900

Hankou used to have five foreign concessions belonging to the United Kingdom (115 acres (47 ha), est. 1862), France (60 acres (24 ha), est. 1886), Russia (60 acres (24 ha), est. 1886), Germany (100 acres (40 ha), est. 1895) and Japan (32 acres (13 ha), est. 1898). The German and Russian concessions ended in 1917 and 1920 respectively and those areas were administered by the Chinese government as the First and the Second Special Area.

In 1862, Russian tea merchants arrived in the British concession of Hankou. Russians in Hankou established four factories using assembly lines and machinery to produce brick tea, and became the city's richest industrialists in what would become the Russian concession.

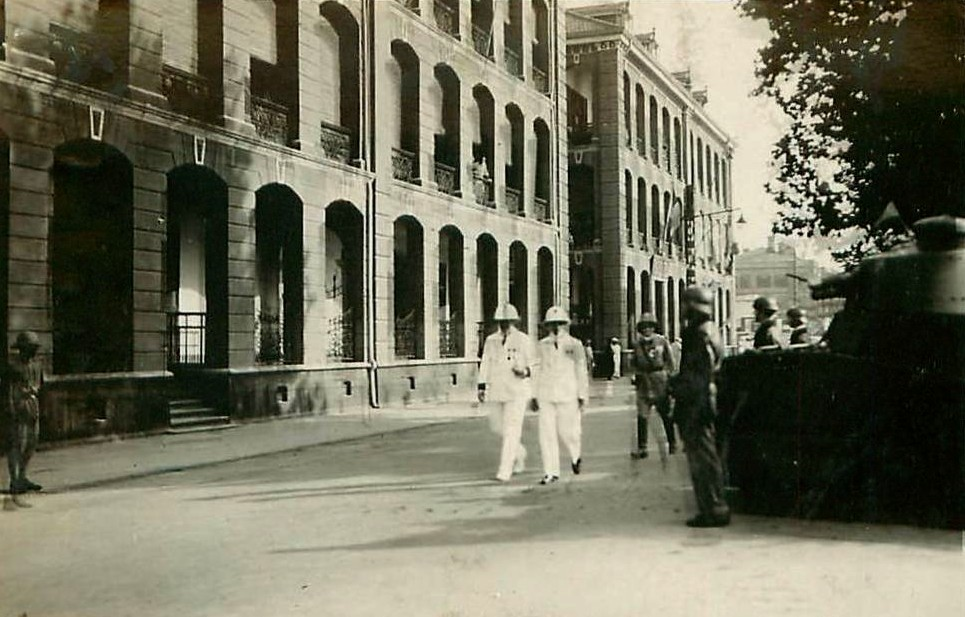
Bastille Day celebrations in the French concession, 1932

Early in 1927, the British concession was occupied in the course of the revolutionary troubles that accompanied the Northern Expedition when the Chinese Kuomintang forces occupied the concession and showed no intention of withdrawing. The Chen-O'Malley Agreement of February 1927 provided for a combined British-Chinese administration of the concession and in 1929 the British concession formally came to an end. From then on it was administered by the Chinese authorities as the Third Special Area.

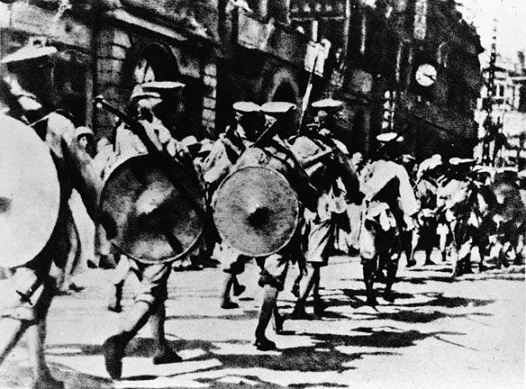
Chinese Kuomintang soldiers marching into the British concession during the Northern Expedition

In the 1920s and 30s, Hankou was one of the Yangtze River ports patrolled by the US Navy to maintain US interests in the area (Yangtze Patrol).

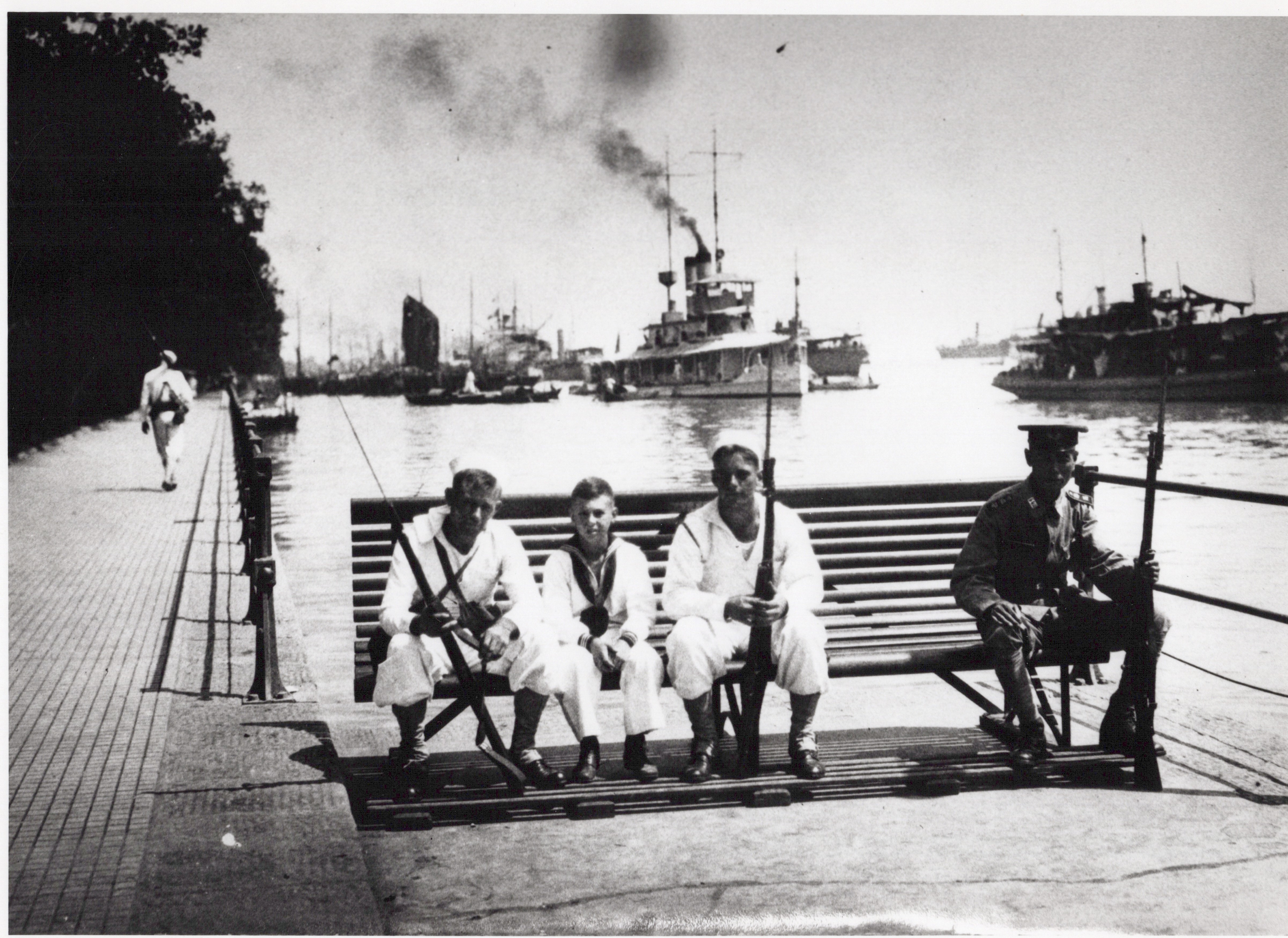
1926, Hankow, American sailors from the USS Palos (docked behind)

Hankou was flooded in the 1931 China floods.

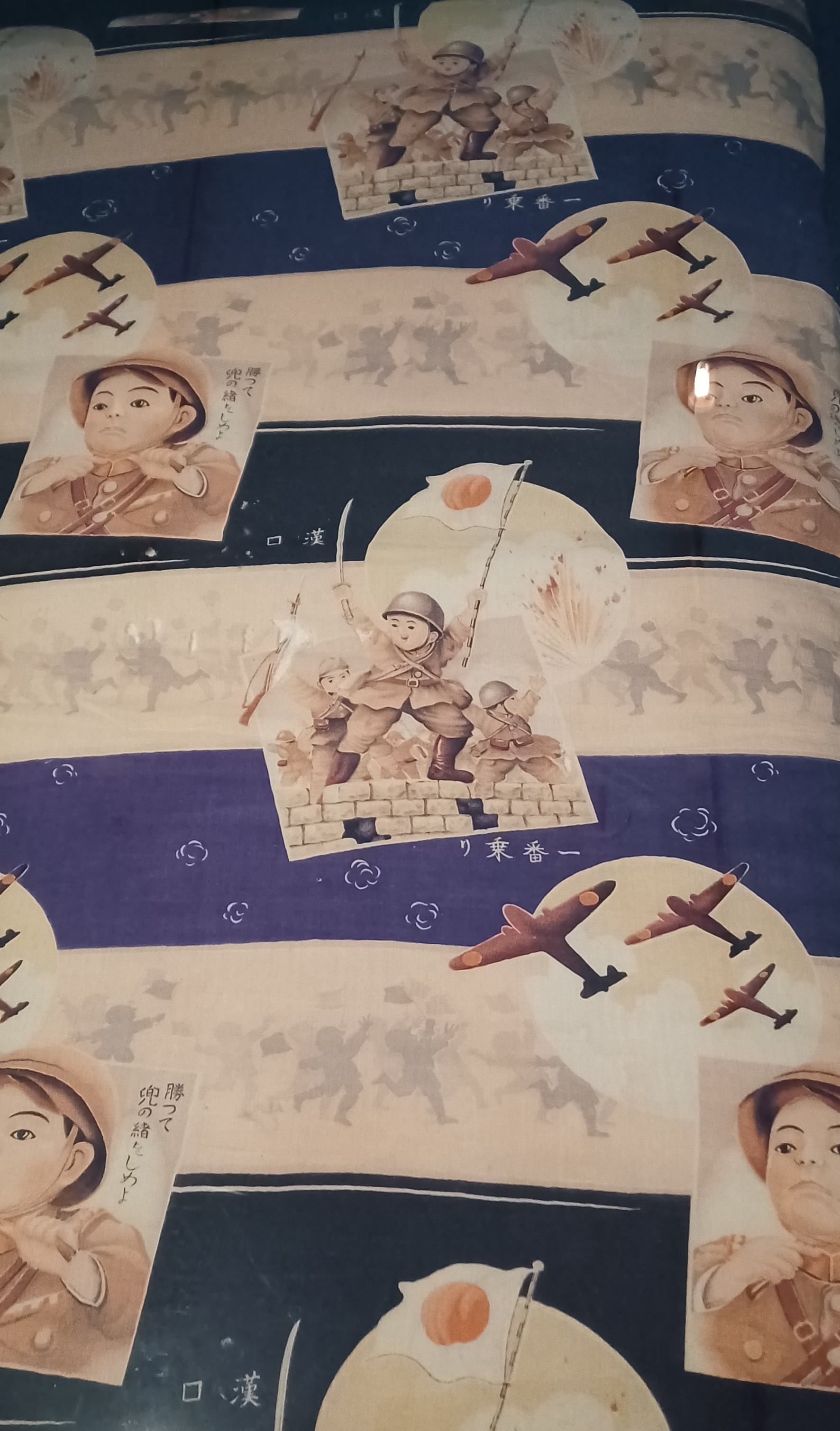
Japanese child's blanket 1938 includes name Hankow. Museum of Far Eastern Antiquities, Stockholm. The culture of war.

Hankou was captured by the Japanese invaders in 1938 (Battle of Wuhan).

An important logistical center, the city was heavily bombed in December 1944 by the US aircraft based in the Chengdu area (part of Operation Matterhorn).

On 19 August 1945, a group of enraged Chinese civilians and soldiers massacred 26 Japanese soldiers in the Hankou reprisal massacre.

The government of Vichy France relinquished the French concession in 1943, and the restored French Republic relinquished it formally in 1946.

The Japanese concession came to an end with the surrender of Japan in 1945.

Before the Communist Revolution, Hankou was the seat of the Roman Catholic Archdiocese of Hankou, covering the province of Hubei. The dioceses in Wuchang, Hanyang and elsewhere in the province were subordinated to it.

In the 1930s, the airports served in Hankow were Wuhan Wangjiadun Airport and Wuhan Nanhu. Wangjiadun served as a civil and military base until 2007 while Nanhu, on the other hand, shut down while Tianhe Airport opened in 1995.

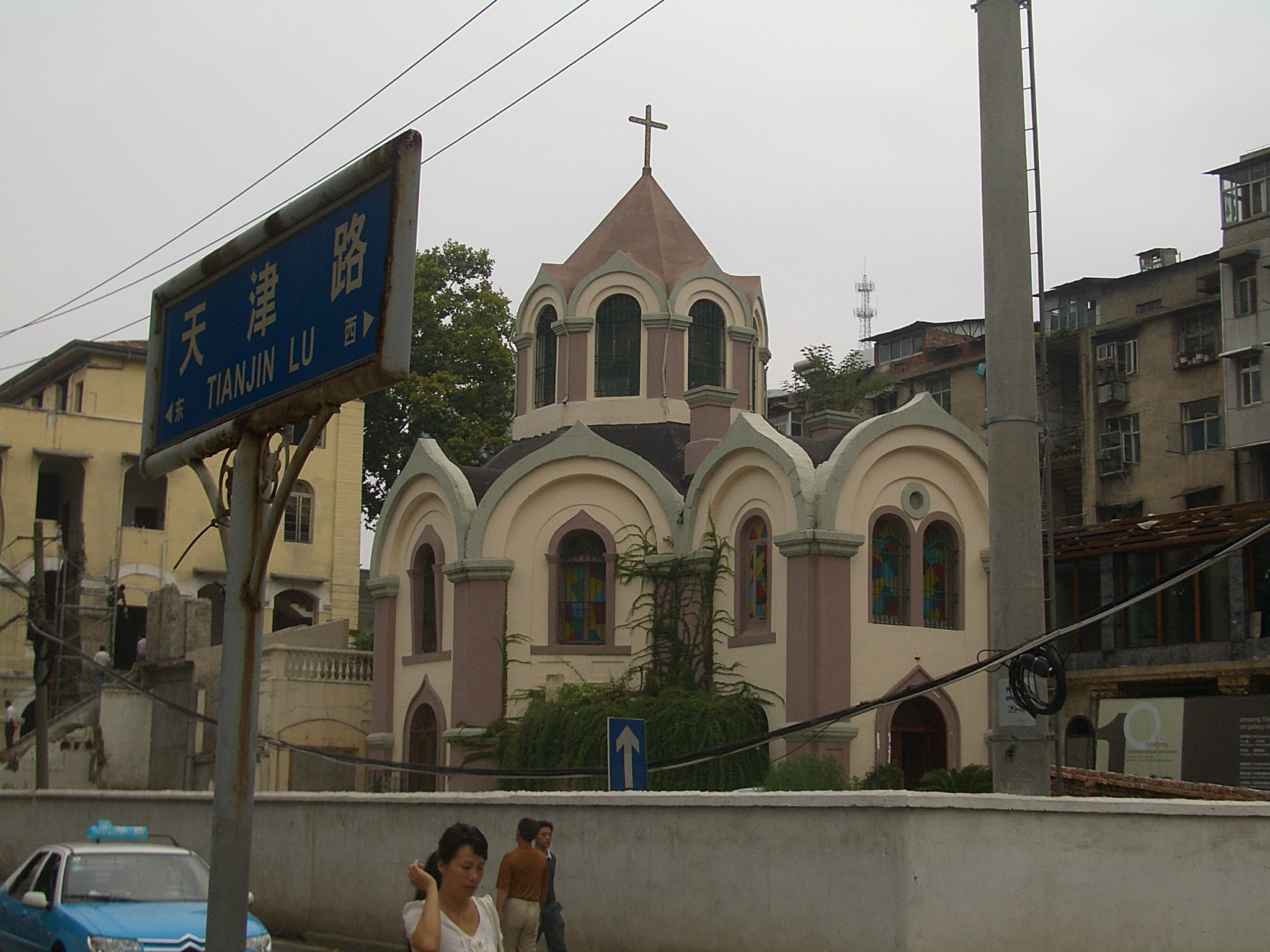
Former Hankou Orthodox Church

There were 150 Korean comfort women and 130 Japanese comfort women at Jiqingli in Hankou during the war.

== Modern status ==
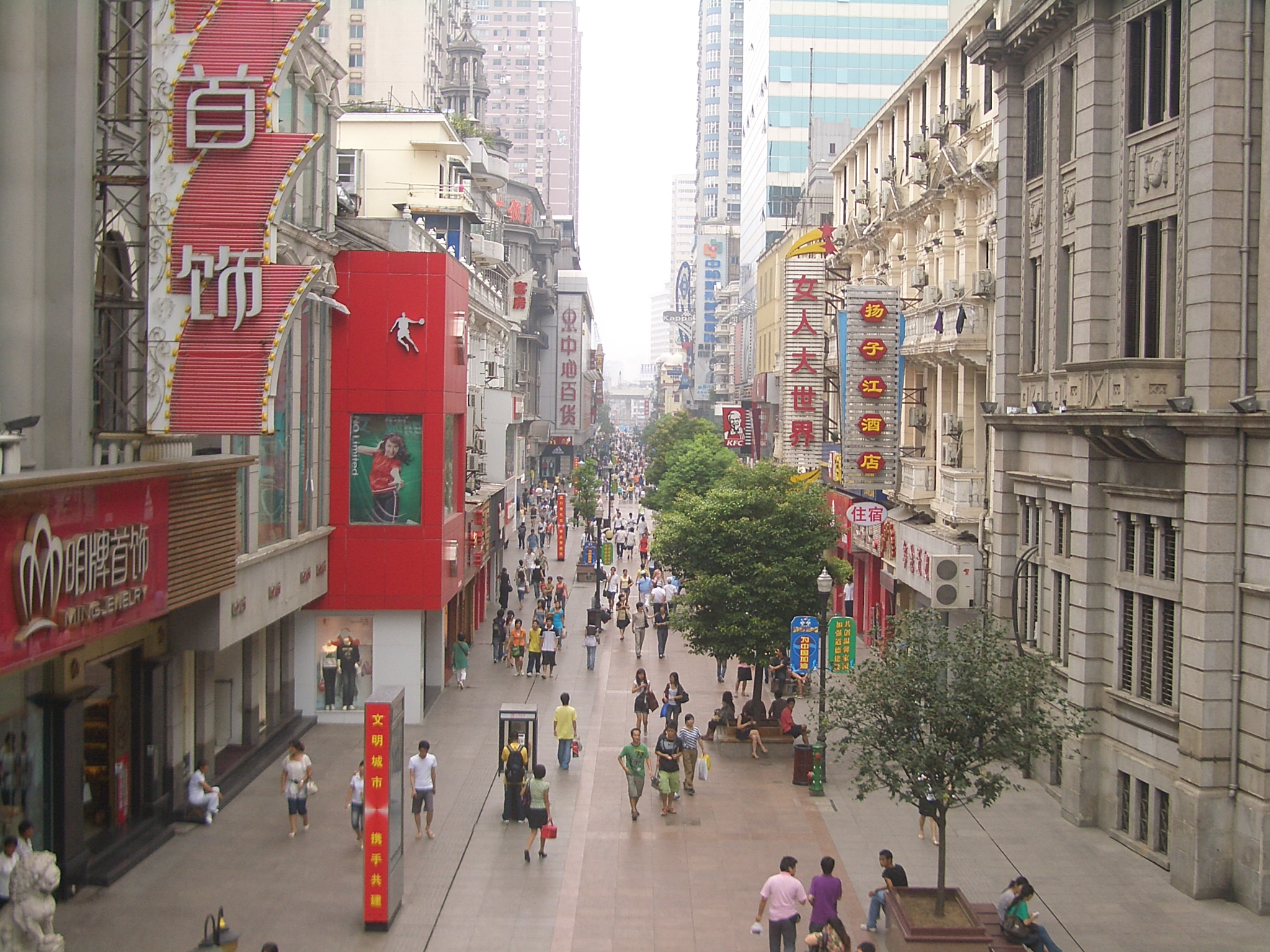
Jianghan Road in central Hankou

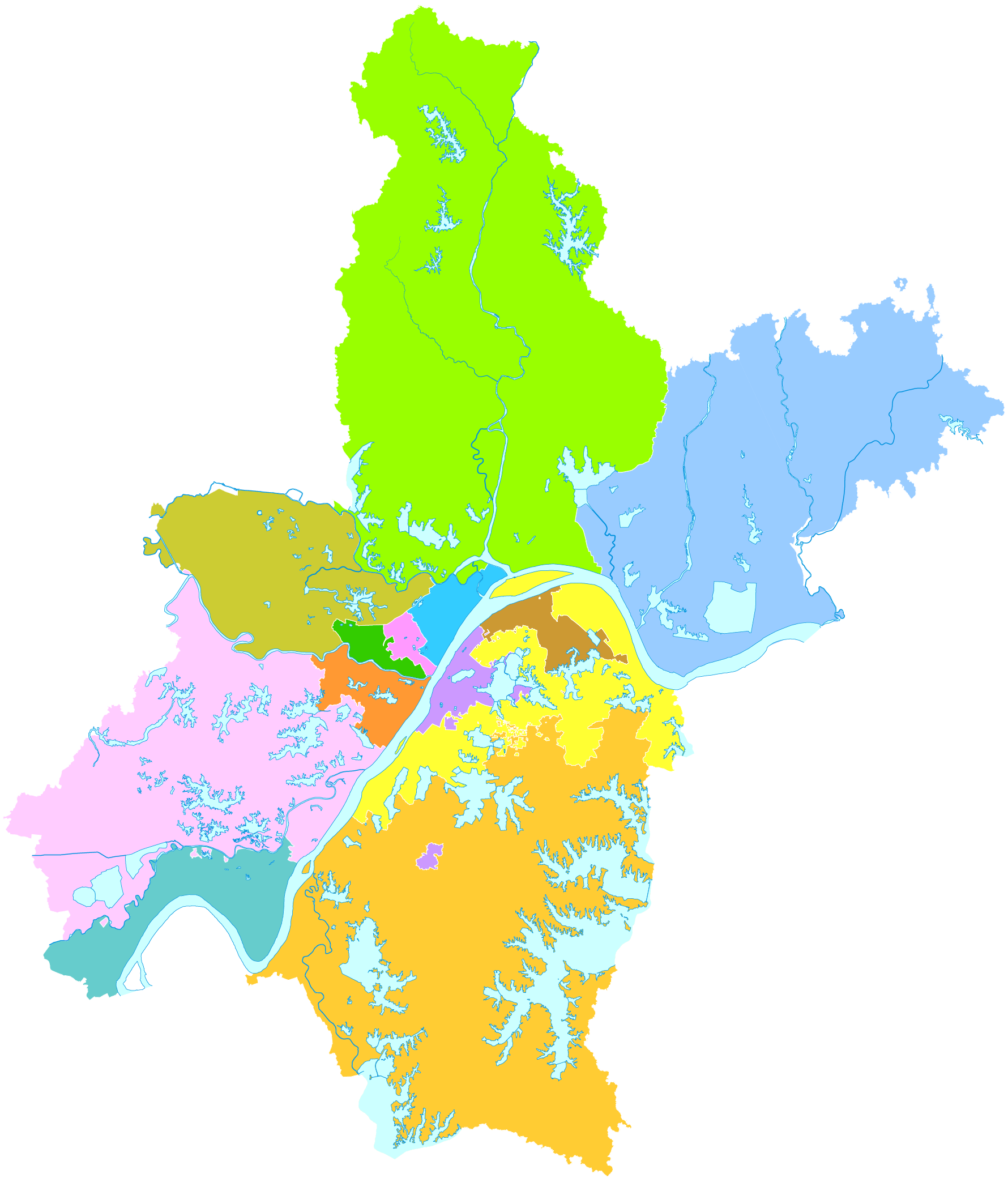
Modern Jiang'an District, Jianghan District, and Qiaokou District are in blue, pink, and green

"Hankou" remains a commonly used name for the part of Wuhan urban area north of the Yangtze and Han Rivers. The name was long preserved in the name of the old Hankou Railway Station (also known as Dazhimen Station), the original terminal of the Jinghan Railway. After the old Dazhimen station closed in 1991, the Hankou name was transferred to the new Hankou Railway Station, which opened in 1991 at a new location, farther away from central city. Railway passengers traveling to Wuhan need to purchase tickets to a particular station: the Hankou Railway Station, the Wuchang Railway Station (near central Wuchang, on the right bank of the Yangtze), or the new Wuhan Railway Station (which opened in 2009, also on the right bank, but a long distance from the historical Wuchang).

Nonetheless, Hankou is no longer the name of an administrative unit (e.g., a district), because its area now falls mostly within Jiang'an District, Jianghan District, and Qiaokou District. That contrasts with Wuchang and Hanyang, the names of which have been retained in the eponymous administrative districts within the City of Wuhan.

== Media ==
Hankou once had an English-language newspaper, The Hankow Daily News, which was published by a German individual.

== Education ==
- David Hill memorial school (1883)
