= John Deseronto =

Mohawk war chief

Captain John Deserontyon (Mohawk: Odeserundiye, alt. Captain John, Deseronto), U.E.L (c. 1740s – 1811) was a Mohawk war chief allied with the British during the American Revolutionary War. He led his people to Upper Canada after the war, settling on land granted by the Crown at the Bay of Quinte in present-day Ontario. This reserve, initially settled primarily by Mohawk loyalists from the Lower Castle, is known as Tyendinaga Mohawk Territory, Ontario. Deseronto, Ontario is named for him.

== Early life ==
John Deseronto (alt. Deserontyon, Odeserundiye in Mohawk, meaning "The Lightning has Struck") was born in the 1740s, most likely in the Mohawk Valley. Educated in a colonial school, he had become acculturated to white customs. In 1759, during the French and Indian War, the North American front of the Seven Years' War between Britain and France, he took part allied with the British in the Battle of Fort Niagara, and the following year he was at the Battle of Quebec, and participated in the capture of Montreal with Amherst. In the summer of 1764, he accompanied John Bradstreet in the attack on Fort Detroit at the end of Pontiac's Rebellion.

== American Revolution ==
When the American Revolution started, Deseronto was a chief of the Mohawk, living at Fort Hunter where he owned a handsome house and 82 acres (330,000 m^{2}) of rich flat land. He had a wagon, plough, harrow, and ten beaver traps. This area was known as the Lower Castle. During this war he sided with the British and the loyalist Johnson family. He accompanied Guy Johnson when he left for Canada in the summer of 1775. Deseronto went back to the Mohawk valley the following year and met with Sir John Johnson. In May 1776, he again met with Sir John Johnson and helped him escape to Montreal.

In July 1777, Deseronto was the leader of a Mohawk party that assessed the defences of Fort Stanwix. On 14 July, they surprised and attacked Ensign John Spoor's work detail as it was outside the fort cutting sod. Deseronto passed the information that the fort was strongly garrisoned back to Daniel Claus. Barry St. Leger decided to proceed without adequate artillery. Deseronto took part the Battle of Oriskany and the siege of the fort. After St. Leger had retreated, Deseronto stayed behind to enjoy a meal at the British commander's table. A scouting party from the fort found Deseronto in St. Leger's tent and shot him with buck and ball in the left arm and breast. Deseronto was seriously wounded and almost lost his arm.

He continued to Fort Hunter, where he set about preparing the village for a mass departure. On 4 September, he arrived at General John Burgoyne's camp with the Fort Hunter families and several prominent loyalists, totaling about 150 persons. The villagers had abandoned their homes after hearing about the sacking of the Mohawk Upper Castle by rebel patriots. Deseronto's party had to fight through a 40-man scouting party, consisting of soldiers from the New Hampshire Continental regiments, to reach Burgoyne's camp. They reported killing seven of the Americans, brought in four scalps, and Deseronto was freshly wounded. The American rolls showed five killed and three missing for several days as confirmed by their being accounted for on later rolls. The Fort Hunter Mohawks settled at La Chine, near Montreal, and were supplied by the British in exchange for the war service.

In 1779 Deseronto led two scouting parties up the Richelieu Valley. In 1780, he took part in Sir John Johnson's raid on the Mohawk valley and he was at the Battle of Klock's Field. In 1781 he led multiple raids into the Mohawk valley destroying mills and cattle and taking prisoners. In the spring of 1782, Deseronto and Captain Isaac Hill destroyed the mill at Little Falls on the Mohawk and took some prisoners.

== Post-war years ==
After the war, Deseronto and Joseph Brant, a major war leader of the Upper Castle, met with Governor Frederick Haldimand of Canada to discuss the loss of their land in New York. Haldimand promised to resettle the Mohawk near the Bay of Quinte, on the north east shore of Lake Ontario (in present-day Ontario, Canada). Brant decided that he preferred to settle on the Grand River. Brant and Johnson ridiculed Deseronto's decision to stay at the Bay of Quinte. Haldimand purchased and granted the Mohawks a tract 12 by 13 miles (21 km) on the Bay of Quinte. About 200 Mohawk, primarily from the Lower Castle, settled with Deseronto at what is now called the Tyendinaga Mohawk Territory, Ontario. Deseronto was personally granted a lump sum payment of about £800 for his losses, 3,000 acres (12 km^{2}) of land, and an annual pension of £45.

The Canadian government acceded to Joseph Brant's desire and arranged for the Mohawk of the Upper Castle to settle at the Grand River, at what became known as the Six Nations Reserve.

In 1797, Deseronto and Joseph Brant went to New York to meet with state leaders. In exchange for a small sum, they agreed to extinguish Mohawk land claims within New York. This treaty was never ratified by Congress, and later land claims by Native American nations were based on the state's lack of constitutional authority to conduct such land negotiations and agreements with Native Americans. It was reserved to the federal government.

Deseronto died 7 January 1811 at the Mohawk settlement on the Bay of Quinte in Upper Canada.

== Legacy ==
- The town of Deseronto, Ontario is named in his honour. It was developed after his grandson John Culbertson inherited Deseronto's personal land grant. He received title from the government and started to sell off village tracts to encourage development. In 1995, the townsite was part of what was called the Culbertson Tract land claim, which the government agreed to negotiate in 2003. In 2013, the case was still unresolved.
