= William Claus =

Canadian public official

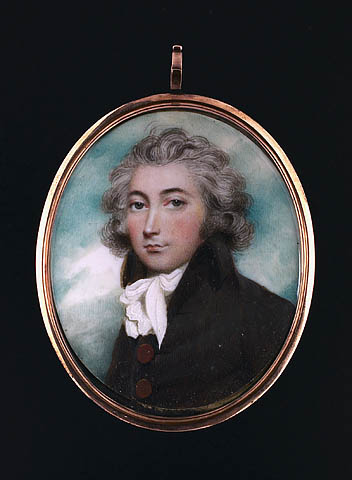

Deputy Superintendent General of Indian Affairs
- In office March 5, 1799 – November 11, 1826
- Preceded by: Alexander McKee
- Succeeded by: Henry Charles Darling

Personal details
- Born: 8 September 1765 Amsterdam, New York
- Died: 4 November 1826 (aged 61) Niagara, Canada
- Spouse: Catherine Jordan (m. 1791)
- Parent(s): Daniel Claus; Ann Weissenberg
- Relatives: Sir William Johnson (grandfather); Sir John Johnson (uncle)

Military service
- Allegiance: Great Britain
- Branch/service: 1st Lincoln Militia
- Rank: Colonel
- Battles/wars: War of 1812

William Claus (1765–1826) was a member of the Executive Council of Upper Canada, a colonel of the Canadian militia during the War of 1812, and the head of the Indian Department in Upper Canada from 1799 until his death.

== Family background ==
William Claus's father, Daniel Claus, was born in Bönnigheim, Holy Roman Empire in 1727 and came to British America in 1749. With the outbreak of the Seven Years' War, Daniel Claus was appointed to the newly created Indian Department by Sir William Johnson in 1755. In 1762, Daniel Claus strengthened his connection to the powerful Johnson family by marrying Sir William's daughter, Ann Weisenberg. Their son, William Claus, was born three years later.

In 1782, William Claus's maternal uncle Sir John Johnson became the head of the Indian Department, and it was largely through Sir John's influence that Claus later secured his own appointment. His descent from Sir William Johnson also meant that Claus had blood ties to the extended Brant family through the children of Molly Brant, with whom he shared a grandfather.

== Career ==
Claus was appointed superintendent of the Indian Department at the post of Niagara following the death of John Butler in 1796. Three years later, the death of Alexander McKee led to Claus's promotion to Deputy Superintendent General, the second highest position in the administration of Indian Affairs in the Canadas. His only superior in the Department was his uncle, Sir John Johnson, whose responsibilities were primarily limited to Lower Canada. As the head of the Indian Department in Upper Canada, Claus was responsible for organizing land surrender treaties, distributing annual presents to the British Empire's Indigenous allies, securing the military assistance of First Nations warriors in times of crisis, and more generally ensuring good relations between the British and the Indigenous nations of the Great Lakes region.

William Claus served during the War of 1812 both as head of the Indian Department in Upper Canada and as the colonel of the 1st Lincoln Militia. During the war, Claus's leadership of the Indian Department was challenged by Joseph Brant's adopted heir John Norton, who accused Claus of cowardice and incompetence. By the end of the war, however, Norton's brashness had alienated many among the Six Nations and the British administration, including the Governor General, Sir Gordon Drummond. Claus accordingly remained the head of the Indian Department in Upper Canada, while Norton was forced into retirement, albeit with a substantial pension.

As one of the leading men of the Niagara region, Claus had served as a justice of the peace since 1803. He was appointed to the Legislative Council of Upper Canada in 1812, and six years later Claus was appointed to the Executive Council, the most important body advising the Lieutenant Governor on the governance of the Upper Canada.

== Death and legacy ==
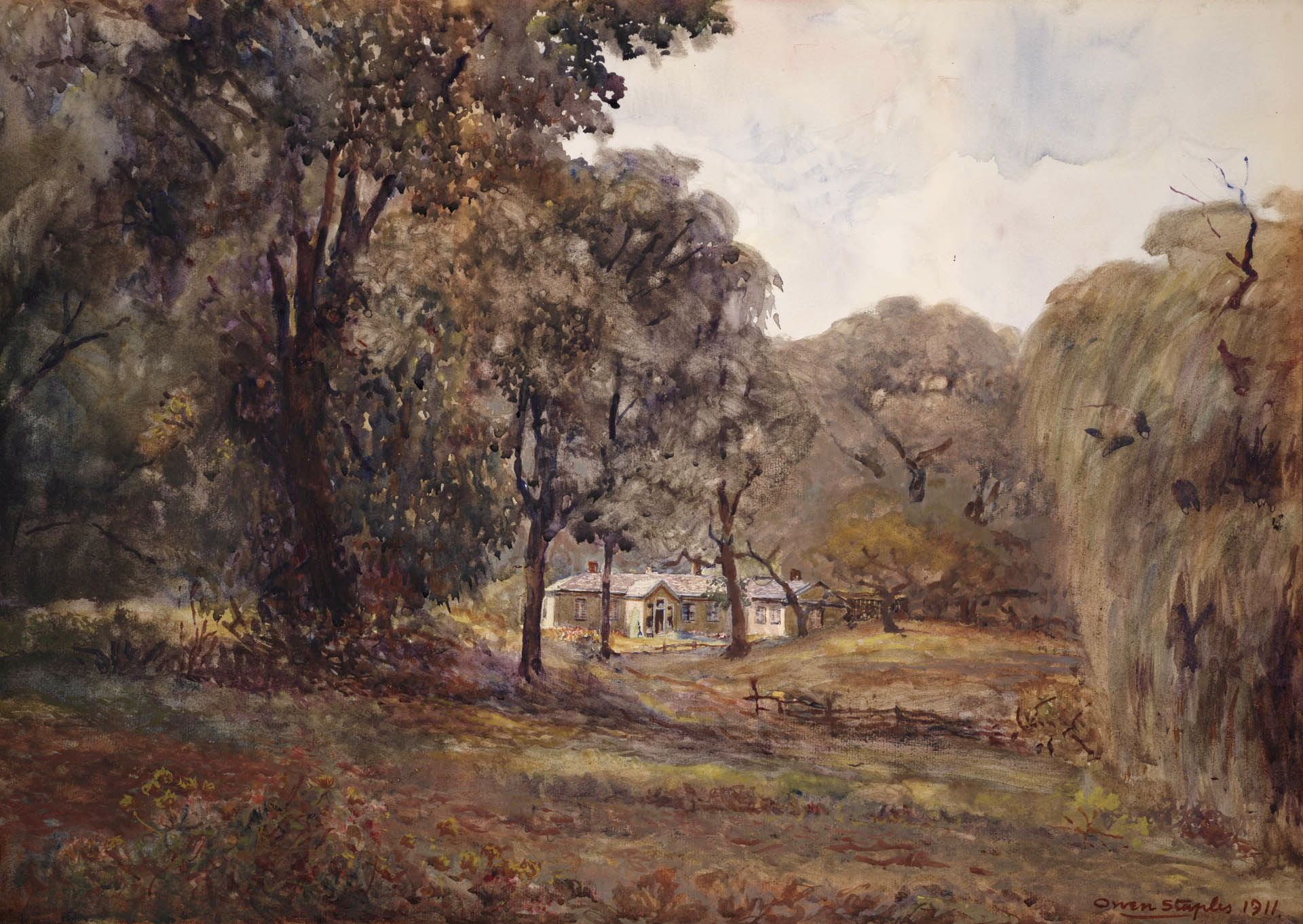
Claus's estate, the Wilderness, in 1911

Claus rarely enjoyed good health in his later years, and was a long-time sufferer of gout. He died of cancer in 1826 at the age of 61. Following his death, William Claus's heirs were involved in a substantial dispute with the Six Nations of the Grand River due to Claus's failure to pay the interest that had been generated from their trust fund, of which Claus had been the principle trustee.

In 1791, William Claus married Catherine Jordan. Together they had three sons and two daughters who survived to adulthood. One of William Claus's sons, Daniel Claus, was killed at the Battle of Crysler's Farm in 1813. A second son, Warren Claus, became a leading lawyer in Upper Canada.

The Claus family home, named the Wilderness, was purchased by the Six Nations and given to Ann Claus, William Claus's mother, as a mark of respect for the longstanding connections between the communities on the Grand River and the Johnson and Claus families. It was destroyed by American troops in December 1813 as part of the burning of Newark during the U.S. retreat from the Niagara Peninsula. Rebuilt in 1816-1817, the home can still be seen in Niagara-on-the-Lake today.

== Family Gallery ==
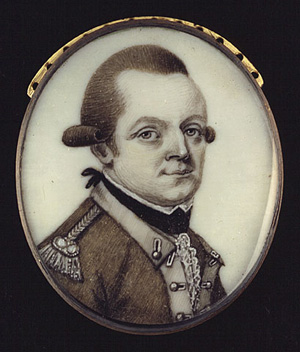
Daniel Claus, William Claus's father

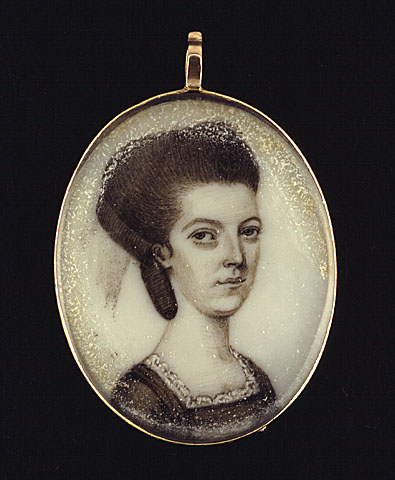
Ann Claus, William Claus's mother

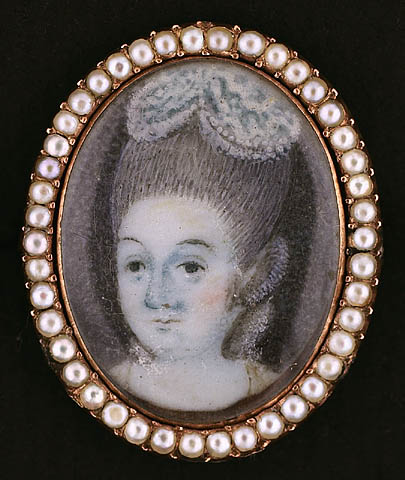
Catherine Jordan, William Claus's wife

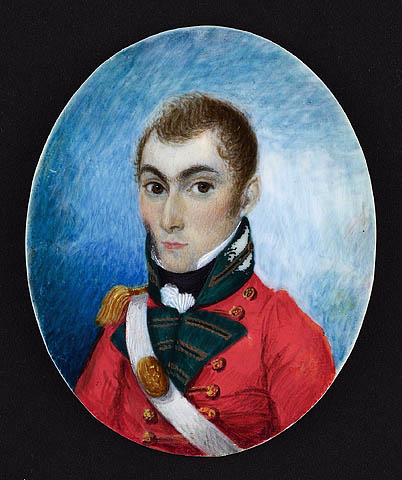
Daniel Claus, William Claus's son

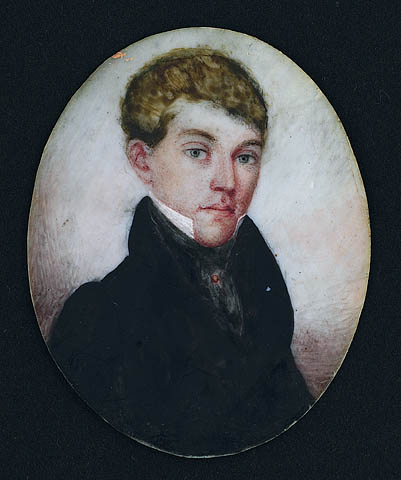
Warren Claus, William Claus's son
