= Guy Johnson =

British Indian Department officer, judge and politician

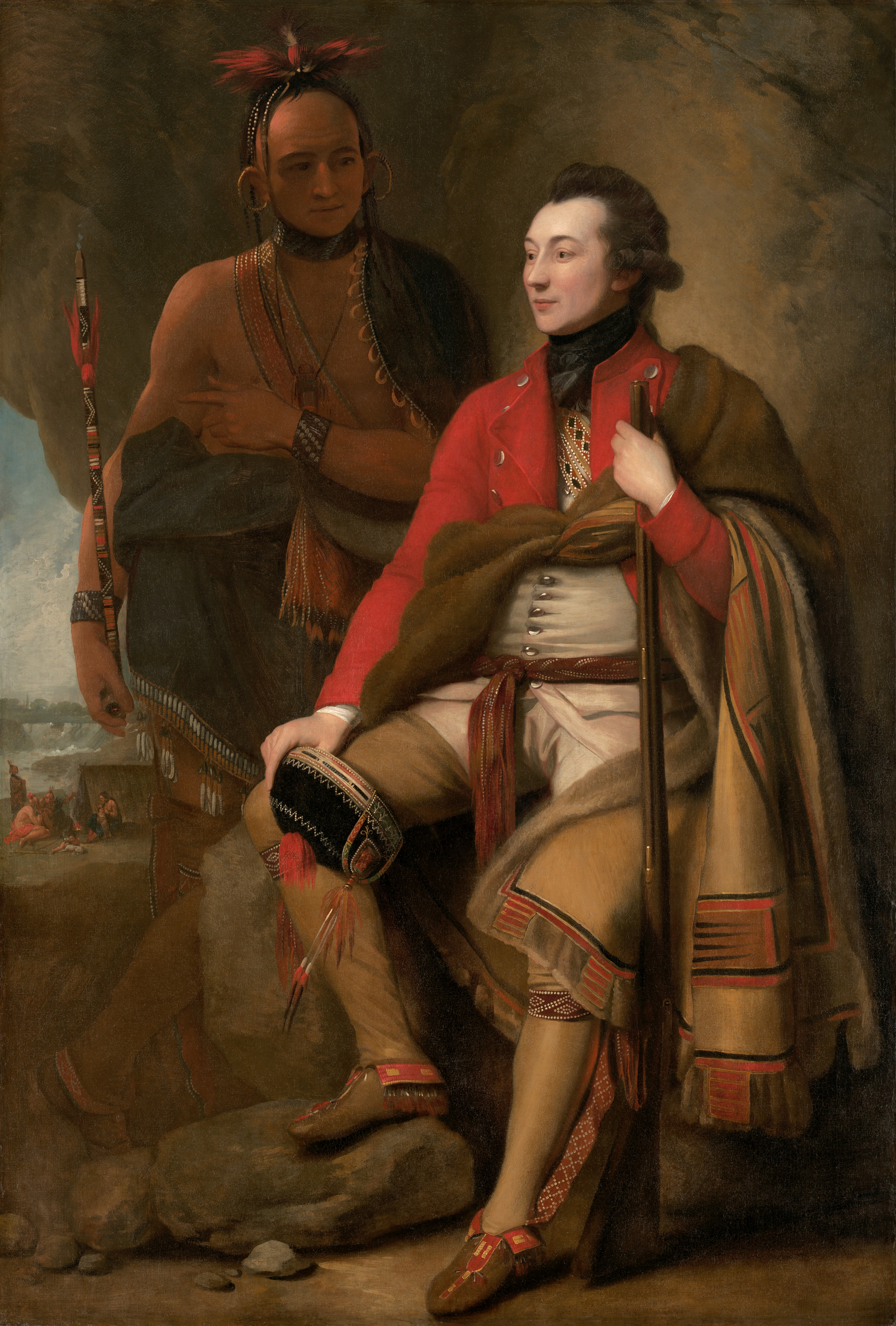
This painting by Benjamin West is usually identified as a portrait of Guy Johnson, although some historians argue that it depicts Sir William Johnson, Guy's uncle.

Guy Johnson (c. 1740 – 5 March 1788) was a British Indian Department officer, judge and politician. He served on the side of the British during the American Revolutionary War, having migrated to the Province of New York as a young man and worked with his uncle, Sir William Johnson, 1st Baronet who served as the Superintendent of Indian Affairs of the northern colonies.

Guy was appointed as William's successor in 1774. The following year, Johnson relocated with Loyalist supporters to Canada as tensions rose in New York during the American Revolution. He directed joint British-Mohawk military actions in the Mohawk Valley. Accused of falsifying reports, he went to London to defend himself after the war, and died there in 1788.

== Early life and education ==
Guy was the son of either John or Warren Johnson of Smithstown, Dunshaughlin, Co. Meath, each younger brothers of Sir William Johnson. The Johnsons were descendants of the O'Neill dynasty of Ireland.

In 1756, he sailed from Ireland and joined his uncle William in the Mohawk Valley of the Province of New York. He assisted his uncle, who was British Superintendent of Indian Affairs for the northern colonies. He was agent to the Iroquois, with whom the British had a strong trading diplomatic relationship.

== Marriage and family ==
On 1763, Guy Johnson married William's daughter Mary (Polly), one of his children by his first consort, Catherine Weisenberg. His uncle (now also father-in-law) gave them a square mile of land on the Mohawk River, located in what is now Amsterdam. In 1773, their first home was destroyed by a lightning strike.

They replaced it in 1774 with a large limestone house in the Georgian style, which they called Guy Park. Soon after, they were forced to leave because of rising tensions in the area prior to the American Revolution. With other Loyalists, they went to Canada to settle near Fort Niagara. On the way, Polly Johnson died at Oswego.

== Career ==
Guy Johnson became a deputy to Sir William in his uncle's position as British Superintendent of Indian Affairs. He learned much about the Mohawk and Iroquois. When William died in 1774 on the eve of the war, Guy succeeded him as superintendent. Guy Johnson also served as a county judge, a colonel in the Tryon County militia, and an elected member of the Province of New York Assembly.

=== American War of Independence ===
When the New York Committee of Safety committed the colony to armed resistance following the Battles of Lexington and Concord in 1775, Johnson remained loyal to the Crown and worked to control the Tryon County courts, assisted by fellow loyalists Sir John Johnson (Sir William's son) and Colonel Daniel Claus (also a son-in-law of Sir William). These three also commanded three regiments of the Tryon County militia. But, American Patriots in the Mohawk Valley soon drove the three Loyalists out of power.

Johnson received a letter from British commander General Gage, ordering him to take as many Iroquois warriors as he could recruit to Canada to join forces with General Carleton for a joint attack on New England. In May 1775, Johnson fled with about 120 other Loyalists, along with 90 Mohawk under chief John Deseronto, to British-controlled Canada. Along the way, he worked to secure the allegiance of the Iroquois League at a council at Oswego, New York in July. Johnson's wife Polly had died (and likely buried) at Oswego. He and the remainder of his party reached Montreal on 17 July.

In September 1775, John Campbell was appointed in Montreal as the superintendent of the Canadian Indians. General Guy Carleton, Governor-in-Chief of Quebec, told Johnson that he had no authority over any Indians in Canada and that the Iroquois were not to fight outside the Province of Quebec. Johnson decided to travel to England in November 1775, accompanied by the Mohawk leader Joseph Brant, to appeal his case directly with the British lords. The Lords appointed Johnson as the permanent superintendent for Indian affairs in the northern colonies, but with no authority in Canada.

Johnson and Brant returned to North America, landing in New York City in July 1776 after the city had been retaken by the British. He was ordered to stay in New York since he had no position in Canada. Johnson finally persuaded his superiors to let him do his "duty," and he returned to Canada in 1779.

He led forces against the colonials in the Mohawk Valley frontier, and his subordinates carried out the actions in what the Americans called massacres at Wyoming and Cherry valleys. This was also known as the "Burning of the Valleys". Back at Fort Niagara in 1779, Johnson helped to provide for the many Iroquois refugees made homeless by the Sullivan Expedition that year, which laid waste to their villages and food stores in western New York. He also organized counter-raids.

In 1781, General MacLean reported that Johnson's wartime accounts were "Extravagant, wonderful & fictitious, and the quality of articles so extraordinary, new & uncommon". Johnson was suspended as superintendent and summoned to Montreal, where the governor-in-chief, Frederick Haldimand, criticized his conduct as "reprehensible". Although never convicted, Johnson was in disgrace and in limbo. He went to London to defend his reports to the government and remained there. He died in 1788.

Sir John Johnson took over Fort Niagara as superintendent of Indian affairs in his cousin's absence; he was officially appointed to the position in March 1782.

== Legacy ==
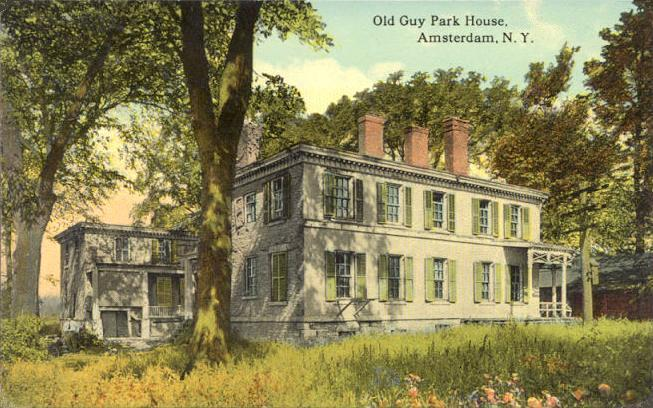
Guy Park house, Amsterdam, NY, c.1912 postcard

The state of New York confiscated the property of Loyalists and sold the house after the war. While in private hands, the house was used as a stagecoach stop during the extensive nineteenth-century westward migration through New York State. Since the early twentieth century, the house has been preserved as a state historic site. Recently used as the Walter Elwood Museum for local history, it was severely damaged in late August 2011 by the flooding caused by Hurricane Irene.
