= Dave Hill =

Dave Hill may refer to:

- Dave Hill (baseball) (1937–2018), American Major League Baseball pitcher
- Dave Hill (golfer) (1937–2011), American golfer
- Dave Hill (American football) (1941–2022), American football player
- Dave Hill (automotive engineer) (born 1943), American automotive engineer
- Dave Hill (politician) (born 1945), British socialist activist and writer
- Dave Hill (actor) (born 1945), British actor
- Dave Hill (guitarist) (born 1946), English guitarist associated with the band Slade
- Dave Hill (rugby league), rugby league footballer who played in the 1960s and 1970s for Bradford Northern
- Dave Hill (runner) (born 1952), Canadian Olympic middle-distance runner
- Dave Hill (footballer) (born 1966), English footballer and football manager
- Dave Hill (comedian), American comedian and musician
- Dave Hill (screenwriter) (born 1984), American screenwriter

== See also ==
- David Hill (disambiguation)
- Hill (surname)
