= David Haworth Hill =

Australian civil servant and philatelist

- Born: 1851; Manchester, England
- Died: 30 May 1926 (aged 74–75)

David Haworth Hill (1851 in Manchester – 30 May 1926) was an Australian civil servant and philatelist who was appointed to the Roll of Distinguished Philatelists in 1921.
