= Colonel Guy Johnson and Karonghyontye (Captain David Hill) =

Painting by Benjamin West

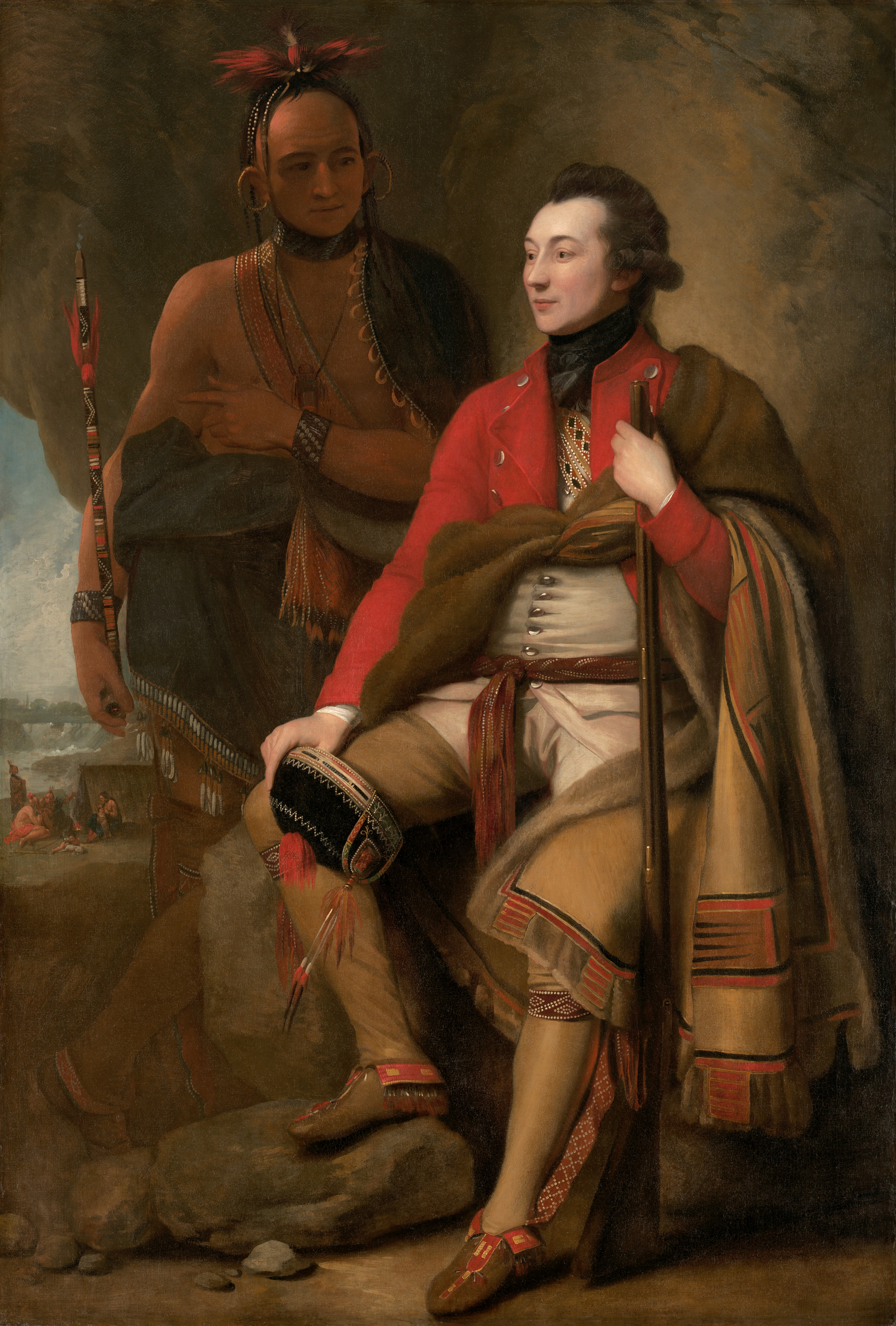
- Artist: Benjamin West
- Year: 1776
- Medium: Oil on canvas
- Dimensions: 202 cm × 138 cm (80 in × 54 in)
- Location: National Gallery of Art

Colonel Guy Johnson and Karonghyontye (Captain David Hill) is a 1776 dual portrait by the American painter Benjamin West, who specialised in historical painting and portraits. West was a co-founder of the Royal Academy in London, serving its president from 1792 to 1805 and again from 1806 to 1820.

The portrait depicts British Indian Department officer Guy Johnson and Mohawk chief David Hill. Johnson was the superintendent of the northern colonies of British North America and commissioned the portrait in 1776 while in London to secure that appointment. Sailing from Canada, Johnson was accompanied by Hill, who was a close friend. The alliance between Britain and several Indian tribes seriously threatened the rebel colonists' chances of victory during the American Revolutionary War.

In the portrait West signifies Johnson's role as ambassador to the Indians by equipping him in a red-coated uniform with moccasins, wampum belt, Indian blanket, and Mohawk cap. Karonghyontye is shown pointing to a peace pipe, while Johnson grasps a musket. This could suggest that harmony between Europeans and Indians will be maintained at all costs. The concept of cooperation extends to the background, where an Indian family gathers peacefully before a British military tent.
