= David Hill (Mohawk) =

Haudenosaunee leader and Royaner during American Revolution (1745–1790)

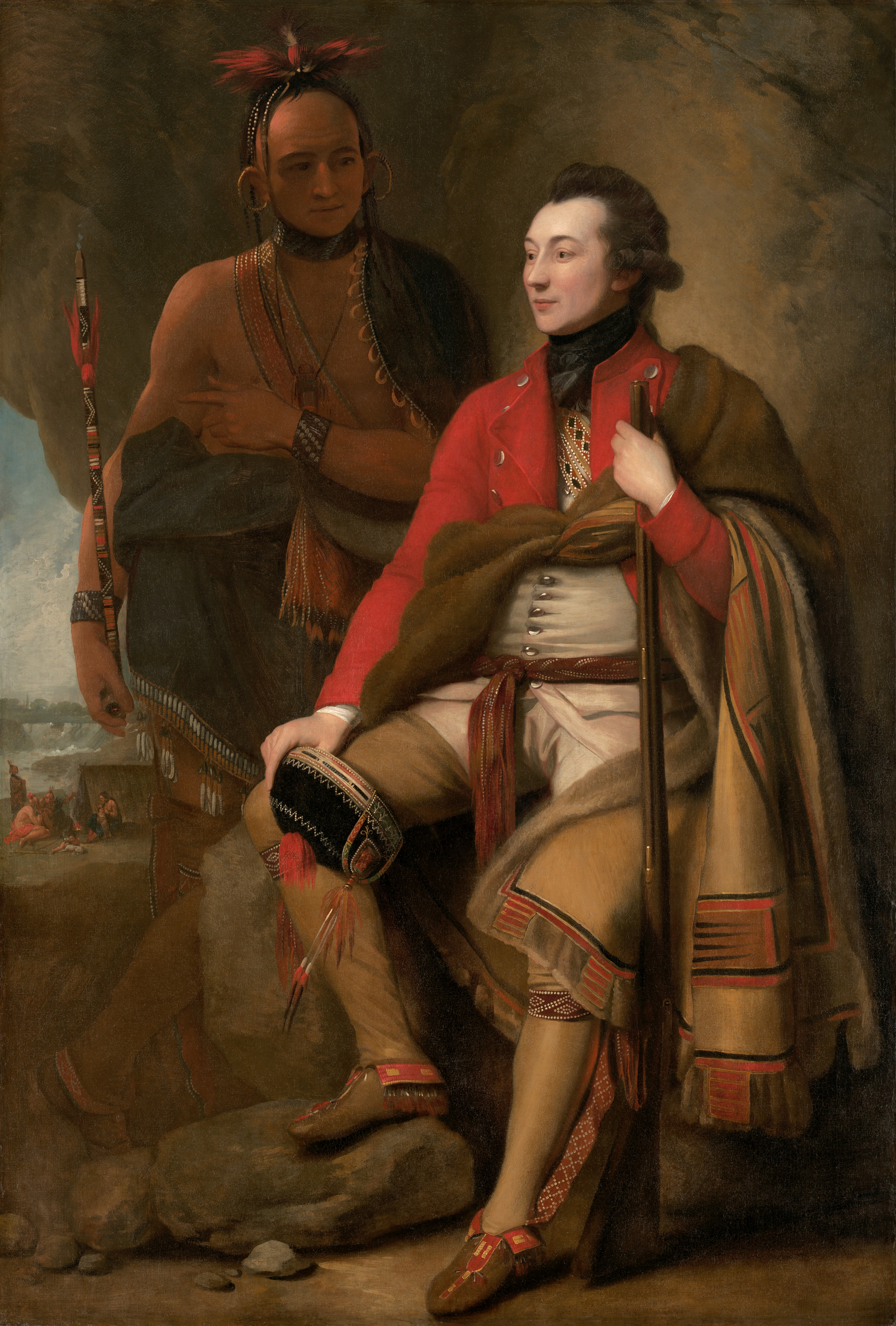
Colonel Guy Johnson and Karonghyontye (Captain David Hill)

Karonghyontye or David Hill, condoled as Rastaweseróntha (12 January 1745 – November 1790), was a Mohawk war chief and Royaner during the American Revolution. As a prominent war chief he is often titled "Captain" David Hill.

== Early life ==
Karonghyontye ("Flying Sky") was born in the Lower Mohawk Village of Tiononderoge, the son of Aaron Hill (Oseraghete) and Margaret Green (Tekonwanonronnih). A member of the Bear Clan, he was the brother of Aaron Hill (Kanonraron), who also became a prominent war chief in the American Revolution.

Hill married Esther Spring (or Springstead) (Dekahondagweh) around 1770. The couple had six children. At some point, Hill was condoled with the Royaner name Astawenserontha (Mohawk: Rastaweseróntha, "Wearing Rattles").

== American Revolutionary War ==
Like the other Mohawks, Hill was a Loyalist, a close associate of William Johnson and a friend of Joseph Brant. Among other things, David and his brother Aaron accompanied British Captain John Munro on his raid of Ballston, New York in 1780.

== Death ==
Hill died in Brantford, Ontario in 1790. His wife. Esther, died in 1838, also in Brantford.

== See also ==
- Colonel Guy Johnson and Karonghyontye (Captain David Hill)
