= David Hill (wide receiver) =

German gridiron football player (born 1977)

David Hill Jr.
Profile
- Position: Wide Receiver / Linebacker / Football Coach

Personal information
- Born: July 28, 1977 (age 49); Heidelberg, Germany
- Listed height: 6 ft 2 in (1.88 m)
- Listed weight: 230 lb (104 kg)

Career information
- High school: Eufaula High School, AL
- College: Auburn University/Troy State
- NFL draft: 2001: undrafted

Career history
- Carolina Rhinos (2001); Mobile Wizards (2002); Greensboro Prowlers (2003); Atlanta Falcons (2004)*; Detroit Fury (2004); Austin Wranglers (2005)
- * Offseason or practice squad member only

Career AFL statistics
- Receptions: 166
- Receiving yards: 4786
- Receiving TDs: 41
- Tackles: 45
- Stats at ArenaFan.com

David Hill Jr. (born July 28, 1977) is a former American football Wide Receiver/Linebacker for the Detroit Fury and the Austin Wranglers in the Arena Football League. Hill previously coached at Florida A & M University where he developed two NFL Wide Receivers. Hill is now in his 9th season as the Wide Receivers Coach at Colquitt County High School(GA). While at Holmes, Hill developed All-American and New York Jets Wide Receiver Jonathan Rumph.

Hill was also a four sport athlete. He appeared on the first ever Arena Football 2006 video game by EA Sports.
