= David Hill Memorial School =

Former school in Hankou, China

The David Hill memorial school was a school for blind girls in Hankou, China. It was affiliated with the Wesleyan Church.

The school was founded in 1883. It was looted in 1911 when Hankou fell to imperial troops.
