= Daniel Claus =

Deputy Agent in the British Indian Department and British loyalist

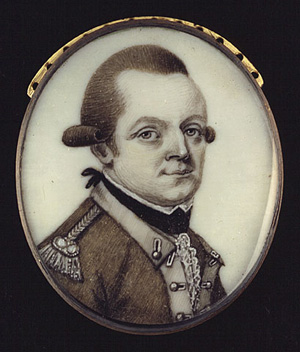

Deputy Agent of Indian Affairs
- In office September 20, 1760 – November 9, 1787

Personal details
- Born: 13 September 1727 Bönnigheim, Germany
- Died: 9 November 1787 (aged 60) Cardiff, Wales
- Spouse: Ann Johnson (m. 1762)
- Children: William Claus
- Parent(s): Adam Frederic Claus; Anna Dorothea

Military service
- Allegiance: Great Britain
- Branch/service: Indian Department
- Rank: Colonel
- Battles/wars: Seven Years' War; American Revolutionary War

Christian Daniel Claus (1727—1787) was a Deputy Agent in the British Indian Department and a prominent Loyalist during the American Revolution.

He was born September 13, 1727, at Bönnigheim, Württemberg the son of Adam Frederic Claus and his wife Anna Dorothea. He arrived in America in 1749. In 1755, he was made a Lieutenant in the Indian Department and a Deputy Secretary of Indian Affairs.

He had lived with Joseph Brant and the Mohawks for a while and could speak their language.

In September 1775, he was replaced as the deputy superintendent by Major John Campbell. In November, Daniel Claus sailed to London to appeal his case before the British House of Lords. He was given the post of deputy confined to working with the Iroquois refugees in Canada. In August, 1777, he was appointed as agent of the Six Nations Indians by Frederick Haldimand.

He died November 9, 1787, near Cardiff, Wales.

== Family ==
Claus married Ann "Nancy" (Johnson) Weisenberg. Their son, William Claus (1765–1826), was a leading figure in Upper Canada, where he was a member of the Executive Council, a prominent militia officer during the War of 1812, and the Deputy Superintendent of the Indian Department. Daniel's father-in-law was Sir William Johnson, who was commissioned as the British Empire's first superintendent of Indian affairs from 1755 to 1774, and whose son, Sir John Johnson, was Superintendent General of Indian Affairs from 1782 to 1828.
