= 1768 in art =

Events from the year 1768 in art.

== Events ==
- December 10 – Royal Academy founded in London, with Joshua Reynolds as its first President.
- Tilly Kettle becomes the first English painter to work in India.

== Works ==
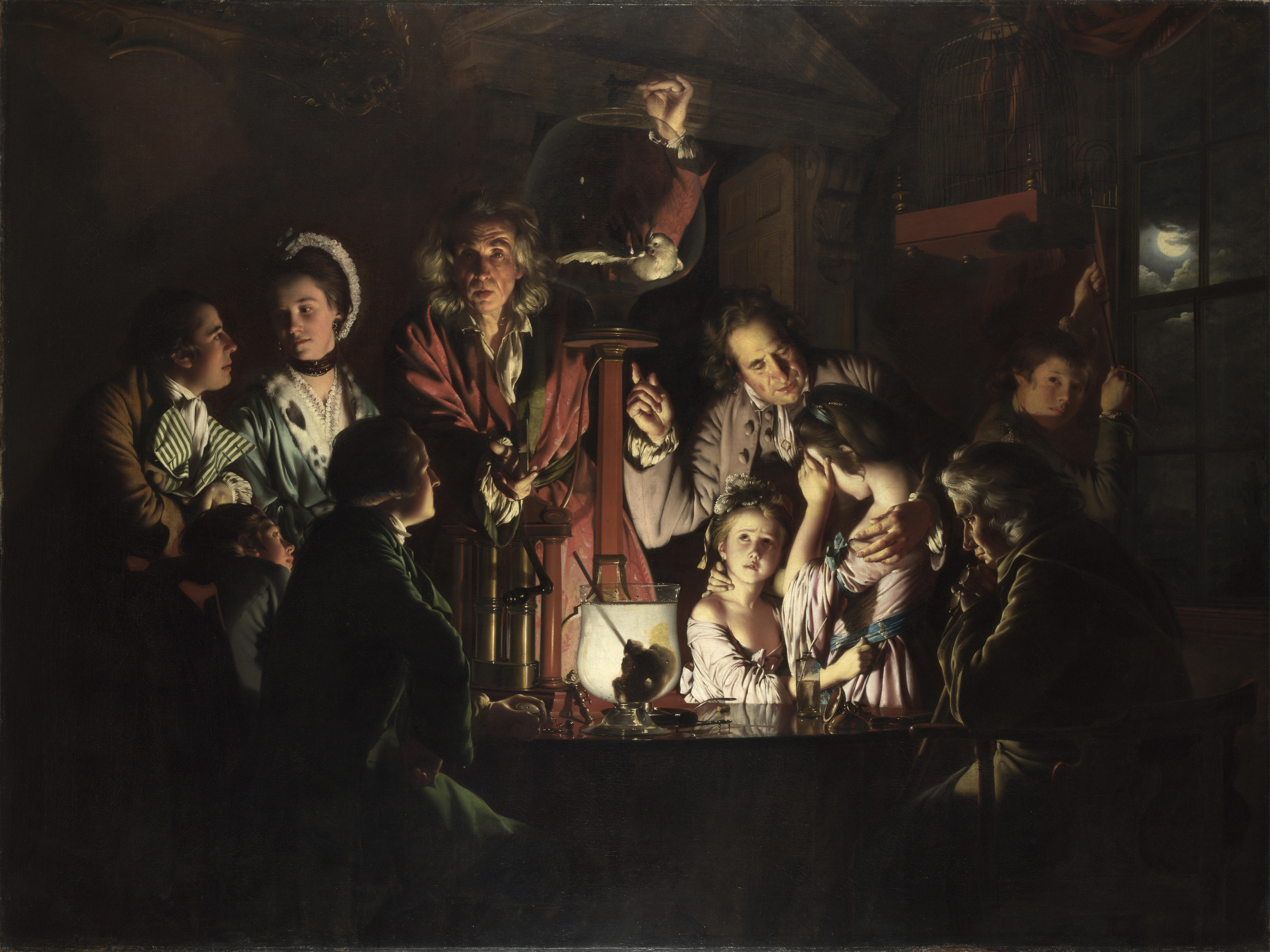
Joseph Wright, An Experiment on a Bird in the Air Pump, 1768, National Gallery, London

- Pompeo Batoni
  - Portrait of the Duke of Devonshire
  - Portrait of Sir Gregory Page-Turner
- John Singleton Copley – Portrait of Thomas Gage
- Francis Cotes – The Young Cricketer
- Thomas Gainsborough
  - Elizabeth and Thomas Linley (circa)
  - Ignatius Sancho
- Sir Joshua Reynolds
  - Mrs Abington as the Comic Muse (approximate date)
  - Portrait of the Marquess of Rockingham
- Alexander Roslin – The Lady with the Veil (The Artist's Wife)
- Jacques Saly – Frederik V on Horseback (bronze cast)
- Dominic Serres – The Captured Spanish Fleet at Havana
- Benjamin West – General Johnson Saving a Wounded French Officer from the Tomahawk of a North American Indian
- Joseph Wright of Derby – An Experiment on a Bird in the Air Pump
- Johan Zoffany
  - Charles Macklin as Shylock
  - The Porter and the Hare

== Births ==
- March 2 – Benjamin Duterrau, English painter, etcher, engraver, sculptor and art lecturer (died 1851)
- March 10 – Domingos Sequeira, Portuguese painter (died 1837)
- March 19 – François Joseph Bosio, French sculptor (died 1845)
- April 18 – Jean-Baptiste Debret, French painter of lithographs depicting the people of Brazil (died 1848)
- May 5 – Ezra Ames, American portrait painter (died 1836)
- June 29 – Vincenzo Dimech, Maltese sculptor (died 1831)
- July 10 – Hendrik Voogd, Dutch painter and printmaker, who was active in Italy (died 1839)
- July 27 – Joseph Anton Koch, Austrian painter of the German Romantic movement (died 1839)
- August 22 – Josef Abel, historical painter and etcher (died 1818)
- December 18 – Marie-Guillemine Benoist, French neoclassical, historical and genre painter (died 1826)
- December 22 – John Crome, English artist in the Romantic era (died 1821)
- date unknown
  - Pierre Audouin, French engraver (died 1822)
  - Juliane Wilhelmine Bause, German landscape etcher (died 1837)
  - Andrey Yefimovich Martynov, Russian painter and engraver (died 1826)
  - Charlotta Malm-Reuterholm, Finnish painter (died 1845)
  - Vasily Rodchev, Russian history painter (died 1803)
  - Peter Edward Stroehling, portrait artist from either Germany or the Russian Empire (died 1826)
  - Elkanah Tisdale, American engraver, miniature painter and cartoonist (died 1835)

== Deaths ==
- January 26 – Tibout Regters, Dutch portrait painter (born 1710)
- April 10 – Giovanni Antonio Canal, better known as Canaletto, Venetian artist famous for his landscapes, or vedute, of Venice (born 1697)
- April 14 – Francesco Monti, Italian fresco painter (born 1683)
- April 24 – Johann Valentin Tischbein, German theatre painter (born 1715)
- April 29 – Filippo della Valle, Italian sculptor (born 1698)
- June 11 – Stefano Pozzi, Italian painter, designer, draughtsman and decorator (died 1699/1707)
- August 18 – Giovanni Domenico Ferretti, Italian Rococo painter from Florence (born 1692)
- August 24 – Isaac Basire, English engraver and head of family of engravers (born 1704)
- November 5 – Giorgio Duranti, Italian painter of still lifes (born 1683)
- December 8 – Jean Denis Attiret, French Jesuit missionary and painter (born 1702)
- date unknown
  - Johan Backman, Finnish painter (born 1706)
  - Antonio Baldi, Italian painter and engraver (born 1692)
  - Miguel Cabrera, indigenous Zapotec painter, (born 1695)
  - Samuel Collins, British miniature painter (born 1735)
  - Giovanni Domenico Campiglia, Italian painter and engraver from Florence (born 1692)
  - Charles Cressent, French furniture-maker, sculptor and fondeur-ciseleur of the régence style (born 1685)
