= 1692 in art =

Events from the year 1692 in art.

== Events ==
- The Academy of Fine Arts Vienna is founded by the court painter Peter Strudel.
- Godfrey Kneller, court painter in England, is knighted.
- On a winter evening, painter Emanuel de Witte commits suicide by jumping from a bridge with a rope around his neck. The canal freezes over and his body is not found for several weeks.

== Paintings ==
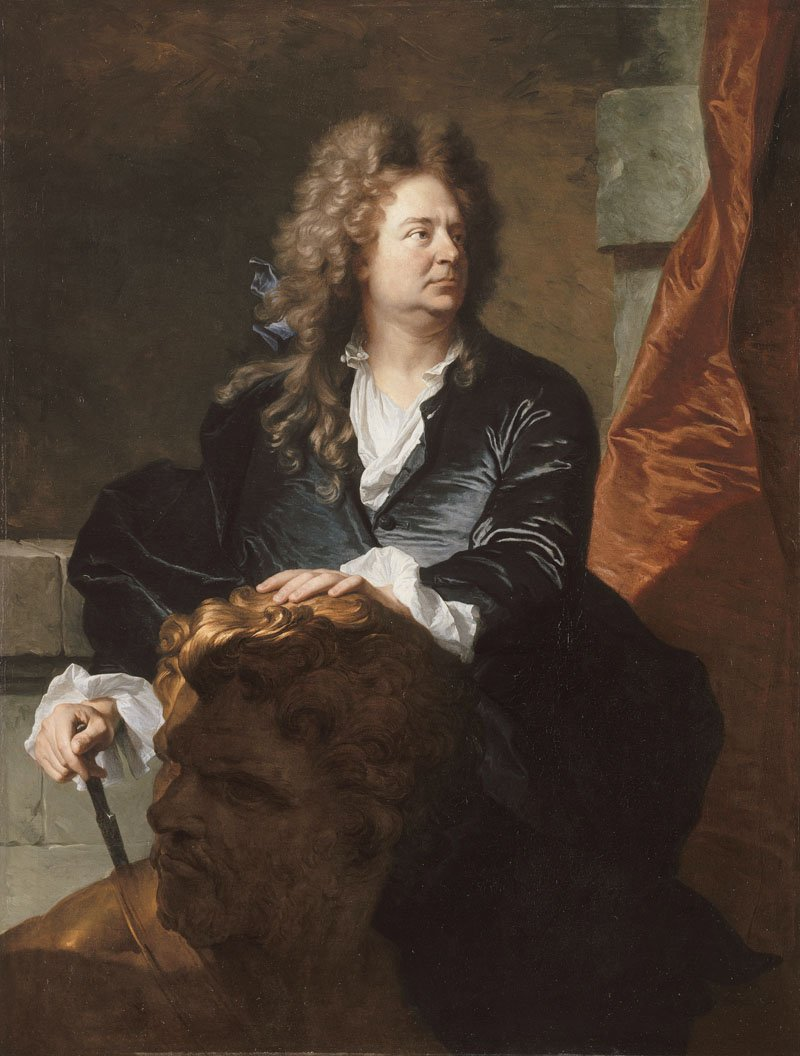
Rigaud - Portrait of Martin Desjardins

- Antoine Coypel – Democritus
- Cornelis Dusart – The Pedlar
- Sir Godfrey Kneller – Portraits of Lord Archibald Hamilton and Katharine Howard
- Hyacinthe Rigaud
  - La famille Léonard
  - Portrait of Martin Desjardins
- Johann Michael Rottmayr – The Baptism of St. Ottilia by St. Erhard (Erhardkirche, Salzburg)
- Dome of the Monastery of the Holy Trinity, Meteora, Greece

== Births ==
- June 13 – Joseph Highmore, British portrait and historical painter (died 1780)
- September 1 (baptized) – Egid Quirin Asam, German plasterer and sculptor active during the period of the Late Baroque (died 1750)
- date unknown
  - Antonio Baldi, Italian painter and engraver (died 1768)
  - Vittorio Bigari, Italian painter (died 1776)
  - Giovanni Domenico Campiglia, Italian painter and engraver from Florence (died 1768)
  - Giovanni Domenico Ferretti, Italian Rococo-style painter from Florence (died 1768)
  - Jacob Folkema, Dutch designer and engraver (died 1767)
  - Giovanni Giacomo Monti, Italian painter of quadratura (d. unknown)
  - Francesco Zucchi, Italian engraver (died 1764)

== Deaths ==
- January 3 – Roelant Roghman, Dutch Golden Age painter and engraver (born 1627)
- March – Willem de Heusch, Dutch landscape painter (born 1625)
- April – Abraham-César Lamoureux, French sculptor working in Scandinavia (buried April 27)
- April 23 – Pieter Withoos, Dutch Golden Age painter (born 1655)
- July – David Loggan, Danzig-born English artist (born 1635)
- July 22 – Pietro del Po, Italian painter (born 1616)
- September 28 – Cornelis Bloemaert, Dutch painter and engraver (born 1603)
- date unknown
  - Pietro Aquila, Italian painter and printmaker (born 1630)
  - Charles Beaubrun, French portrait painter (born 1604)
  - José de Cieza, Spanish painter (born 1656)
  - Prosper Henricus Lankrink, Flemish painter and art collector working in England (born 1628)
  - Theodore Poulakis, Greek Renaissance painter (born 1622)
  - Emanuel de Witte, Dutch perspective painter (born 1617)
