= Vincenzo Re =

Italian scenic designer

Vincenzo Re (1695–1762) was an Italian scenic designer. Born in Parma, Duchy of Parma and Piacenza, Re began his career in Turin. In 1737 he became the assistant designer under Pietro Righini at the newly formed Teatro di San Carlo, ultimately replacing him as head designer in 1740. He remained at that post until his death 22 years later in 1762. During his years there, he designed and built sets for well over 100 stage works, including operas, plays, and ballets. Many of his set designs required him to invent new forms of theatrical machinery. He also occasionally served as director for some of the productions.

In addition to his work at the Teatro di San Carlo, Re occasionally worked for smaller theatres, sometimes collaborating with Giuseppe and Antonio Baldi. He also invented theatrical machinery for a variety of festivities in the Naples area and prepared compositions for dramas and celebrations that were held in the Court Theatre and in the palaces of the nobility. Fifteen of his set designs were engraved on tablets by Giuseppe Vasi, some of which are part of the permanent collection at the Victoria and Albert Museum in London.
