= Giuseppe Vasi =

Italian engraver and architect

- Piazza di S. Giovanni in Laterano. Engraving by Giuseppe Vasi, c. 1747
- Born: 27 August 1710; Corleone, Kingdom of Sicily
- Died: 16 April 1782 (aged 71); Rome, Papal States
- Occupations: Engraver; Architect
- Known for: Etching
- Movement: Neoclassicism
- Patrons: Troiano Acquaviva d'Aragona

Giuseppe Vasi (27 August 1710 – 16 April 1782) was an Italian engraver and architect, best known for his vedute.

== Biography ==
He was born in Corleone, Sicily, and trained as a printmaker in Palermo, possibly at the Collegio Carolino. In 1736 he contributed illustrations to Pietro La Placa's La reggia in trionfo, which described the celebrations in Palermo for the coronation of Charles of Bourbon, the future Charles III of Spain. That year he moved to Rome, where Cardinal Troiano Acquaviva d'Aragona took him under his protection and he met other artists working for the same patron, including Sebastiano Conca, Luigi Vanvitelli, and Ferdinando Fuga. He later lived and worked in the Palazzo Farnese, where he engraved the plates for the festivals of the Chinea. After a period of intense visits and studies, Vasi started to work as an engraver in the Calcografia Camerale, the main public institution of Rome devoted to engraving and etching, founded some years before by Pope Clement XII. His views for the Calcografia include panoramas of the Trevi Fountain and of the Spanish Steps.

Later on Vasi started to work on his own, producing and selling series of his views to a public made principally of grand tourists. The first such series was the Vedute di Roma sul Tevere (Views of the Tiber), of the early 1740s, later adapted to become part of the Magnificenze di Roma antica e moderna. In these years the young Giovanni Battista Piranesi, his most important pupil, studied in his workshop, where Vasi taught him the technique of single-cut engraving.

From 1747 to 1761 Vasi published Delle magnificenze di Roma antica e moderna, ten books of vedute of Rome organized by type of building, from gates and squares to churches, palaces, and villas. Each book has 20 full-page plates, with smaller vignettes in the text. The accompanying historical commentary was written by Giuseppe Bianchini for the first book and by Vasi from the third onward. He also created 15 tablet engravings of opera scenes designed by Vincenzo Re, some of which are part of the collection at the Victoria and Albert Museum in London.

In 1763 he published a guidebook, the Itinerario istruttivo, which led visitors through the city in eight days. It was updated repeatedly during his lifetime, and after his death his son Mariano Vasi (1744–1820), also an engraver, published further editions. In 1765 Vasi published his best-known work, the Prospetto dell'alma città di Roma, a panorama of Rome seen from the Janiculum and dedicated to Charles III. Its key of 390 sites uses the same numbering as the Itinerario. His Nuova pianta di Roma in prospettiva (1781) was modelled on Giovanni Battista Falda's map of Rome of 1676.

== Reputation ==
While his reputation has been overshadowed by that of his pupil Piranesi, Vasi was highly successful and well-regarded in the 18th century. In the Enciclopedia Italiana (1937), Alfredo Petrucci described Vasi's views as scrupulously exact and of great documentary value, and wrote that despite a somewhat monotonous engraving style they show a lyrical feeling for the city and anticipate effects later typical of Piranesi. His views of the Tiber were directly influenced by those of Gaspar van Wittel. In recent years there has been a significant critical reappraisal of Vasi's work. Modern studies of his work include Luisa Scalabroni's monograph (1981), Paolo Coen's work on the Magnificenze and on the Vasi workshop, and the exhibition Giuseppe Vasi's Rome: Lasting Impressions from the Age of the Grand Tour, held at the Jordan Schnitzer Museum of Art in Eugene, Oregon (25 September 2010 – 2 January 2011) and the Princeton University Art Museum in Princeton, New Jersey (6 March – 12 June 2011).

== Works (selected) ==
Veduta of Porta del Popolo, Rome

View of Palazzo Montecitorio, 1753

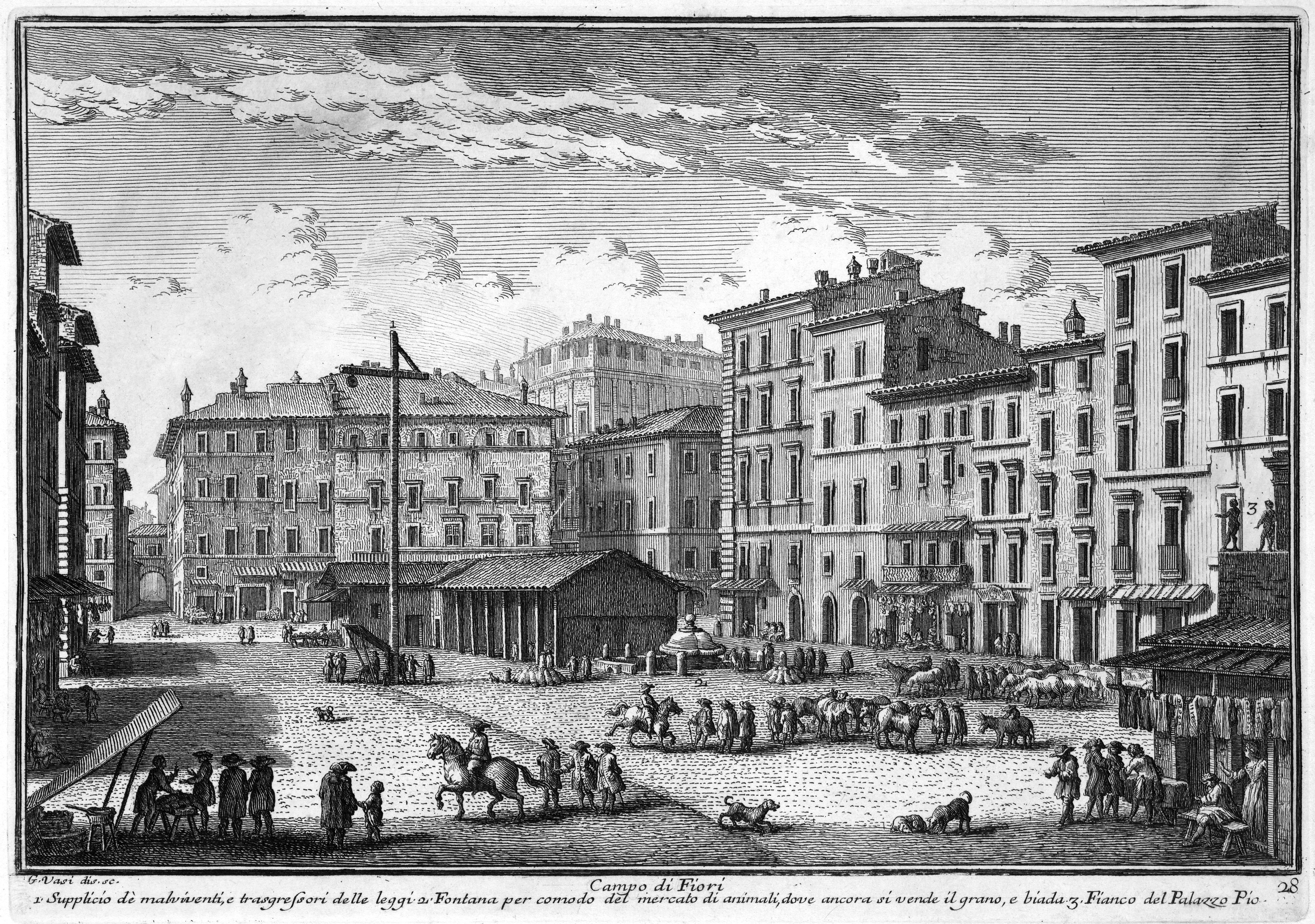
Etching of Campo de' Fiori, Rome, 1740s, Vasi

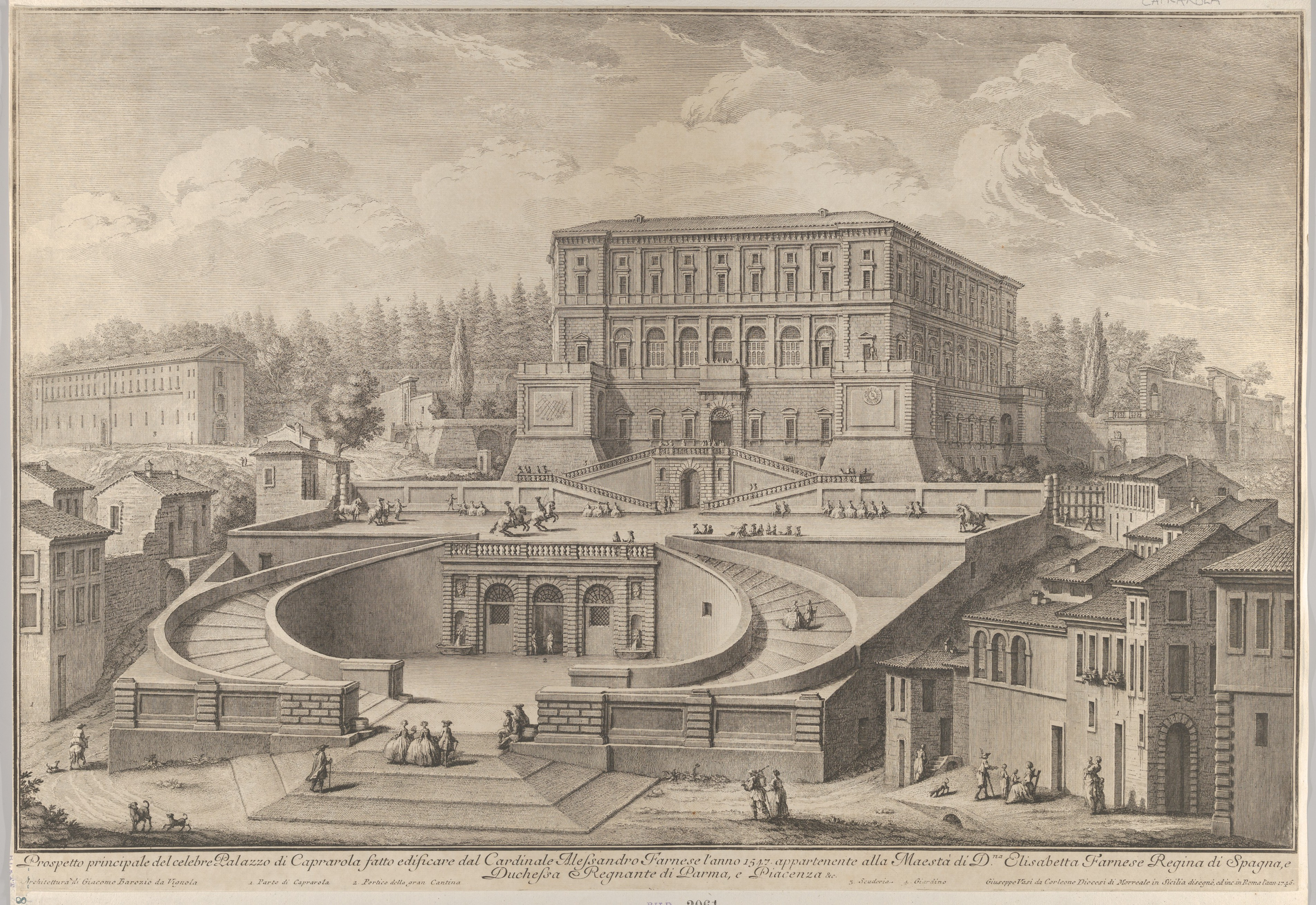
View of the Villa Farnese, 1746–48, Metropolitan Museum of Art

View of the Porto di Ripetta, c. 1750

The Farnese Bull, 1772, Rijksmuseum

View of Piazza del Popolo, Rijksmuseum

Interior of the Pantheon. Engraving by Giuseppe Vasi, National Library of Poland

== Selected modern bibliography ==
- Olschki, Cesare (1926). "Le magnificenze di Roma di Giuseppe Vasi". Emporium. LXIV (383): 312–320.
- Scalabroni, Luisa (1981). Giuseppe Vasi. Rome: Multigrafica.
- Michel, Olivier (2003). "Vasi, Giuseppe". Grove Art Online. Oxford: Oxford University Press. doi:10.1093/gao/9781884446054.article.T088234.
- Coen, Paolo (2006). Le Magnificenze di Roma di Giuseppe Vasi (2nd ed.). Rome: Newton and Compton.
- Coen, Paolo (2001). "Arte, cultura e mercato in una bottega romana del XVIII secolo: l'impresa calcografica di Giuseppe e Mariano Vasi, fra continuità e rinnovamento". Bollettino d'Arte. 115: 23–74.
- James G. Harper & James T. Tice, Giuseppe Vasi's Rome: Lasting Impressions from the Age of the Grand Tour, exh. cat., Jordan Schnitzer Museum of Art & the Princeton University Art Museum 2010 (distributed by the University of Delaware Press), 2010
- Maier, Jessica (2013). "Giuseppe Vasi's "Nuova Pianta di Roma" (1781): Cartography, Prints, and Power in "Settecento" Rome". Eighteenth-Century Studies. 46 (2): 259–279. JSTOR 23524255.
- Dixon, Susan M. (2016). "Vasi, Piranesi, and the Accademia degli Arcadi: Toward a Definition of Arcadianism in the Visual Arts". Memoirs of the American Academy in Rome. 61: 219–262. JSTOR 44988079.
