= Jean Erdman, Baron Dieskau =

German-born French general and commander (1701–1867)

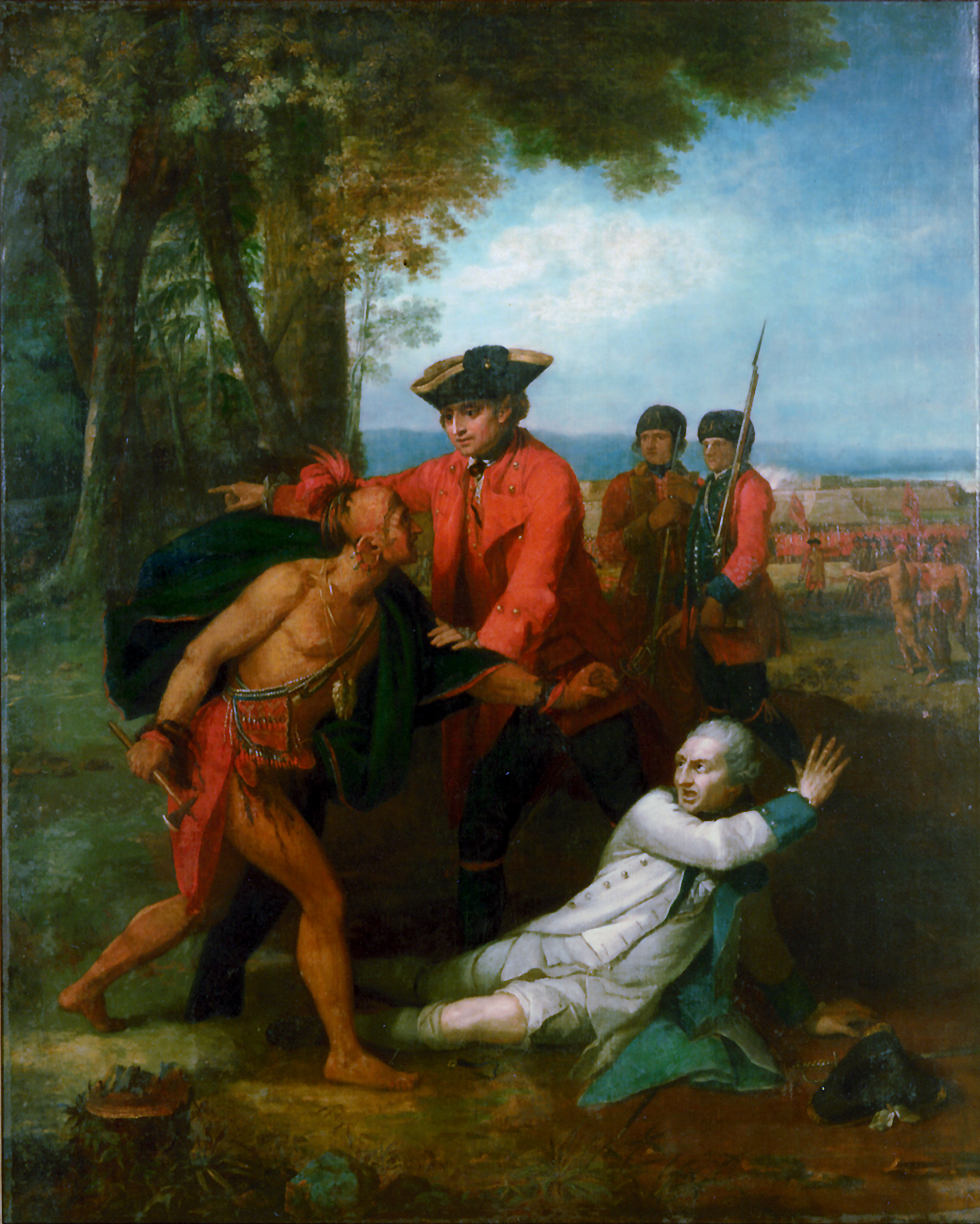
- Benjamin West's depiction of William Johnson sparing Dieskau's life after the Battle of Lake George
- Born: 1701; Dresden, Saxony
- Died: 8 September 1767 (aged 65–66); Paris or Suresnes
- Military career
- Allegiance: France
- Branch: France Army
- Service years: 1733–1755
- Rank: Major general
- Conflicts: War of the Austrian Succession; Seven Years' War
- Awards: Order of Saint Louis

Major-General Jean Erdman, Baron Dieskau (alternatively Jean-Armand Dieskau) (1701 – 8 September 1767) was a Saxon Born French Royal Army officer who served in the War of the Austrian Succession and French and Indian War. He is most prominent for his capture at the Battle of Lake George.

== Earl Life and Career ==
Jean Erdman, Baron Dieskau was born in Saxony in 1701, joining the French Royal Army in 1720.

His early military career was spent training under, and latterly as the aide-de-camp of Marshal Maurice de Saxe. Dieskau visited St. Petersburg in 1741 as Saxe's adjutant. In 1745, Dieskau served in Flanders and took part in The Battle of Fontenoy. He also served in the Netherlands and in 1748 became Major General of infantry and commander of Brest.

== The French and Indian War ==
As conflict in 'The New World' loomed, Dieskau was selected for command due to his emboldened character and experience under Saxe. He was sent to Canada on the 20th of February 1755 as the head of French troops to conduct the campaign against the British.

During the Atlantic crossing, Dieskau's second in command, colonel Rostaing, was killed when the Alcide was captured on the Battle of June the 8th. Later that month, he landed at Quebec with the newly appointed Governor General of New France, Pierre de Rigaud de Vaudreuil de Cavagnial.

Dieskau's army consisted of 1,600 Canadians, many of whom had been called away from their farms; 600 Iroquois from Sault and the Lake of the Two Mountains missions; and 700 regular French troops.

=== Planned Attack on Fort Edward ===
Initially, Dieskau was ordered by the Governor General to attack Oswego, however intelligence suggested that Sir William Johnson was leading a force of 3,000 men to Crown Point. However, when Dieskau arrived, Johnson was at Fort Edward, 14 miles distant, proving his intelligence was unreliable.

On the 27th of August, he received inconsistent reports that between 500 and 3,000 British soldiers were establishing Fort Lyman, later known as Fort Edward, and that it was likely both undermanned and poorly defended. Dieskau made the decision to move his force to Ticonderoga, and form a column of 1,500 men: 220 regular French soldiers from the Queen's and Languedoc regiments; 680 Canadian irregulars, and 600 Iroquois, all with 10 days provisions.

On the 2nd of September, Dieskau led his forces up Lake Champlain, depositing a detachment of 120 men at marshland near the Lake. By the 7th, the force had reached the road to Lake George, encountering a dispatch rider sent by Sir William Johnson to General Phineas Lyman revealing that the British were expecting a French attack, who they shot. A group of waggoners were then attacked, who revealed that there were 3,000 British troops at Fort Edward.

Dieskau planned a surprise attack on the fort at sundown, believing English provincial troops to be poor quality. However the Iroquois, while initially unwilling to take part in the assault, over manoeuvred and, whether purposefully or not, overshot the Fort by three miles, leading to the plan being abandoned.

=== Battle of Lake George ===
On the 8th of September, Dieskau moved North to attack an encampment of British soldiers eleven miles away at Lake George.At around 10 am, he was informed by Iroquois scouts that a body of around 1,000 men under Colonel Ephraim Williams of Massachusetts, and Hendrick Theyanoguin were approaching to the South of Lake George.

Dieskau's split his force into a horseshoe, and prepared to ambush the British on the road: the Iroquois on the left, Canadians behind and flanking, and the French some paces in front, to encircle the British completely. Dieskau is reported to have claimed: "I will put the raw countrymen to rout, and will not hold my hand until they are chased back to Albany."

Why the ambush failed is unclear, reports claim that Christian Iroquois under the French triggered the ambush early, likely as a result of their desire not to kill indigenous soldiers fighting under the British. Another suggested waggoners using the road reported to the British the French positions. However, the English column was caught unawares, and in the resulting ambush both Hendrick and Williams were killed; the English, according to Dieskau "folded together as a pack of cards." During the skirmish, Legardeur de Saint Pierre was killed.

Dieskau led his French forces in pursuit of the retreating British back to their encampment at the South of Lake George, where the forces of Sir William Johnson had constructed hasty defences with waggons and felled trees. However, his indigenous forces fell behind: the Abenakis had captured British-Mohawk prisoners and the French Iroquois insisted they released them, leaving the French and Canadians advancing without support, their scattering among the trees for cover. Dieskau's force of 200 was quickly diminished by effective British Artillery, and musket fire. Many of his indigenous soldiers would abandon their positions to scalp and loot the dead British soldiers.

At around 4 pm, Dieskau was shot three times at once: once in the knee, causing him to fall. Pierre-Andre Gohin de Montreuil, Dieskau's second in command, placed him against a tree stump, where Dieskau asked Montreuil to take command, retreat, and that he should be carried from the field. Two Canadian soldiers attempted to evacuate him, but one was shot, falling across his legs, and the other fled. He was left abandoned amid the former French position.

When British soldiers approached him, Dieskau was shot through the hand and both thighs by a former French soldier now fighting for the British, who believed he may have had a pistol, a wound that ultimately caused Dieskau's death over a decade later. He was then carried on a blanket to the tent of Sir William Johnson, to whom he declared his rank. Johnson sought to save him from British aligned Mohawks who wanted revenge for the death of Hendrick Theyanoguin, and suggested burning Dieskau.

Daniel Claus wrote: "I was with the French General [Dieskau] for Several hours after...brought in General Johnson's Tent and attended him." He later continued "It was now late & Gen. Johnson came in from the lines to see how the french Gen. did & pleased to find that he was left quiet & could converse with Mr. Claus."

== Later Life and Death ==
After his capture at the Battle of Lake George, Dieskau struggled with illnesses caused by injuries sustained during the Battle of Lake George, Diderot describing that he "lives, if you call that a living." Some contemporary sources reported him killed at the Battle.

The day after, he was spurned and humiliated by General Phineas Lyman, who accused him of using poisoned musket balls, recorded by Sir William Johnson as: "now pestered with reproaches by Gen. Lyman who charged his troops with firing poisond [sic] Balls the day before...to forebear giving Uneasiness to a Gentmn. in such Pain & Agonies, for he [Lyman] came every day for several days parading with two large Musquateer Cartridge Boxes slung across his Body & a french Musket on his Shoulder."

He was the guest of General Philip Schuyler in Albany on the 16th of September 1755, and was then taken to the Government New York with other French prisoners on the 13th of October, where he was treated by an English surgeon for two of his wounds. Before leaving New York, Dieskau presented Sir William Johnson a sword, as a mark of their friendship. In March 1756 he sailed for Britain, arriving in Falmouth on the 7th of April, and stayed for a period in Bath, where he received 100 guineas from Lord William Barrington.

Dieskau was kept a prisoner until 1763, when he was exchanged and returned to France, and provided a pension and honours. French command in Canada passed to Louis-Joseph de Montcalm.

Dieskau died near Paris in 1767. His epitaph read "Baron Dieskau died from the effects of his wounds received at Lake George (September 8, 1755) on the 8th of September 1767, at Turenne in France."
