= Tommaso Redi =

Italian painter

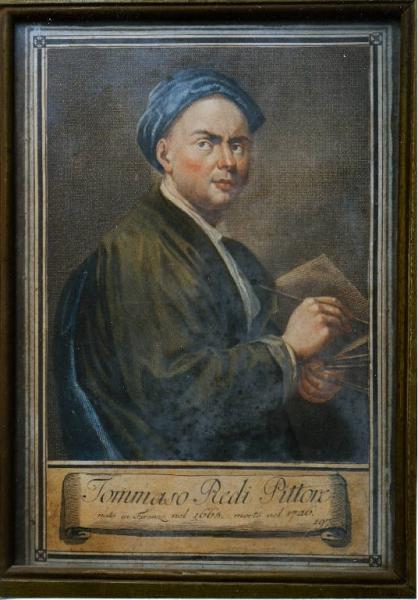
Self-Portrait

Tommaso Redi (22 December 1665 – 10 October 1726) was an Italian painter, active during the late-Baroque in his native Florence then part of the Grand Duchy of Tuscany.

He initially apprenticed with the Florentine painter Anton Domenico Gabbiani (1652–1726), and then moved to Rome to work in the Medici Academy in that city, which employed Carlo Maratti and Ciro Ferri as teachers. He returned to Florence to paint in the Palazzo Pitti and also was a respected portrait painter. When the Czar Peter visited Florence, he was particularly struck with the works of Redi, and being desirous of establishing an academy for the promotion of the fine arts at Moscow, attempted to have Redi run the academy, but the latter did not accept the offer. Redi died in Florence.

Among his pupils were Giovanni Domenico Campiglia (1692–1768) and Giuseppe Grisoni (1700–1769).
