= Andrey Yefimovich Martynov =

Russian painter

- Born: July 2, 1768; Saint Petersburg
- Died: November 1, 1826 (aged 58); Rome
- Education: Member Academy of Arts (1795)
- Alma mater: Imperial Academy of Arts (1788)
- Known for: Painting

Andrey Yefimovich Martynov (Андрей Ефимович Мартынов; 1768–1826) was a painter and engraver from the Russian Empire. Member of the Imperial Academy of Arts.

== Biography ==
Born in St. Petersburg to the family of a sergeant in the Preobrazhensky Guards regiment, Martynov graduated from the Imperial Academy of Arts in 1788. In St. Petersburg Martynov studied landscape painting under Semion Shchedrin. From 1788 to 1794 he studied in Italy and painted the landscapes of Rome and its surroundings. These works for art were highly appreciated, by Martynov’s return to St. Petersburg. He was awarded the title of Academician in 1795. He worked on commissions from the Imperial court, and he participated in the decorating of several royal palaces and became a councilor of the Academy in 1802.

He travelled throughout southern Russia from 1804, primarily creating idealized watercolour of rural towns and landscapes. The beauty of the area around Lake Baikal especially captivated him, “it is surrounded by the Sayan Mountains, whose endless chain and picture-like diversity bring to the traveller’s gaze the infectious grandeur of nature”. His works of art is comparable to the present pair in its idealised panoramic vision of nature, with its vast expanses of water and sky. Like View of Irkutsk, Martynov’s Irkutsk, focuses more on the surrounding landscape than the city itself. These very Classical compositions are entirely devoted to the celebration of the beauty of nature. In 1805 he was the official artist of the Russian embassy to China by Earl A. Golovkin.

Martynov moved gradually away from painting into the newer media of etching and lithography, which he is primarily known for, because of his lithographic techniques. His series of lithographs of the lands and peoples of Mongolia (entitled "Views of Russia and Mongolia" and "Peoples Types of Russia and Mongolia") were greatly admired. A later set of lithographs, made while touring the Baltic regions ("Views of the Baltic Countries"), was similarly lauded in 1810.

Martynov died in Italy in 1826.

== Works ==
Andrey Martynov's works

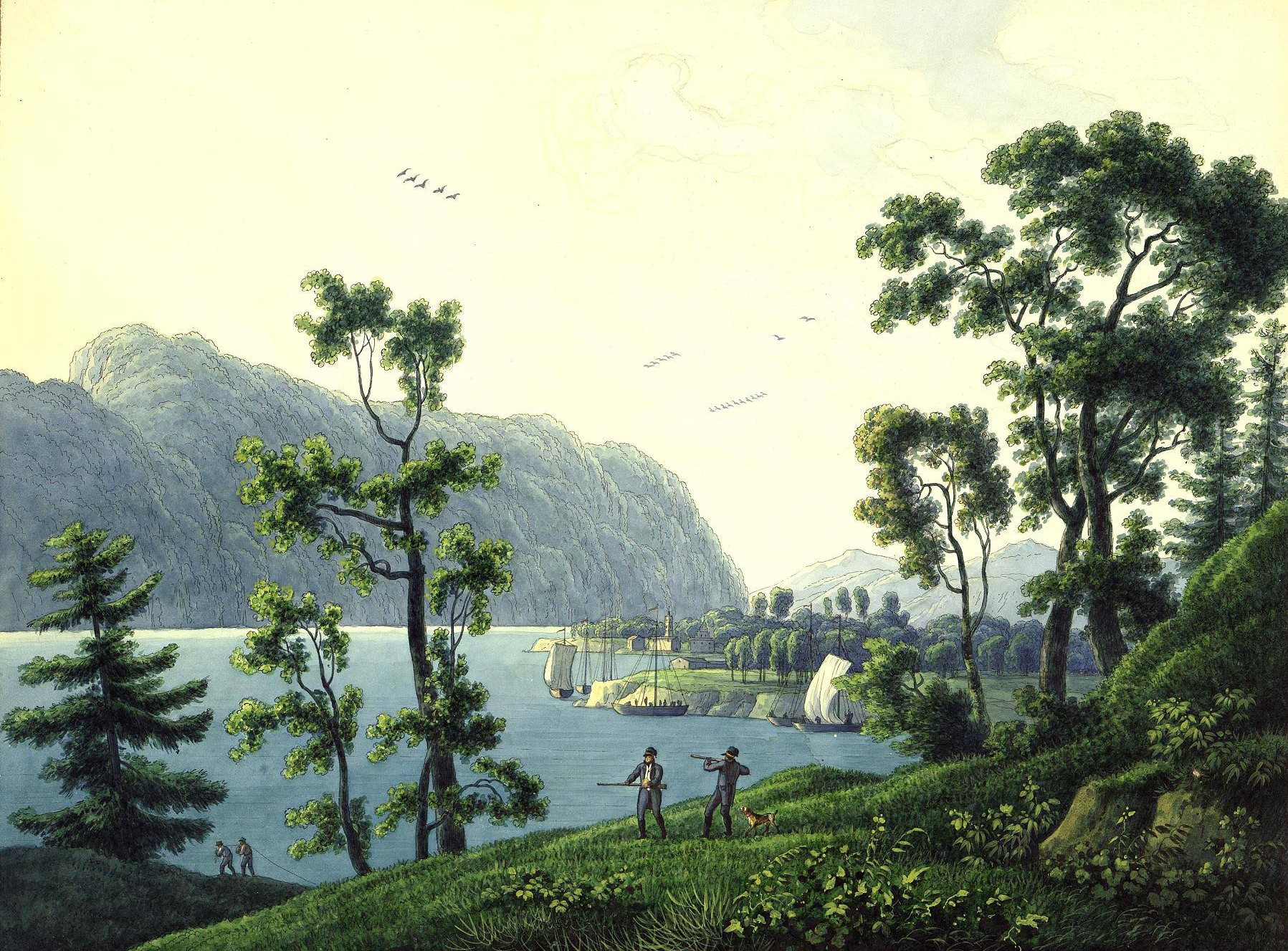
View of the Nikolsky Monastery on Lake Baikal (1806–1810)

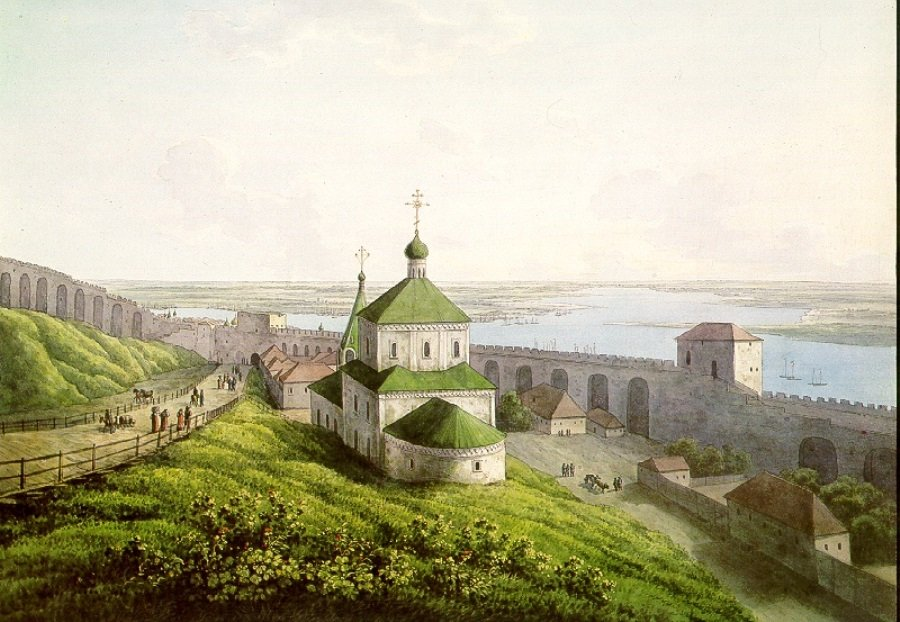
Church of St. Simeon Stylites.
Nizhny Novgorod Kremlin

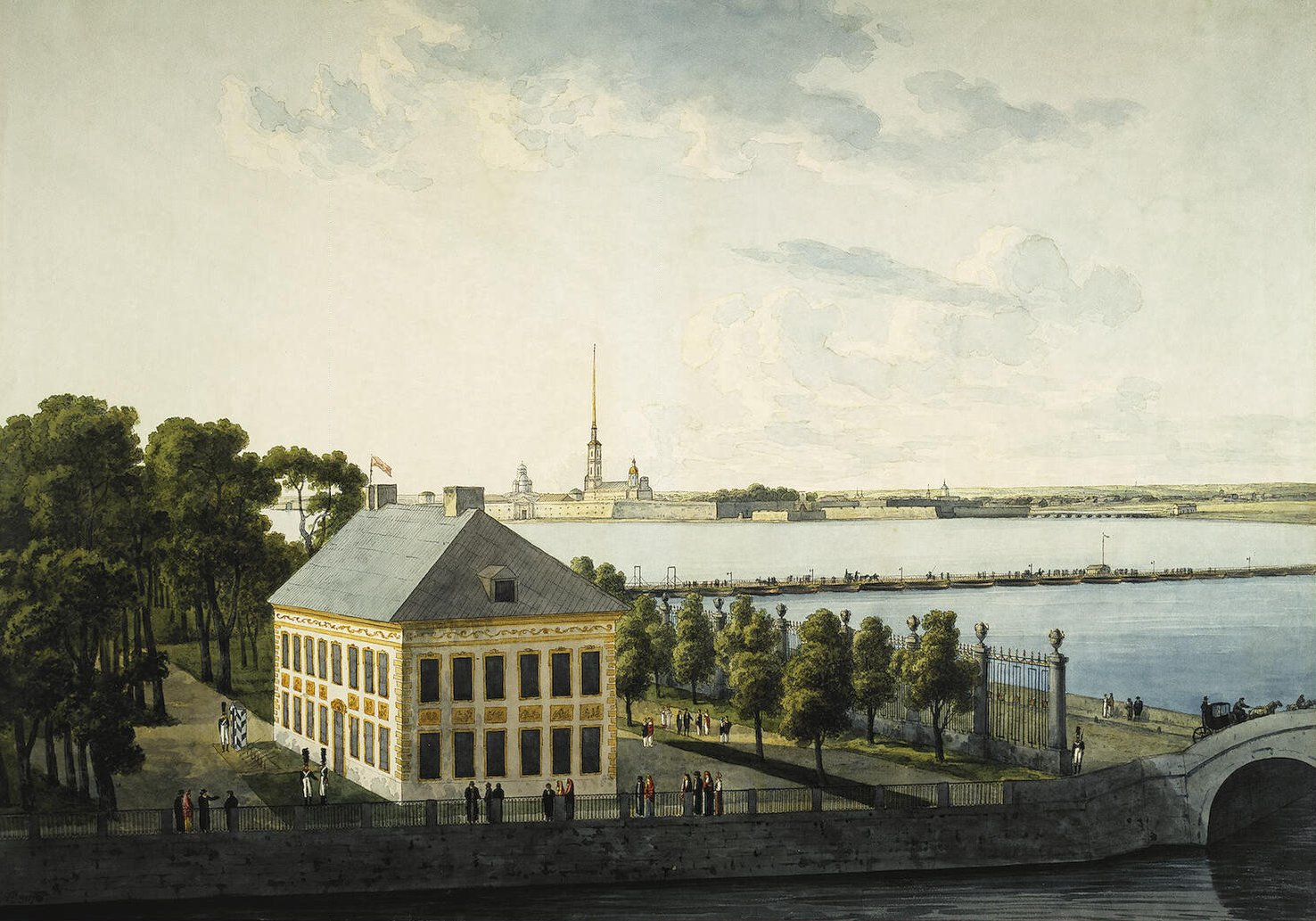
Summer Palace of Peter the Great

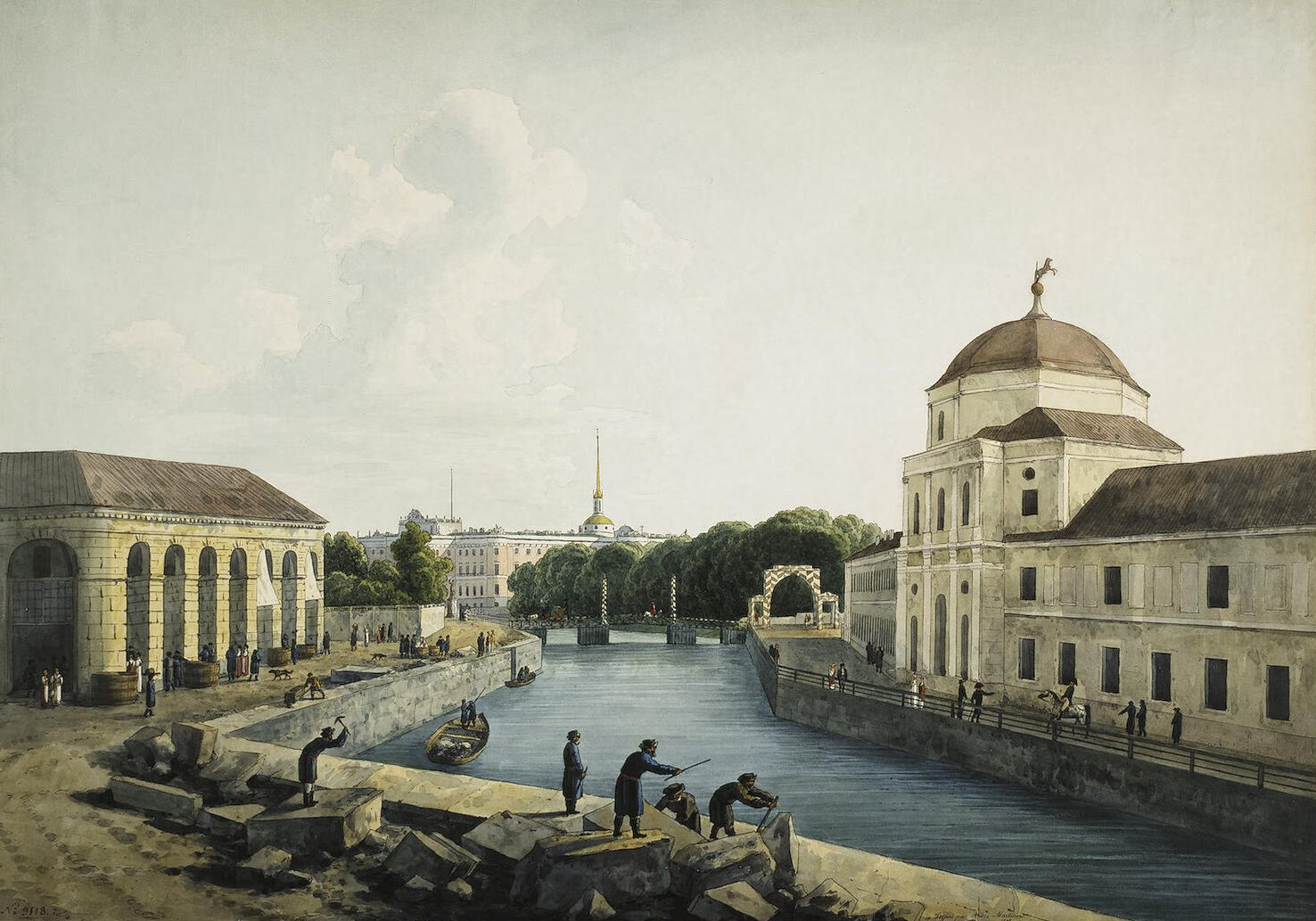
View of the Moyka River

== Literary sources ==
- С. Н. Кондаков (1915). Юбилейный справочник Императорской Академии художеств. 1764-1914 (in Russian). Vol. 2. p. 124.
