= Benjamin Duterrau =

English painter (1767–1851)

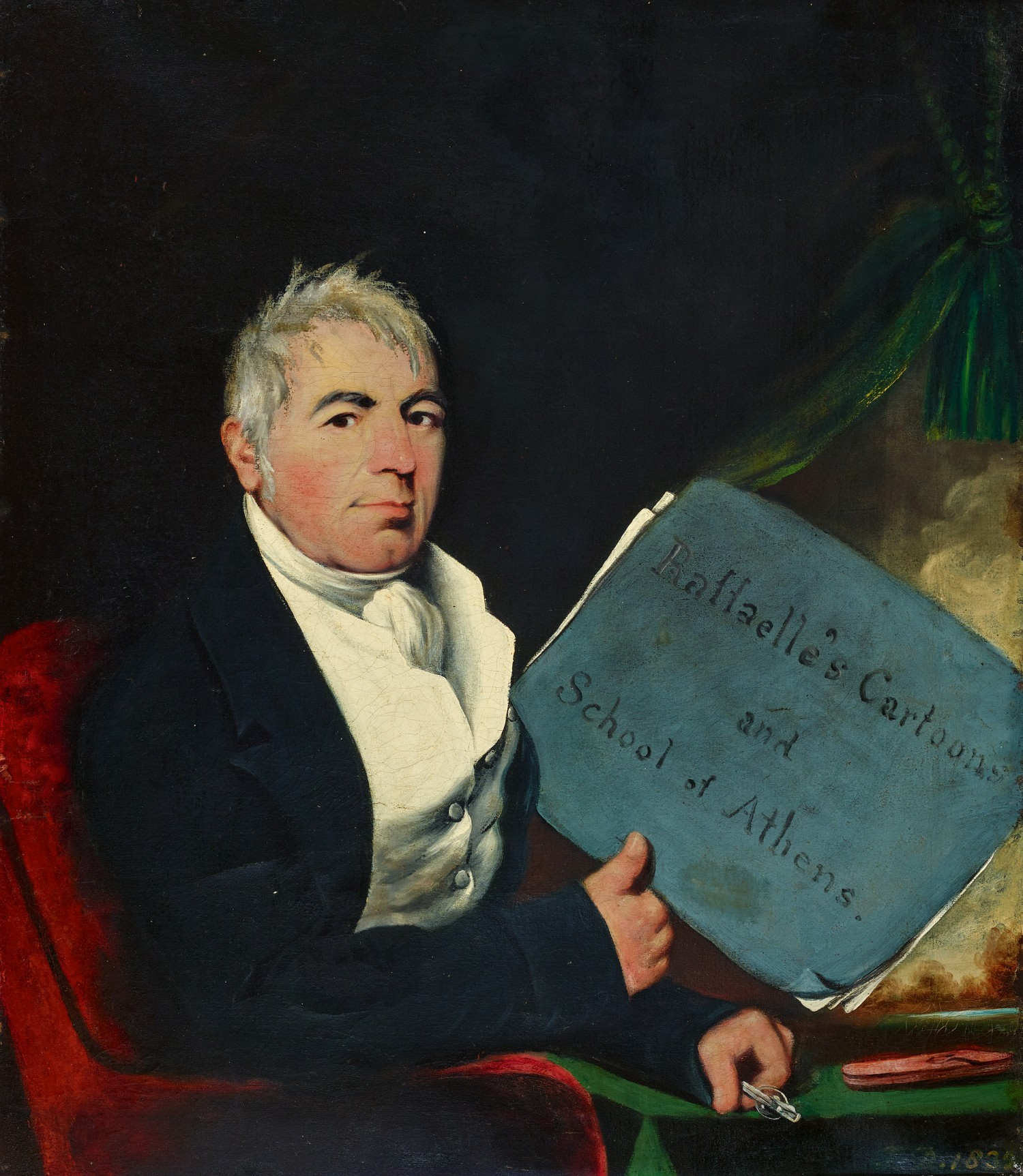
- Self-portrait, 1835
- Born: 17 March 1767; Soho, London, England
- Died: 11 July 1851 (aged 84); Hobart, Tasmania
- Occupations: Painter, sculptor and art lecturer
- Known for: Images of Indigenous people and Australian history paintings
- Children: 1

Benjamin Duterr[e]au (2 March 1767 – 11 July 1851) was an English painter, etcher, engraver, sculptor and art lecturer who emigrated to Tasmania. There he became known for his images of Indigenous people and Australian history paintings.

== Career ==
Duterrau was born in Soho in London, and was of Anglo-French descent. The parish record of Saint Anne, Soho, gives his baptism date as 24 March 1768, father 'Benjamin Dutterreau' and mother 'Sarah'. His father was a watchmaker. Duterrau was apprenticed to an engraver.

Duterrau emigrated to Van Diemen's Land (now Tasmania), arriving in August 1832 with his daughter. In 1833, at the Hobart Mechanics' Hall, he was the first man in the colony to give a lecture on art. In 1835 he did some etchings of Indigenous Australians. His most famous painting "The Conciliation" (1840) is in the Tasmanian Museum and Art Gallery in Hobart, which was intended to be a study for his "A National Picture", a 3.04m x 4.26m epic which has been long missing. Duterrau died at Hobart in 1851.

His daughter Jane (1812–1885) married John Bogle (1808–1879), a colonial merchant, in Hobart, Tasmania in February 1838, before returning to Britain. Their son Adam played for the Royal Engineers in the 1872 FA Cup Final.

Duterrau's gravestone lies in Hobart's Tasmanian Museum and Art Gallery, which erroneously names 'Bengamin Duterrau'. The spelling of Benjamin is the same in English and French but the sounds of the letters being spelled is different. Duterrau, though born in London, was the son of immigrant French parents whose first language would have been French and his education and language at home may well have been largely in French. This author suggests that the misspelling on his gravestone is the result of a spelling by either a French speaker to an English speaker or that Duterrau had always spelled his name to people in French alphabet where the English 'G' is pronounced 'jay' in French and 'J' as 'gee'.

== Interpretation of artwork ==
The significance and interpretation of Duterrau's painting has been debated. For example, although a minor artist, the Museum of Australian Democracy considers The Conciliation to be the first national epic painting and a foundation document for Australia. Intended to portray the end of the conflict in Van Diemen's land (Tasmania) between white settlers and First Nation people, the images are considered by Greg Lehman to be both ambivalent and ambiguous about the conciliation transaction and presages the betrayal of promises made to First Nation people by the Governor George Augustus Robinson. Lehman suggests that First Nation people's hesitancy in the painting reflects the artist's own unease about the future of Tasmanian First Nation people despite Duterrau's regard for Robinson. Duterrau made a number of studies of this scene and the final 1840 version now in the Tasmanian Museum and Art Gallery in Hobart provides a poignant insight into the future decimation of Tasmanian First Nation people. Lehman suggests this is depicted through the husband of Trucanini pointing to her shell necklace, a symbol of culture, that is being traded away.

== Gallery ==
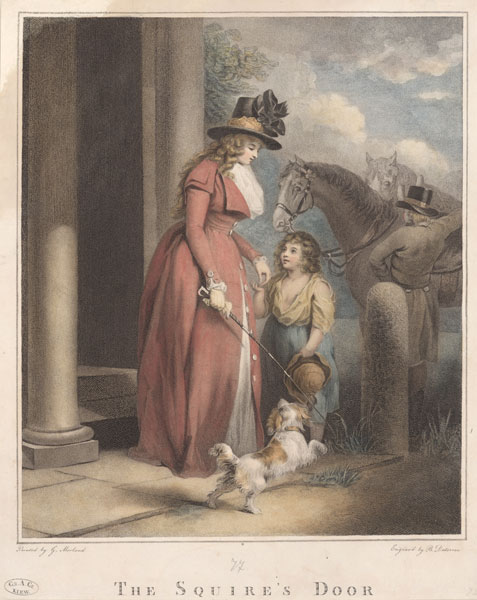
The squire's door (1790)

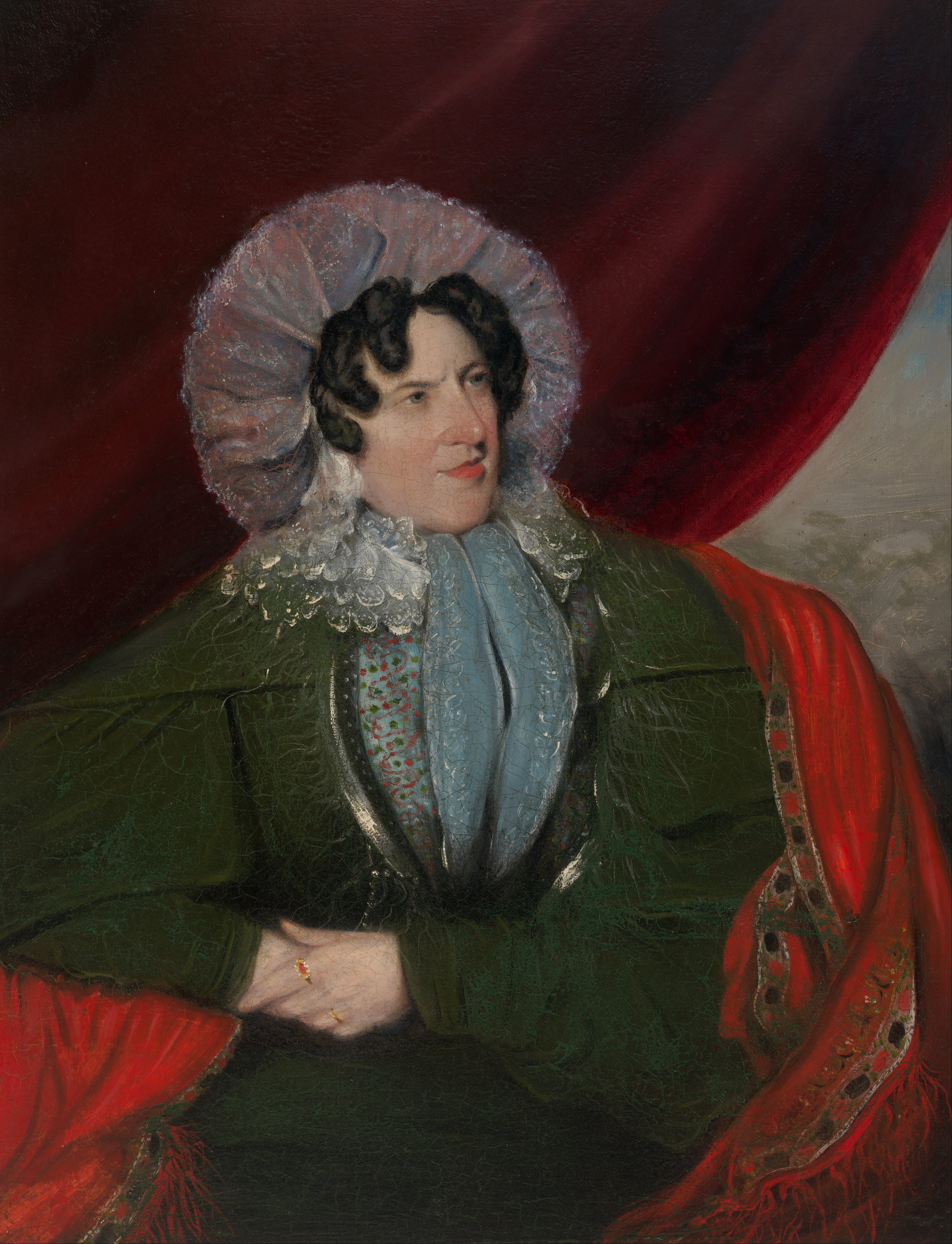
Edith, Mrs George Gatehouse (c. 1834)

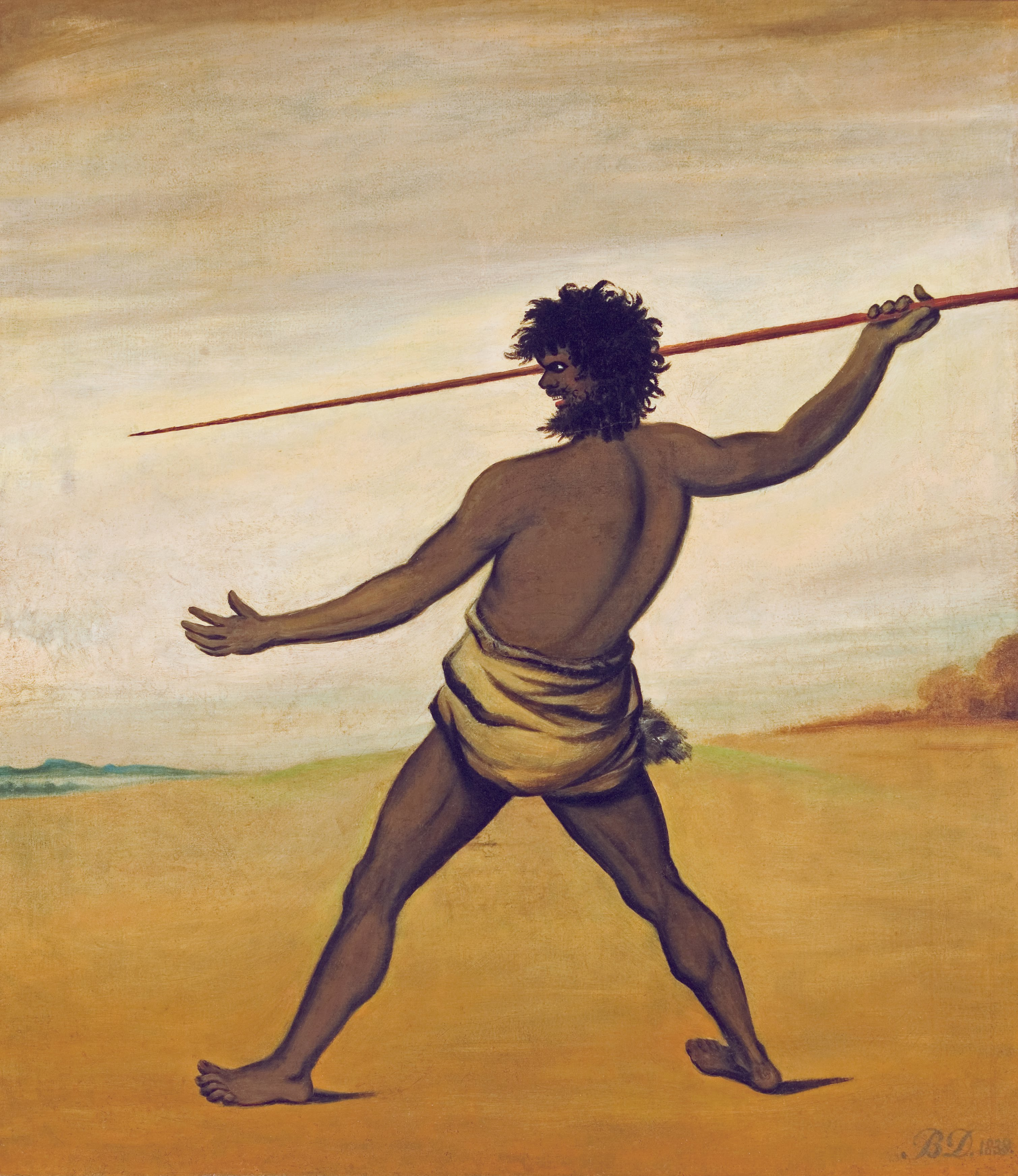
Timmy, a Tasmanian Aboriginal, throwing a spear (1838)

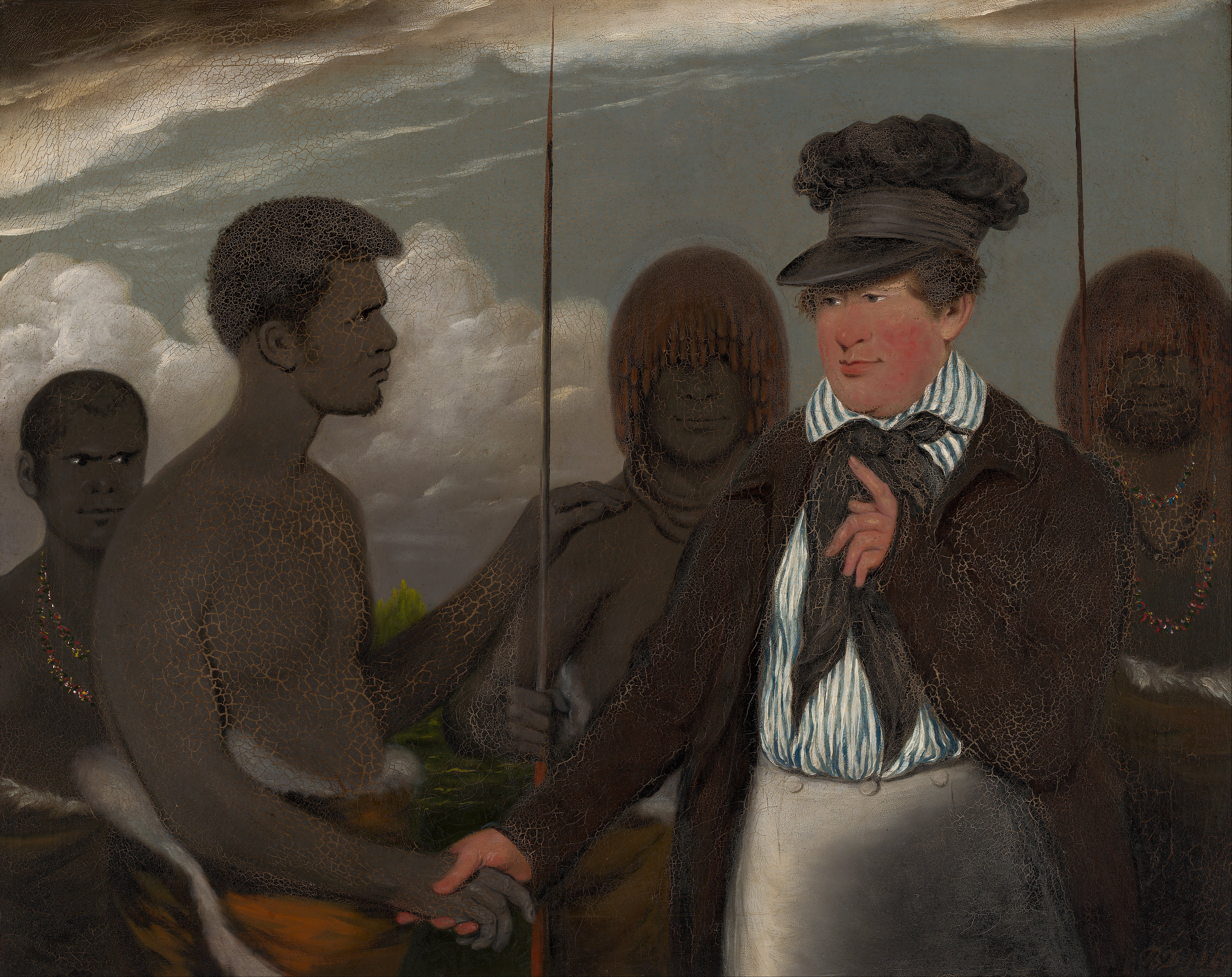
Mr Robinson's first interview with Timmy (1840)

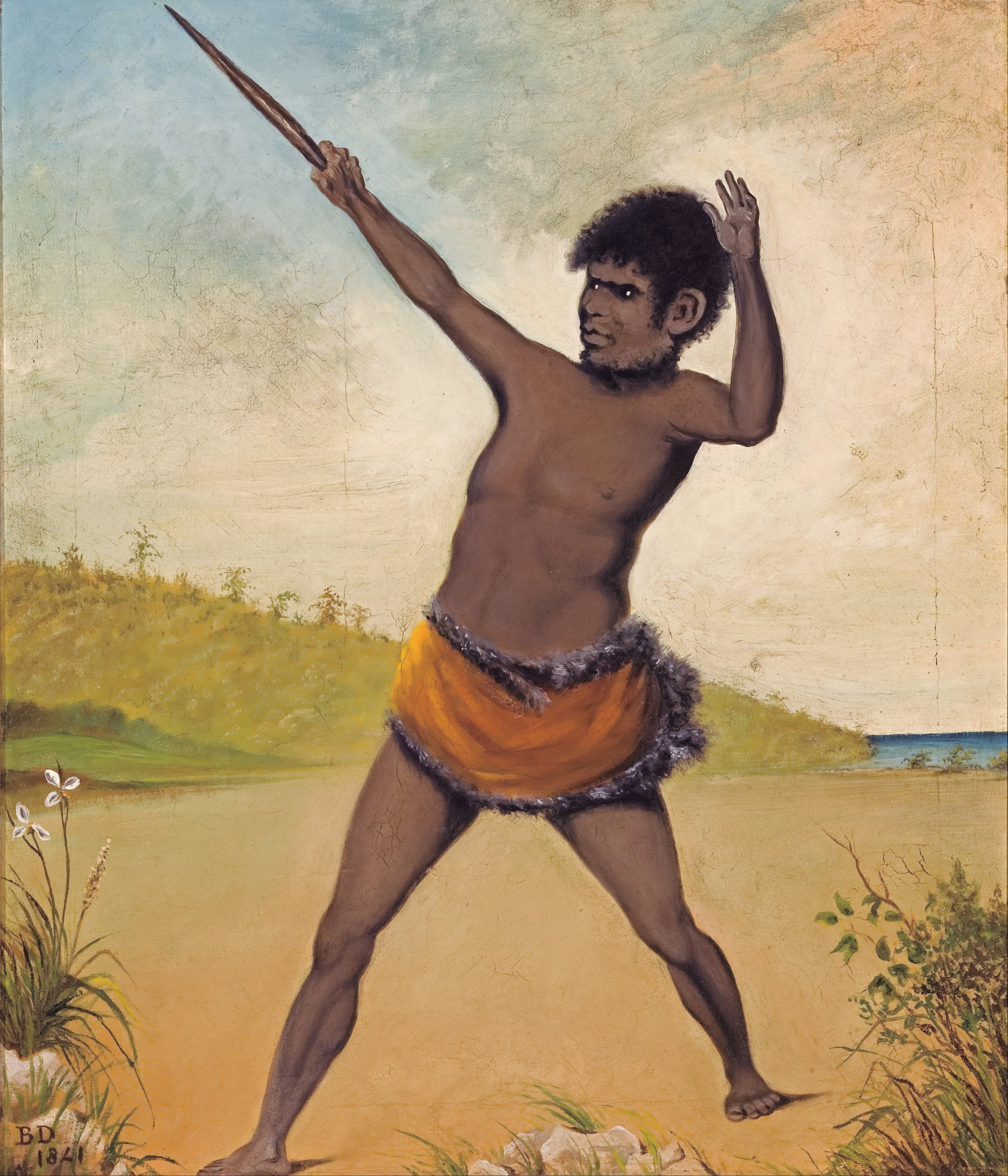
Jack, a Tasmanian Aboriginal, holding a club (1841)

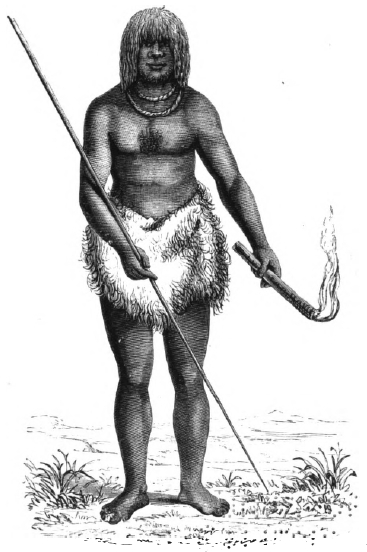
Manalagana

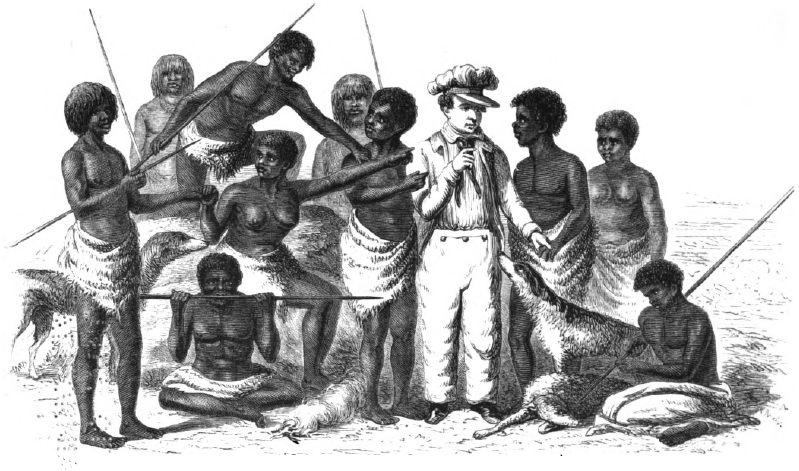
Mr Robinson on his conciliation mission
