= Vasily Rodchev =

Russian painter

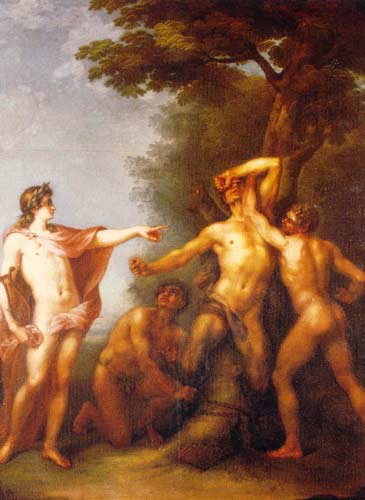
Painting by Vasily Yakovlevich Rodchev

Vasily Rodchev (1768–1803) was a Russian painter. The son of a carpenter, he was active primarily as a history painter, although at least one portrait by him is known. He studied at the Academy in Saint Petersburg, taking lessons from one P. Sokolov; in 1800 he received the title of Academician. In 1803, not long before his death, he was made a professor at the Academy.
