= General Johnson Saving a Wounded French Officer from the Tomahawk of a North American Indian =

Painting by Benjamin West

General Johnson Saving a Wounded French Officer
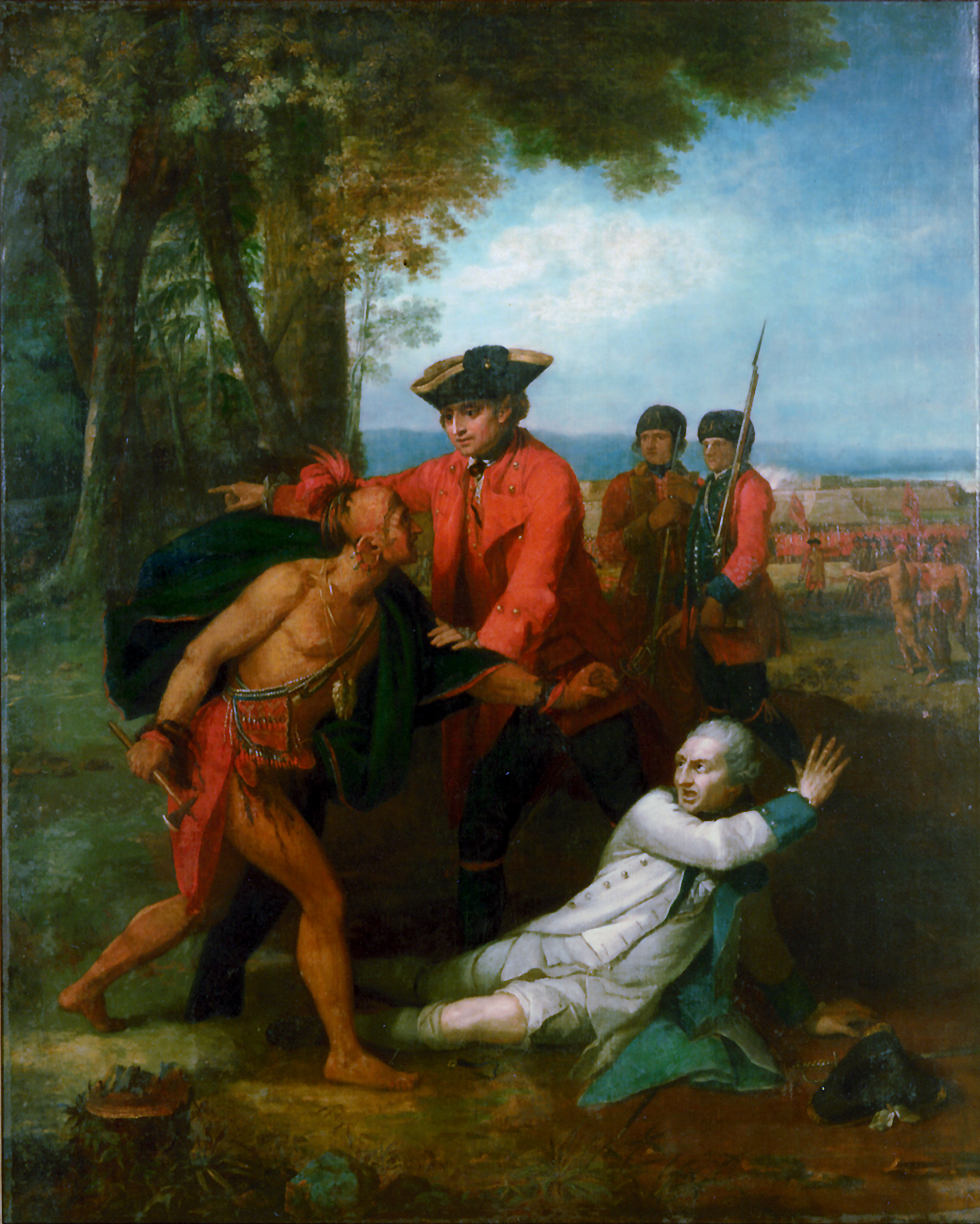
- Artist: Benjamin West
- Year: 1764–1768
- Medium: Oil on canvas
- Dimensions: 129.5 cm × 106.5 cm (51.0 in × 41.9 in)
- Location: Derby Museum and Art Gallery; Derby

General Johnson Saving a Wounded French Officer from the Tomahawk of a North American Indian is an oil painting on canvas by the British-American artist Benjamin West, completed between 1764 and 1768. It depicts a scene during the French and Indian War, and was painted a few years after the event depicted in the painting, and is now in the collection of Derby Museum and Art Gallery.

== Description ==
The painting is important as it is a contemporary view showing all three major groups involved during the French and Indian War (which could be called more comprehensively "the British, French and Indian War"). It depicts Irish soldier Sir William Johnson preventing an indigenous auxiliary from taking the scalp of Baron Dieskau, a wounded and defeated French soldier lying on the ground.

West was an early American painter. He claimed to have been first taught how to make paint by a Native American childhood friend who demonstrated how paint could be made by mixing clay with bear grease. The painting has fine detail on the indigenous figure, whose plucked scalp and tattoos are shown in more detail than the Europeans' uniforms. West is known to have had a collection of North American artefacts which he used in his paintings.

Benjamin West probably began this painting soon after his arrival in London, in 1763, when West returned from Italy, where he spent three years. Following The Indian Family, a painting of about 1761, this one demonstrates the same willingness to show "the proper dress and accoutrement". Thus it provides us with one of two known contemporary pictures of the British Light Infantrymen for the French and Indian War period. Whereas in the Italian painting, accuracy and authenticity were intended to give a generic representation of the Indian life, the new one employed them to make a report of a recent historical event.

Although the subject matter and some "physical and symbolic details" could be found more closely corresponding to the Battle of Fort Niagara (1759), the painting is usually related to an incident that occurred during the campaign of 1755 around Lake George, when the French commanded by Baron Dieskau, with their Indian allies, were opposed by a mixed troop of Mohawk and New England militia, led by Johnson. After having repulsed an attack against their camp, the British and their auxiliaries took over. Dieskau, wounded three times, had his life saved by Johnson, who protected him from the Mohawks wanting revenge for their killed kinsmen. He actually survived and was taken as a prisoner to New York, then to London, and then to Bath for treatment of a still unhealed wound. At the end of the Seven Years' War in 1763, he was repatriated to France, where he died in 1767.

West returned to the American war in his The Death of General Wolfe, exhibited in 1771, a much larger work that made his reputation, though causing controversy through its use of contemporary costume.

== Historical context ==
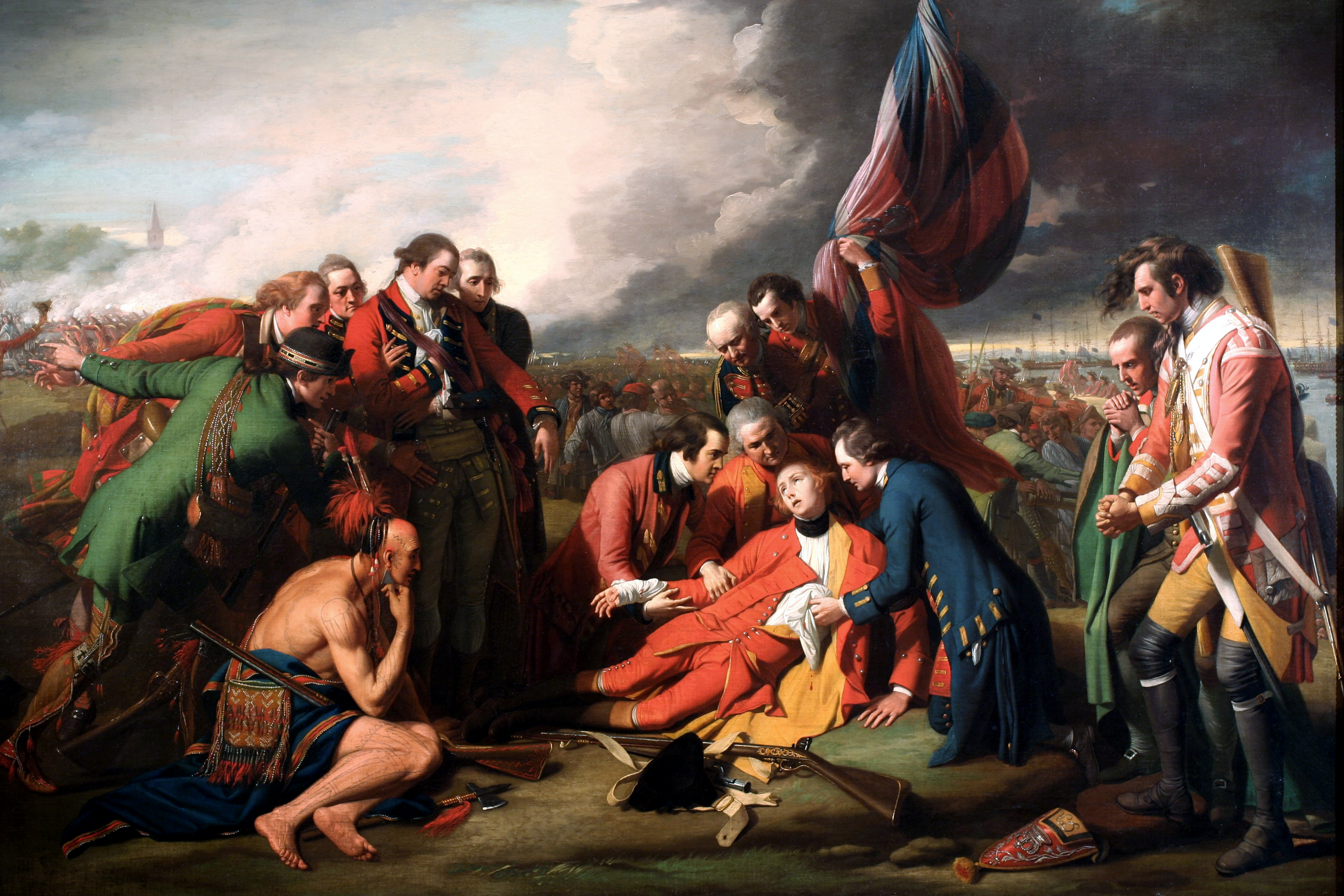
West's The Death of General Wolfe, 1770

By showing the European Johnson restraining the aggressive actions of an indigenous auxiliary, the painting has been identified by some art historians as promoting European standards of honor and laws of war, in contrast to the traditional "warlike" values of indigenous warriors such as scalping and killing prisoners of war. It has also been identified as referring to the concerns and debates that the employment of Indian allies aroused among Europeans, throughout the numerous conflicts in North America. Johnson's actions in the painting contrasts against Johnson's historical reputation which has included him being described as a "White Savage" for his positive outlook on indigenous traditions during times of conflict.

At the beginning of the French and Indian War, a young George Washington is said to have allowed Indian chief Tanaghrisson seal their fresh alliance by smashing the skull of Joseph Coulon de Jumonville, a wounded French officer they just took as prisoner, then washing his hands in the man's brain. The Jumonville affair caused a scandal in Europe, where it accelerated the outbreak of the Seven Years' War.

The same questions persisted during the American War of Independence. In 1777, both Houses of the British Parliament debated over the employment of Indian auxiliaries. The Earl of Chatham's speech in the House of Lords made November 20, which advocated against the employment of Indian allies against the American Patriots on the grounds that they would target non-combatant colonists and cannibalise them, was indicative of opposition to long-standing recruiting traditions in Europe.
