= Giovanni Domenico Campiglia =

Italian painter

Self-portrait, c. 1738, London, British Museum

Giovanni Domenico Campiglia (1692–1768) was an Italian painter and engraver from Florence, active under the patronage of the House of Medici.

He initially trained under Tommaso Redi and Lorenzo del Moro, then in Bologna under Giovanni Gioseffo dal Sole. During his career, Campiglia was employed in Rome and Florence, painting and engraving historical subjects and portraits. Campiglia worked with Antonio Francesco Gori for over a decade on the Museum Florentinum, a collection of images of all the famous artists of Florence. Campiglia's contributions were published in 1734, which induced Pope Clement XII to bring him to Rome. There he worked with historian Giovanni Gaetano Bottari in engravings for his multi-volume Musei Capitolini. His highly finished drawings of antique and famous statues of Rome were highly prized by British tourists.

== Sources ==
- National Gallery of Scotland, Biography of Campiglia.
- Boni, Filippo de' (1852). Biografia degli artisti ovvero dizionario della vita e delle opere dei pittori, degli scultori, degli intagliatori, dei tipografi e dei musici di ogni nazione che fiorirono da'tempi più remoti sino á nostri giorni. Seconda Edizione.. Venice; Googlebooks: Presso Andrea Santini e Figlio. p. 176.
- https://accademiasanluca.it/accademici/archivio/campiglia
