= Antonio Baldi (painter) =

Italian painter and engraver

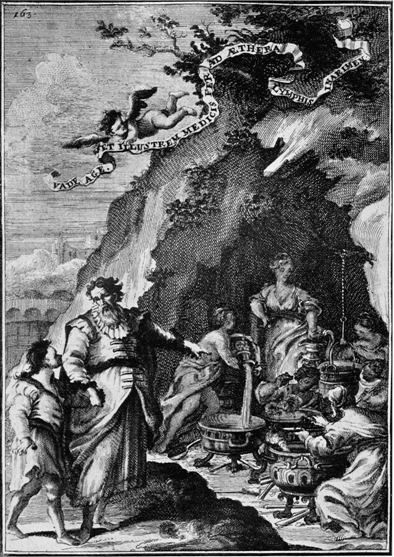
Podalirius Leads the Young Nymphs Preparing the Hot Springs by Antonio Baldi, 1726

Antonio Baldi (c. 1692 – 1768) was an Italian painter and engraver of the late-Baroque period. He was born at Cava de' Tirreni in the kingdom of Naples. After training under Solimena, he became a pupil of Andreas Magliar and studied the art of engraving. He chiefly resided at Naples, where he occasionally worked as a scenic designer in collaboration with Vincenzo Re. He died in Naples in 1768.

== Notes ==
- Bryan, Michael (1886). Robert Edmund Graves (ed.). Dictionary of Painters and Engravers, Biographical and Critical. Vol. I: A-K. London: George Bell and Sons. p. 71.
