= Raid on Fort Schlosser =

Military action during the War of 1812

Coordinates: 43°4′39.14″N 79°00′56.02″W

- Part of War of 1812
Date	July 5, 1813
Location	Fort Schlosser, New York
Result	Anglo-Canadian victory

Belligerents
United Kingdom; Upper Canada	United States

Commanders and leaders
James Fitzgibbon; Thomas Clark	Unknown

Strength
34 Canadian militia 7 British regulars	11 men

Casualties and losses
None	11 captured

On July 5, 1813, 34 Canadian militia and 7 British regulars from the 49th Regiment of Foot crossed the Niagara River and raided Fort Schlosser. They took the American garrison of 11 by surprise and captured them along with all the arms and stores.

== Background ==
On May 27, 1813 American forces invaded Upper Canada at the Battle of Fort George. They advanced along the Niagara Peninsula but were turned back at the Battle of Stoney Creek. A loose siege ensued at Fort George and the invasion of Niagara halted. Many small skirmishes and raids happened in the deadlock including The Battle of Ball's Farm, the Raid on Black Rock, and the Raid on Fort Schlosser.

== Action ==
During the night of July 4, Lieutenant Colonel Thomas Clark of the 2nd Lincoln Militia gathered 34 Canadians from the Lincoln Militia and met up with Lieutenant James Fitzgibbon with 6 other men from the British 49th Regiment of Foot. By the time the sun was rising the British and Canadians were crossing the Niagara River in three boats. They were able to take the American garrison by surprise capturing all of them without a fight.

== Aftermath ==
The British captured a six-pound brass canon, 57 muskets, one and a half kegs of musket balls, three boats, 20 barrels of salt, eight kegs of tobacco, and 16 tons of cannon shot. The attackers left after one hour. while in the process of leaving 15 American militia showed up on the beach and fired at the British and Canadians. No casualties were inflicted.

== Sources ==
- Cruikshank, Earnst (1902). The Documentary History of the Campaign Upon the Niagara Frontier in the Year 1813. Welland Ontario: Lundys Lane Historical Society.
- Hannings, Bud (2012). The War of 1812: A Complete Chronology with biographies of 63 General Officers. McFarland and Company Inc. ISBN 9780786463855.
