= Samuel Street Jr. =

Upper Canada businessman

Samuel Street, also known as Samuel Street Jr, (March 14, 1775 – August 21, 1844) was a Canadian businessman and government official in Upper Canada who became one of the richest men in Upper Canada. Born in Farmington, Connecticut, he moved to Chippawa, Upper Canada, after his father was murdered. In Chippawa he lived with his uncle, Samuel Street, who introduced him to the local business community. In the early 1800s, he entered into various partnerships with other businessmen and purchased mills in the Niagara region. His most prominent partnership was with Thomas Clark, and together they used the profits from the mills to lend money (and charge interest) to various people in Upper Canada, further increasing their wealth. They also purchased property throughout Upper Canada, employing agents to help with the purchases, and lending money to local officials in exchange for notification of property that was to be cheaply sold. He bought shares in banks and transportation companies and held debentures with the Upper Canadian government and regional governments. He was a prominent member of the Niagara business elite and was hired to be an executor for other prominent members. He was also a military commander of the 3rd Lincoln Militia, become a colonel of the militia in 1839. He died in Port Robinson, Upper Canada, and his estate was given to his son, Thomas Clark Street, and four daughters.

== Early life and family ==
Street was born in Farmington, Connecticut on March 14, 1775. He was the eldest son of Nehemiah Street and Thankful Moody. His father was murdered in Cold Spring, New York, and in 1787 Samuel Street moved to Chippawa, Upper Canada, to live with his uncle Samuel Street. Street Jr was introduced to the mercantile community in the Niagara region by his uncle and worked in his uncle's shipping business. In October 1796, Street Jr was granted 600 acres by the British government because he was the son of a loyalist. That year he also became a magistrate and he was also the deputy-registrar for the Niagara region. By 1801 he was also the deputy lieutenant of the militia in Lincoln county. He insisted that religious sects who paid a fine rather than join the militia, such as Quakers, Mennonites, and members of the Old German Baptist Brethren, attend the militia's musters with proof of their fine payment. He threatened to arrest and prosecute those who did not attend the muster.

== Business career ==
=== Early career and milling operations ===
The first records of Street's business activities are from 1797, when he received a shipment of goods. He formed a partnership with Thomas Clark in May 1798, but the partnership ended the following year. By 1803 Street was part of the milling business at Niagara Falls and in August he became a clerk for Bridgewater Mills in Chippawa, a milling complex. In 1804 he entered into a partnership with James Durand and in 1807 he purchased a milling complex named Falls Mills from Clark.

In 1808 or 1809, Street entered a new partnership with Clark to run Falls Mills, a milling complex. In 1810 the two businessmen bought Bridgewater Mills. Robert Randal contested Street's ownership over Bridgewater Mills because he claimed the process in which its previous owner, Durand, obtained the property from Randal several years prior was improper. This caused a lengthy legal battle over the status of the property and Randal highlighted this event in his opposition to the Niagara region's elite, which included Street. The two gristmills processed wheat, which were produced on farms in the region. The mills were described by James Crooks, another businessman and political figure, as having a monopoly in the region, while George Prevost, an army officer in the War of 1812, described the mills as the "most useful and valuable in the country".

In September 1812 Street became captain of the 3rd Lincoln Militia. Several of his mills were destroyed by the Americans during the War of 1812 in July 1814. Street and Clark applied for compensation for this event, but the compensation for Brigewater Mills was delayed until 1835 by the legal dispute initiated by Randal. They claimed that the property destruction was worth £7,785, but were given £4,970. Falls Mills was rebuilt and turned into a woolen mill, while Bridewater Mills was never rebuilt. In 1822, Street was promoted to be the lieutenant-colonel of the 3rd Lincoln Militia.

=== Later career ===
Street used the profits from the mills to become a moneylender, further increasing his profits. He did not discriminate on who he lent money to, giving various amounts to farmers, politicians, and clergy. He was very strict with borrowers who submitted late payments, although granted leniency to the clergy elite. He became the second-largest shareholder of the Bank of Upper Canada in 1830 and possibly the largest shareholder of the Gore Bank; he also held shares in the Bank of Montreal and the Commercial Bank of the Midland District. He acquired shares in the Welland Canal Company, Erie and Ontario Railroad Company, various road projects, and other transportation companies. He also owned debentures issued by the Upper Canadian government, the Gore district, and the Wellington District.

Street was also a land speculator and bought property in almost every region of the province. He acquired this land via foreclosures on loans and sales of land to recover unpaid taxes from farmers. He was well connected with local officials in various regions and lent them money for public work projects in exchange for preferential treatment on purchasing property. Local officials would also notify him when land was to be sold at cheaper rates due to a sheriff's sale. He employed agents throughout the province who would administer and purchase property for him. He vigorously defended himself in legal disputes by consulting people holding important legal or political positions and paying witnesses to attend court proceedings.

In the 1830s Street and Clark build a wooden walkway around their property at The Burning Springs in the Niagara region. The spring was a natural gas spring and Street would charge tourists to see the spring be lit. Other citizens in the Niagara region would hire Street to act as their agent concerning business concerns. He was an executor for prominent people in Niagara to settle estates and disperse land. In 1839 he was promoted to colonel in the 3rd Lincoln Militia.

In 1841, Street purchased shares in the Welland Canal Company, which were exchanged for debentures issued by the Upper Canadian government. William Hamilton Merritt assisted Street in purchasing the stocks at a lower price because Merritt had close relationships with the owners of the canal. Merritt also informed Street of a bill in the Upper Canadian legislature that, if passed, would further increase the value of the canal's stocks. Street purchased as much stock in the company as he could, but died before he could profit from the exchange.

== Personal life and death ==
Street married Abigail Hyde Ransom on September 5, 1811. They had a son, businessman and political figure Thomas Clark Street, and five daughters. Street suffered from health problems for most of his life, possibly due to arthritis. This prevented him from travelling outside of the Niagara region for business reasons, so those responsibilities were given to Clark, his partner.

Street died at Port Robinson, Upper Canada, on August 21, 1844. His estate and land holdings were given to his son, and his four living daughters, and totalled 15,680 acres in Upper Canada. At his death, he was one of the wealthiest men in Upper Canada. Upon his death, Street was negatively described in a local newspaper called the St. Catharines Journal as a businessman who ensured he received the total amount owed to him in interest when he lent money to others.
