= Captain Runchey's Company of Coloured Men =

Canadian militia company

Runchey's Company of Coloured Men Canadian Provincial Corps of Artificers
- Active: July 1812 – 24 March 1815
- Country: Upper Canada
- Allegiance: United Kingdom
- Branch: Upper Canadian Militia (auxiliary troops)
- Type: Infantry, artificers
- Role: Military engineering
- Size: Company
- Engagements: War of 1812: Battle of Queenston Heights; Battle of Fort George; Siege of Fort Erie

Commanders
- Notable commanders: Capt. Robert Runchey 1812; Lt. James Cooper 1812–1813; Lt. James Robertson 1813–1815?

Captain Runchey's Company of Coloured Men was a Canadian militia company of free blacks and indentured black servants, raised in Upper Canada as a small Black corps under a White officer, Robert Reuben Runchey (1759–1819), a tavern keeper from Jordan, Upper Canada. The unit fought in several actions during the early part of the Anglo-American War of 1812. In 1813, Runchey's Company was converted into a unit of the Canadian Corps of Provincial Artificers, attached to the Royal Sappers and Miners, in which sappers and miners performed specialized military operations. They served on the Niagara River front during the war, and were disbanded a few months after the war ended. The Company of Coloured Men's military heritage is perpetuated in the modern Canadian Army by the Lincoln and Welland Regiment.

== Origin ==
The company was formed at the instigation of a black settler in Upper Canada, Richard Pierpoint, who had served as part of Butler's Rangers during the American Revolutionary War. On the outbreak of the War of 1812, he petitioned Major-General Isaac Brock, commanding the British Forces in Upper Canada, to form a militia corps from black settlers in the Niagara Peninsula.

Brock initially turned down Pierpoint's request as it was considered unnecessary. However, by July, Brock was desperate for volunteer troops, who at that point were not coming forward from among the white population, causing him to reconsider the offer. He set in motion the very plan that Pierpoint had suggested a month before. In August 1812, Captain Robert Runchey, a tavern owner in Lincoln and formerly an officer in the 2nd Flank Company of the 1st Lincoln Regiment of Militia, was assigned to form the militia corps that Pierpoint had proposed. The loss to the Lincoln Militia of Robert Runchey was not considered a great blow as he was held in low esteem by fellow officers. Referring to Runchey, Lieutenant-Colonel Ralph Clench of the 1st Lincoln called him a "black sheep in our Regiment, and with whom the Officers I believe would gladly part". Runchey's son George, who was formerly a sergeant in the 1st Lincoln, would become the Coloured Corps' Lieutenant.

Men volunteered very quickly. The number who came forward varies depending on the source: 76, 50, about 35 or more than 30. Other men transferred from other units, such as 14 men including a Sergeant William Thompson, from the 3rd York Militia in October.

Pierpoint himself signed up as a private even though he was 68 years old at the time. It also may have been that Pierpoint expected that such a unit as the Coloured Corps would help facilitate greater military responsibility and opportunities for blacks. However, black settlers would never be commissioned, and would rise at most to be non-commissioned officers (sergeants and corporals).

== Early service ==
The Coloured Corps saw action in some of best-known battles of the War of 1812. At the Battle of Queenston Heights, they participated in the recapture of the Redan Battery after the death of Major-General Brock. They were placed to the left of the main body of troops (consisting of the 41st and 49th Regiments of Foot) and to the right of John Norton's Grand River Warriors, a positioning that suggests that the Coloured Corps was considered to be light infantry. Light infantry troops were much more mobile and given more freedom in terms of selecting targets, often targeting officers as a way of creating as much havoc among the enemy as possible. The Coloured Corps suffered no casualties in the battle although the 1st Lincoln Militia (of which the Coloured Corps was part) did suffer one man killed and two wounded.

== Transformation into Artificers ==
1813 brought many changes for the Coloured Corps. On 3 March 1813, the unit was converted into the Corps of Provincial Artificers under the command of Lieutenant James Robertson, a black settler formerly of Detroit who, like Pierpoint, had been a member of Butler's Rangers in the Revolutionary War, as well as the Corps of Provincial Artificers before joining the Coloured Corps sometime before the Battle of Queenston Heights. While this might have appeared to be a backward step, the scarcity of the sundry skills required of Artificers meant that they were paid two to four times as much as they would have been as private soldiers. In their new capacity, they were charged with constructing a battery on Mississauga Point to interfere with American ships resupplying Fort Niagara, a task impossible to accomplish from Fort George. (This was not the first time this spot had been used to harass Fort Niagara. The British had set up a six-gun emplacement in 1759 when Fort Niagara was occupied by the French.) Probably working under the cover of darkness because the site was exposed to the guns of Fort Niagara, the Corps constructed a single-gun battery.

The unit nevertheless served as infantry during the Battle of Fort George, where they suffered a number of losses. Together with 100 men of the 1st Lincoln Militia, a company of the Royal Newfoundland Fencibles and two companies of the Glengarry Light Infantry, the (then) 27 men of the unit attempted to repulse the initial American landing at the mouth of Two Mile Creek (43.257913°N 79.103408°W) near the property of James Crooks. Under fire from American gunboats (which included USS Scourge built by Crooks and his brother William two years earlier as the trading schooner Lord Nelson), the defenders put up a stiff defence for some 15 minutes, the two sides firing at each other from as little as 20 feet (6.1 m) before the superior numbers of attackers made a British withdrawal inevitable.

The unit lost one man (James Walker) wounded, one man (Anthony Hutts, or Hults or Hull) taken prisoner, who was later reported to have died in captivity, and two men (Abraham Sloane and William Spencer) reported to have "deserted to the enemy". However, given that slavery was still legal in the United States at this point, deserting to the enemy seems a most unlikely choice for the men of the Coloured Corps. The body of a black soldier was reported by an American officer and identified by his green uniform as being a member of the Glengarry Light Infantry, although it is possible that this was in fact the body of either Sloane or Spencer.

The Coloured Corps retreated with the rest of the army commanded by Brigadier-General John Vincent along the Iroquois Trail to Head of the Lake by way of Queenston, Beaver Dams, DeCew House, the Forty and Stoney Creek before setting up camp at Burlington Heights four days later. Although the unit did not participate in the night action at Stoney Creek, it had proved its worth as a fighting force and was retained as a force where other sedentary militia unit were not encouraged to retreat along with Vincent's army. Muster rolls show that the unit returned to the Niagara area to participate in the siege of Fort George, mustering 26 rank and file in St. Davids after Major-General De Rottenburg moved his headquarters there once the immediate threat from the U.S. attack on Fort George had passed. Although the unit was not listed separately in official reports, it may nevertheless have been engaged in action as smaller units were often combined under one heading. On 16 June 1813, three members of the Coloured Corps are listed as casualties in an action on that day (probably at Sugar Loaf near present-day Port Colborne) when Buffalo surgeon-turned-raider Major Cyrenius Chapin led his force of irregular New York Mounted Militia on a raid to interfere with British lines. The three are again listed as having deserted but given the improvement in British fortunes since the debacle at Fort George, this seems even less likely and it is more probable that the captured men were taken back into a captive life.

The unit was present at several engagements on the Niagara Peninsula later in 1813 and in 1814.

== Uniform ==
Like most units of Upper Canadian militia, Captain Runchey's Company wore ordinary civilian clothes with a white armband to show their allegiance and service. When the unit was transferred to the Provincial Corps of Artificers, the provincial government of Upper Canada became responsible for their clothing and supply. The Corps adopted a uniform consisting of a dark blue tailless jacket with black facings, grey pantaloons and a black round hat.

In 1814, they received uniforms directly from Britain, and wore the same uniform as the Royal Sappers and Miners.

== Notable members ==
- Lt. James Cooper – unit commander succeeding Runchey
- Lt. James Robertson – unit commander succeeding Cooper
- Lt. George Runchey – son of Runchey

== See also ==
- Canadian units of the War of 1812
- Lincoln Militia
- Victoria Rifles (Nova Scotia)
- No. 2 Construction Battalion
- The Lincoln and Welland Regiment

== Sources ==
- Chartrand, Rene; Embleton, Gerry (1998). British Forces in North America 1793–1815. Osprey. ISBN 1-85532-741-4.
- Elliott, James E. (2009). Strange Fatality: The Battle of Stoney Creek, 1813. Toronto: Robin Brass Studio. ISBN 978-1-896941-58-5.
- Green, Ernest (1931). "Upper Canada's Black Defenders". Ontario History. 27. Ontario Historical Society: 365–391.
- Malcomson, Robert (2003). A Very Brilliant Affair: The Battle of Queenston Heights, 1812. Toronto: Robin Brass Studio. ISBN 1-896941-33-8.
- Meyler, David and Peter (1999). A Stolen Life: Searching for Richard Pierpoint. Toronto: Natural heritage Books. ISBN 1-896219-55-1.
- Pitt, Steve (2008). To Stand and Fight Together: Richard Pierpoint and the Coloured Corps of Upper Canada. Toronto: Dundurn Press. ISBN 978-1-55002-731-0.
