= Canadian League =

Canadian League or League of Canada may refer to:

== Sports ==
=== Baseball ===
- Canadian Baseball League, a current independent league
- Canadian Baseball League (2003), a former independent league
- Canadian League (Class D), a former minor league (1885–1899; 1905; 1911–1915)

=== Lacrosse ===
- Canadian Lacrosse League (2016), a current junior lacrosse league
- Canadian Lacrosse League (2011), a former semi-professional league

=== Soccer ===
- Canadian Premier League, a current Division I league
- Canadian Soccer League, an unsanctioned league
- Canadian Soccer League (1987–1992), a former Division I league

=== Other ===
- Canadian Basketball League, a former basketball league
- Canadian Football League, a Canadian football league
- Canadian Floorball League, a floorball league
- Canadian Hockey League, a major junior ice hockey league

== Organizations ==
- Canadian Defence League, a pre-World War I military service advocacy group
- Canadian League of Composers, a Canadian music advocacy group
- Canadian League of Rights, a 20th century far-right political organization
- Canadian Radio League, a 1930s pro-public broadcasting lobbyist group
- Navy League of Canada, a non-governmental youth organization affiliated with the Department of National Defence
- Monarchist League of Canada, a monarchist advocacy group
