= Robert Randal =

American-Canadian politician and businessman

Robert Randal (c. 1766 – May 2, 1834) was a businessman and political figure in Upper Canada and the United States. He was born in the United States and convicted of attempting to bribe members of the United States Congress in order to buy the lower Michigan peninsula. He bought mills and acres of land in Upper Canada. However, his businesses were unsuccessful and sold to British creditors. He was arrested in Montreal and he was sued for unpaid debts. He hired G. D'Arcy Boulton as his lawyer to protect his properties, but the delay in court proceedings put him in debt with the lawyers, causing more of his properties to be sold to pay his debts.

Randal was elected to the Legislative Assembly of Upper Canada in 1820 to represent the 4th Riding of Lincoln. He successfully brought a petition from the Upper Canadian legislature to the British Parliament in London asking for civil rights for American loyalists who moved to Upper Canada. Reformers used his biography to campaign against the political elite of Upper Canada. Historians are divided on Randal's success: some see him as a man who tried to deceive while others thought he was an unsuccessful businessman.

== Early life ==
Born Robert Randall in Maryland (Virginia in some sources) around 1766; after 1809, he spelled his surname Randal. In September 1795, Randal was part of a partnership with Vermont and Michigan merchants, including John Askin and William Robertson, which planned to buy the entire lower Michigan peninsula from the United States government. He claimed Anthony Wayne did not properly subdue the indigenous population and that thirty to forty Congressman had agreed to the group's proposed transaction. Randal was convicted of contempt for attempting to bribe members of the United States Congress in conjunction with this scheme and sentenced to a few days in custody and a reprimand.

== Upper Canada industrialist ==
In 1795 Randal purchased one-third of shares in a gristmill and sawmill operated by John McGill and Benjamin Canby on the Niagara River, but this agreement ended. Three years later Randal leased land north of the mills to build an iron foundry. He bought the mills from Elijah Phelps and David Ramsay, who assumed control of the mill's lease from McGill and Canby. Randal also bought 1,200 acres of land in Wainfleet, Upper Canada. His forge was not financially successful and in June 1800 he sold two-thirds of his business to his Montreal suppliers in exchange for paying off his debts. In 1802 the suppliers commissioned Randal to grind wheat into flour for shipment to England, but the suppliers went bankrupt and sold their shares in Randal's business to British creditors who sent James Durand to assume control of Randal's property.

Randal managed his business until August 1803 when he traveled to Cornwall leaving his property to be managed by Durand and Samuel Street Jr. He established a tannery, potash works and a ferry across the St. Lawrence River. In 1806 Phelps claimed he did not sell his land to Randal and returned to the mills to take possession of the property. Durand did not inform Randal about this and did not give payments to Randal. Randal avoided creditors while asking for amnesty for his debts, which he received in April 1808. Randal tried to raise funds to pay off his debts by building an ironworks at Chaudière Falls.

== Imprisonment and legal troubles ==
Randal was arrested in Montreal for unpaid debts in 1809 and remained in jail until 1815. While imprisoned Randal was successfully sued by Thomas Clark for debts relating to the mills. When Randal was released from prison he hired G. D'Arcy Boulton as his lawyer to defend his property rights. In 1816, Randal won his case at the Niagara District Assizes and the amount he would be awarded was to be determined by arbitration. The defence counsel refused to appoint an independent arbitrator so the case returned to the courtroom in 1817, where a jury awarded Randal £10,000 in damages.

The Court of the King's Bench ordered a new trial because the judge believed the jury gave an incorrect verdict. D'Arcy was appointed as a judge on the King's Bench and his son Henry John Boulton became Randal's lawyer. Henry agreed to represent Randal after receiving £100 and an IOU for £25 from Randal. The case was presented to D'Arcy but he refused to give a ruling because he had previously worked on this case so the trial was delayed for a year. Henry insisted that Randal pay the IOU while the trial was delayed but Randal did not have the finances, so Henry issued a notice for Randal to pay the debt. Henry proceeded to trial without Randal being notified and Randal's Ottawa property was sold to provide the money to Henry.

Randal appealed the decision when he learned of the sale of his Chaudière Falls property in January 1821. His appeal was unsuccessful. He also represented himself in the retrial against Phelps for the Niagara property and lost in that trial, too. Clark sued Randal for the settlement he won while Randal was imprisoned in Montreal and Randal's property in Wainfleet was sold to Clark at a price that undervalued the property.

== Provincial politics ==
In July 1820 Randal was a candidate for the Parliament of Upper Canada to represent the 4th Riding of Lincoln. His campaign focused on denouncing aristocrats and patronage appointments, abuse in the judicial system, and electing members that could independently scrutinise the executive branch of government. He easily defeated his opponent Isaac Swayze. In the 1824 election he swore an oath that he owned enough property to qualify as a legislature and listed property that had been sold to pay his debts. The attorney general sued Randal for libel claiming Randal knew he did not own this property anymore.

Randal hired John Rolph to represent him at the 1825 Niagara District assizes trial. Clark admitted at the trial that he coerced Randal into selling his property to him while Randal was imprisoned in Montreal, which weakened Clark's claim that he was the owner of the Niagara property since 1810. The jury deliberated for five minutes before ruling in Randal's favour.

In April 1827 Randal was chosen by the provincial steering committee to bring a petition signed by 14,000 people to the British government. The petition was calling on the government to give civil rights to immigrants to Canada who were previously deemed aliens. Randal was assured by British government officials that the British government would enact Randal's proposed legislation if the Upper Canadian government did not. Upper Canadian politicians were surprised by the positive reception that Randal received in Britain when they held a negative view of Randal's politics. Lieutenant-Governor Peregrine Maitland believed Randal's petition should have failed because Randal had a lower social standing than himself and also believed Randal's success would destabilise Upper Canadian politics. Upon celebrating the bill's passage in the Upper Canada Parliament, Jesse Ketchum revealed a painting of Randal speaking with the Colonial Secretary Lord Godrich. Randal won reelection in 1828 while supporting William Lyon Mackenzie's campaign for election to Parliament. He was reelected in 1830.

Randal opposed giving funds to the Welland Canal Company until 1830, when he was appointed as a commissioner to the company. The following year he voted to approve funds to build the canal, stating that the economic harm to businesses in his constituency was outweighed by the number of people it would benefit.

== Personal life and death ==
Randal was never married, although he had a daughter, whose mother was Deborah Pettit. He died on May 2, 1834, in Gravelly Bay, Upper Canada.

== Legacy ==
Some historians view Randal as a trickster who deserved the misfortune that befell upon him. In the United States he tried to trick American politicians into supporting his schemes and upon his immigration he was tricked into selling his land for an undervalued price and constantly lived in debt. Others see him as a naive optimist who did not possess the skills to run a business.

Randal was a popular political figure who the public viewed as a martyr towards the Family Compact and other members of the political aristocrats in Upper Canada. Reform politicians used his story as an example of a farmer fighting unsuccessfully against the corruption of the elite. Paul Romney considers Randal's successful mission to the British Colonial Office as the first major setback of the Family Compact in the final years of Upper Canada's existence.

== Works cited ==
- Godfrey, Charles (1993). John Rolph: Rebel with Causes. Madoc, Ontario: Condam Publishing. ISBN 0921453043.
- Johnson, J.K. (1989). Becoming prominent: regional leadership in Upper Canada, 1791-1841. Kingston, Ont: McGill-Queen's University Press. ISBN 9780773561571.
- Romney, Paul (1987). "Randal, Robert". In Halpenny, Francess G (ed.). Dictionary of Canadian Biography. Vol. VI (1821–1835) (online ed.). University of Toronto Press.
- Schrauwers, Albert (2009-01-01). Union is Strength: W.L. Mackenzie, the Children of Peace and the Emergence of Joint Stock Democracy in Upper Canada. Toronto: University of Toronto Press. ISBN 978-0-8020-9927-3.
- Wilton, Carol (2000). Popular Politics and Political Culture in Upper Canada, 1800-1850. Kingston: McGill-Queen's Press - MQUP. ISBN 978-0-7735-2053-0.
