= Raid on Short Hills =

- Part of the Patriot War
Date	June 21, 1838 – June 23, 1838
Location	Pelham, Ontario, Canada 43°04′45″N 79°16′57″W
Result	British victory

Belligerents
Hunters' Lodges	(United Kingdom) Upper Canada

Commanders and leaders
Samuel Chandler; Alexander McLeod; James Morreau	Robert Baillie; Allan MacNab; James Magrath

Strength
48 Hunter Patriots	13 Queen's Lancers; 4 Canadian Militia regiments (3rd Gore, Beverley Regiment, Queen's Own and the Queen's Rangers)

Casualties and losses
31 captured 2 wounded	13 captured (Note: All British soldiers captured in this battle were later released.); 1 wounded

The Raid on Short Hills (June 21–23, 1838) was an incursion and attack by the Hunter Patriots on the Niagara Peninsula during the Upper Canada Rebellion.

== The Raid ==
On June 11, 1838, Irish American James Morreau led a rebel raiding party of 26 Hunter Patriots across the Niagara River into Upper Canada. Morreau was aided by Samuel Chandler, a wagon maker from the village of St Johns in Thorold Township, Upper Canada. The party soon reached Pelham Township where they camped in the woods. Their intention was to get the locals to rise up in rebellion.

The night of June 21/22 the Patriots, in three groups, attacked a detachment of Queen's Lancers lodged on the 2nd floor of John Osterhout's tavern in St Johns. After a brief fire fight, the raiders attempted to set fire to the building - persuading the Lancers to surrender. Realizing the threat of imminent capture, the Patriots then fled westward towards Hamilton.

At dawn, the Lincoln Cavalry, Gore District militia volunteers sent by MC Nab (3rd Gore Regiment, 11th Gore (Township of Beverley) Regiment, Queen's Own Regiment Incorporated Militia and the Queen's Rangers), Queen's Lancers, and Natives from the Grand River were deployed to hunt down the Patriots. In short order, 31 Patriots were captured, bringing an end to the invasion.

== Aftermath ==
The leaders were gaoled at Niagara, and the rest at Drummondville (Niagara Falls, Ontario). Among the Patriots arrested were Chandler and Morreau. Chandler was later tried and sentenced to banishment to Tasmania for life, while Morreau was executed on July 30 in Niagara. Chandler escaped back to the United States, settled in Michigan and Iowa where he lived out his life.

James Morreau's grave is in the Catholic cemetery (Saint Vincent de Paul) at present day Niagara-on-the-Lake, Ontario.

Osterhout's tavern on Holland Road in St Johns was torn down circa 1900. The site of the action is currently unmarked.
