= Halton West (Province of Canada electoral district) =

Province of Canada electoral district

Halton West Canada West
Province of Canada electoral district

Defunct pre-Confederation electoral district
- Legislature: Legislative Assembly of the Province of Canada
- District created: 1841
- District abolished: 1867
- First contested: 1841
- Last contested: 1863

Halton West was an electoral district of the Legislative Assembly of the Parliament of the Province of Canada, in Canada West. It was created in 1841, upon the establishment of the Province of Canada by the union of Upper Canada and Lower Canada. It was based on the western portion of Halton County, termed a riding.

Halton West was represented by one member in the Legislative Assembly. It was abolished in 1867, upon the creation of Canada and the province of Ontario.

== Boundaries ==
Halton West electoral district was located in the western portions of Halton County (now partly in the Regional Municipality of Waterloo and partly in Wellington County). Its formal name was the West Riding of Halton County.

The Union Act, 1840 had merged the two provinces of Upper Canada and Lower Canada into the Province of Canada, with a single Parliament. The separate parliaments of Lower Canada and Upper Canada were abolished. The Union Act provided that the pre-existing electoral boundaries of Upper Canada would continue to be used in the new Parliament, unless altered by the Union Act itself.

Halton County had been an electoral district in the Upper Canada Parliament, but it was changed by the Union Act. The county had originally been split off from York County in 1816, and defined by statute as follows:

That the townships of Trafalgar, Nelson, Flamborough, the latter divided into Flamborough east and west, Beverly, and blocks number one, two, three, and four, on the Grand river, with the reserved lands in the rear of the townships of Blenheim and Blanford, do constitute and form the county of Halton, and the residue of the county of York shall be and remain the county of York.

Block number one on the Grand River was the Township of Dumfries; block number two was the Township of Waterloo; block number three was the Township of Woolwich; and block number four was the Township of Nichol.

In 1841, the County of Halton was split into two ridings for the new Parliament of the Province of Canada. The Union Act defined Halton West as follows:

That the County of Halton in the Province of Upper Canada shall be divided into Two Ridings, to be called respectively the East Riding and the West Riding; .... and that the West Riding of the said County shall consist of the following Townships, namely, Garafraxa, Nichol, Woolwich, Guelph, Waterloo, Wilmot, Dumfries, Puslinch, Eramosa...

== Members of the Legislative Assembly ==
Halton West was represented by one member in the Legislative Assembly. The following were the members for Halton West.

Parliament	Years	Member	Party
1st Parliament; 1841–1844	1841–1844	James Durand Jr.	Anti-unionist; Ultra-Reformer

== Abolition ==
The district was abolished on July 1, 1867, when the British North America Act, 1867 came into force, creating Canada and splitting the Province of Canada into Quebec and Ontario. It was succeeded by electoral districts of the same name in the House of Commons of Canada and the Legislative Assembly of Ontario.
