= Samuel Street =

Canadian politician (1773–1815)

- Born: January 2, 1753; Wilton, Connecticut
- Died: February 3, 1815 (aged 62); Thorold, Upper Canada
- Occupations: Merchant, politician, judge
- Years active: 1770s–1815

Samuel Street (January 2, 1753 – February 3, 1815) was a Canadian judge, merchant and political figure in Upper Canada. He was born in Wilton, Connecticut and traded with indigenous people during the American Revolution. He moved to Fort Niagara and opened a business to provide supplies to the British and later trade with indigenous people and the Indian Department. He was also a land speculator for the Niagara area. In 1796 he was elected to the Legislative Assembly of Upper Canada in the constituency of the 2nd riding of Lincoln and became speaker of the legislature in 1800. He lost his subsequent campaign for reelection but was elected to the constituency of the 3rd riding of Lincoln in 1808 and was elected again to become the speaker. During the War of 1812 he became a paymaster for Oxford and Lincoln militias and was appointed as acting deputy paymaster for the British militia. He died in Thorold, Upper Canada.

== Early life, family, and business career ==
Street was born in Wilton, Connecticut on January 2, 1753. His father was also named Samuel Street and his mother was Elizabeth Smith. His wife was Phoebe Van Camp and they had a daughter named Mary.

Street traded with indigenous people along the Susquehanna River during the American Revolution. In 1778, he moved to Fort Niagara where he provided supplies to the British. On July 10, 1780, he entered a partnership with two other merchants, although the partnership dissolved in 1781 and Street assumed the company's assets and debts. After the war, he was unable to trade with the British army and focused on selling goods to indigenous people and the Indian Department. His contact in the department was John Butler and Street formed a new partnership with Butler's son Andrew and opened a shop in Fort Niagara. In 1787 he was living in Chippawa, Ontario and his nephew, Samuel Street Jr. moved into Street's home after his nephew's father was murdered. In 1788, he became a justice of the peace in the Nassau District.

When their sales declined due to American competition, Street and Andrew Butler built a sawmill on Fifteen Mile Creek Street in 1789, which was sold to John Butler in 1792. In 1790 Guy Carleton, 1st Baron Dorchester and governor general of British North America ordered an investigation into their business for stealing supplies from the Indian Department and selling it in the shop. Sir John Johnson, 2nd Baronet concluded that, while Street and Andrew Butler's business was unusual and unaccountable, there was no reason to continue investigating the business.

Street became involved in land speculation to help resolve the debts he obtained in his business. He created the Niagara Company to manage this business and purchased shares in Oliver Phelps and Nathaniel Gorham's land speculation business. Street refused to sell his shares when Dorchester would not allow the land to be settled, and Street did not obtain much profit when he sold the shares later. He was also an agent for William Berczy's land settlement business called German Company, and purchased a quarter of Berczy's shares in 1794. When the company dissolved in 1796 Street could only obtain a small amount of what was owed to him from the business.

== Political career ==
In 1792 Street lost the election to represent the constituency of the 2nd riding of Lincoln in the Legislative Assembly of Upper Canada. He was resoundingly defeated by Benjamin Pawling. He won the subsequent election in 1796. In 1797 he was considered for an appointment to a commission tasked with renegotiating a customs-sharing agreement with Lower Canada, but the administrator was unable to contact Street to arrange the appointment, as Street was in the United States. In 1798 he supported a bill that would allow loyalist immigrants from the United States to Upper Canada to bring enslaved people with them.

In 1800, he was elected as speaker of the Upper Canadian legislative assembly. Later that year, merchant candidates like Street struggled in the 1800 general election for the legislative assembly because of public opposition to improving the Niagara Portage. He lost his reelection campaign to represent the 2nd riding of Lincoln by 22 votes. He also lost in the subsequent general election in 1804.

In 1807, he became a judge in the Niagara District. In 1808, he was elected to represent the 3rd riding of Lincoln and on July 27, 1812, he was elected for a second term as speaker of the legislature. During his term, Street issued a warrant for Robert Nichol for contempt against the legislature. Thomas Scott, the chief justice of Upper Canada, ruled that the warrant was issued in Street's personal capacity, not as his role as a speaker and that he did not have the authority to issue this warrant. His term as a legislator ended in 1812.

== War of 1812 and death ==
In 1809 Street became the captain of the 3rd Lincoln Militia. On October 9, 1812, he was appointed as the paymaster for the 1st Oxford Militia and the 2nd, 3rd, and 5th Lincoln Militias. On July 24, 1813, he was appointed as an official who could manage farms abandoned during the War of 1812 and later that year he became the acting deputy paymaster for the militia. On March 24, 1814, he was appointed as a district commissioner tasked with arresting traitors of the war. He received £1,333 (equivalent to £91,778 in 2025) in compensation from the British government for damage to his property during the war.

He died at Thorold, Upper Canada, on February 3, 1815. In his will, he left his estate to his daughter, Mary.

Preceded by Sir David William Smith, 1st Baronet	Speaker of the Legislative Assembly of Upper Canada; 1800–1801	Succeeded by Sir David William Smith, 1st Baronet

Preceded by Alexander Macdonell	Speaker of the Legislative Assembly of Upper Canada; 1809–1812	Succeeded by Allan McLean
