= Cecil Bisshopp =

British Army officer and politician (1783–1813)

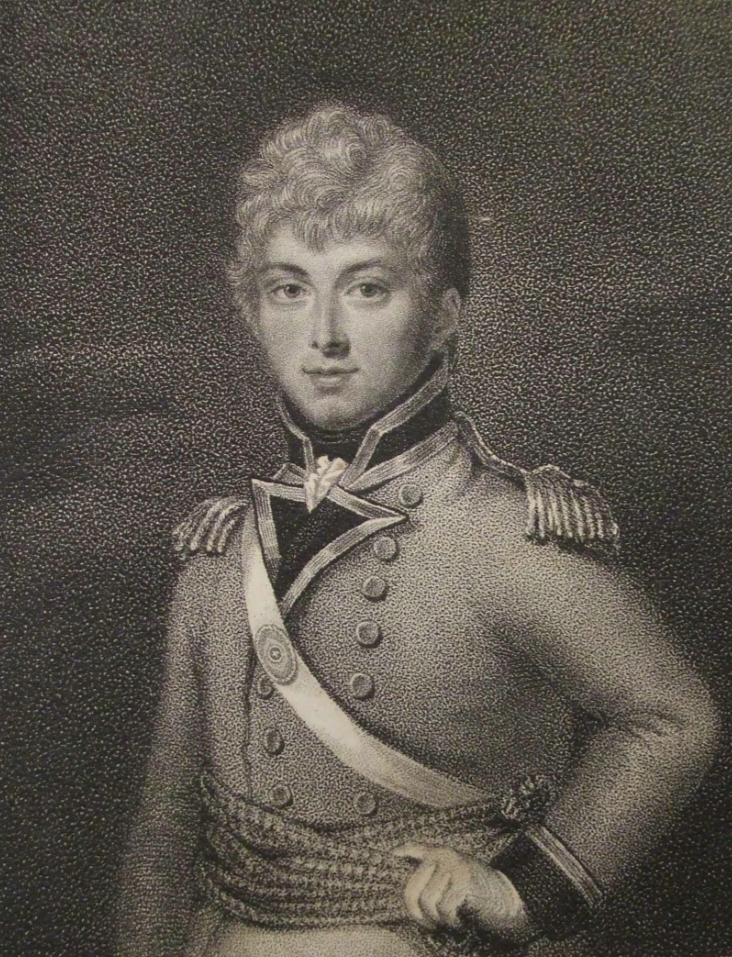

Member of Parliament for Newport (Isle of Wright)
- In office 1811–1812
- Preceded by: The Viscount Palmerston
- Succeeded by: Richard Worsley-Holmes

Personal details
- Born: 25 June 1783
- Died: 16 July 1813 (aged 30) Upper Canada

Military service
- Branch/service: British Army
- Years of service: 1799–1813
- Rank: Lieutenant-colonel
- Battles/wars: War of 1812; Raid on Black Rock (DOW)

Lieutenant-Colonel Cecil Bisshopp (25 June 1783 – c. 16 July 1813) was a British Army officer and onetime Member of the Parliament of the United Kingdom who came to Canada in 1812 and died in the War of 1812.

He was heir to his father Sir Cecil Bisshopp the 8th Baronet Bishopp, of Parham Park in the county of Sussex, England (later from 1815 the 12th Baron Zouche of Hayngworth). If he had survived his father, he would have become the 9th Baronet Bisshopp and eventually the 13th Baron Zouche. His mother was Harriet Anne Southwell.

He was Cornet in the Sussex Yeomanry 1797–1799 before entering the First Foot Guards as an Ensign, the most junior commissioned rank, in 1799. He was subsequently promoted Lieutenant and Captain in 1800, and Major in 1812.

He unsuccessfully contested New Shoreham in Sussex in 1807, then served as Member of Parliament (MP) for Newport, Isle of Wight from 1811 to 1812, not seeking re-election due to his military service in Canada.

Bisshopp was designated the inspecting field officer for the militia of Upper Canada. This carried the local rank of lieutenant-colonel. He would play an important role in the early war against the Americans in the War of 1812.

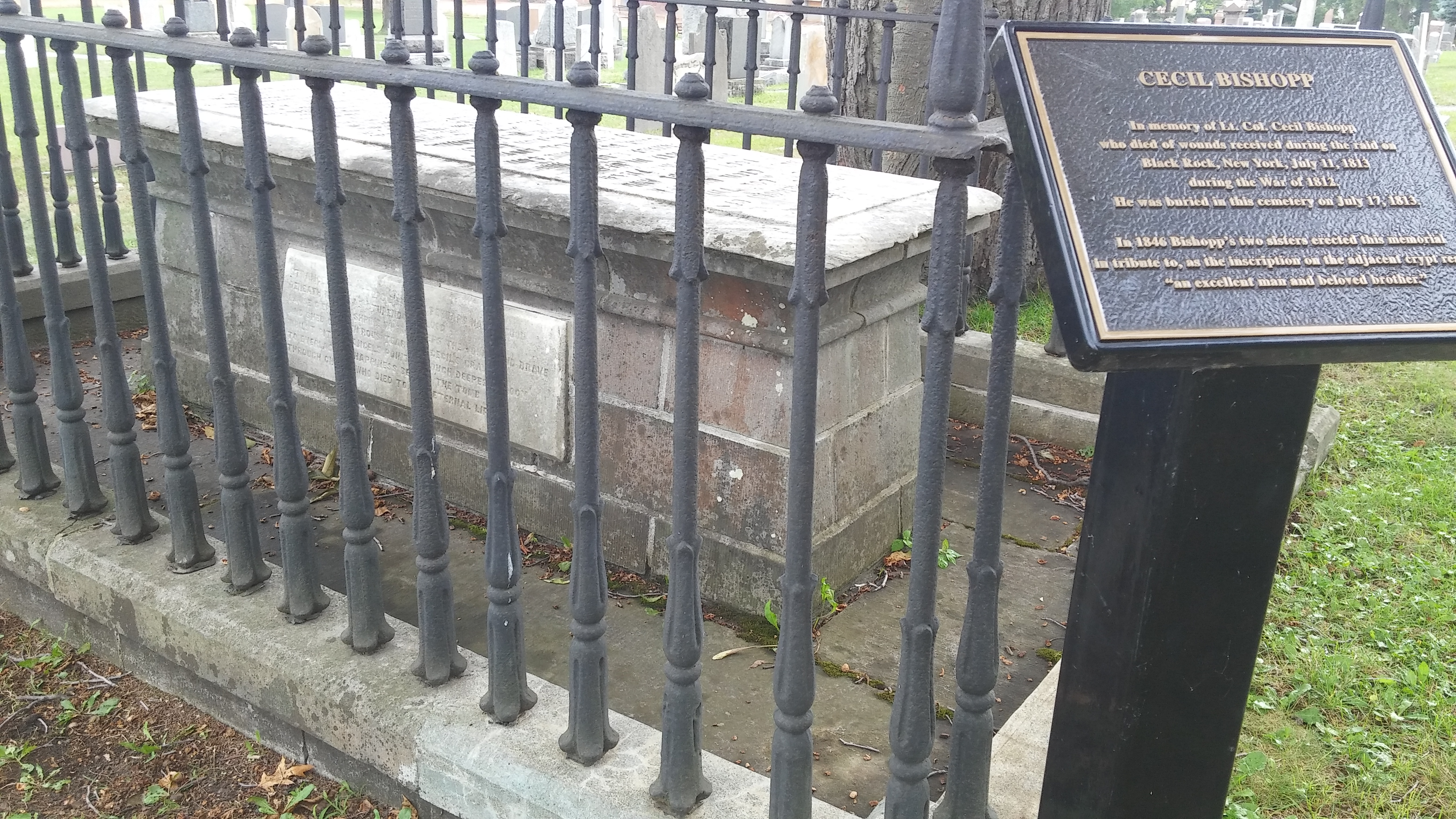
Bishopp's grave, Niagara Falls, Ontario

Bisshopp's final action in the war was to lead an attack on Black Rock, New York (now in Buffalo) from Fort George, Ontario. The raid was successful but their departure was delayed and he was injured in a counterattack. He died from his injuries a few days later. Bishopp is buried in the Lundy's Lane Battlefield Cemetery in Niagara Falls, Ontario.

His father Baron Zouche died on 11 November 1828 at age 74 at Parham Park, West Sussex, without surviving male issue. His younger brother Charles-Cecil, Royal Navy, had also died before his father, and was unmarried at his death in Jamaica in 1808 of yellow fever after the frigate HMS Muros was wrecked whilst endeavouring to destroy some batteries near Havana, Cuba. His father was succeeded in the Baronetcy by a cousin, while the Barony of Zouche fell into abeyance between Colonel Bisshopp's two sisters Hon. Harriet Anne Curzon and Katherine Annabella, Lady Brooke-Pechell.
