= James McNab =

James McNab was the first settler in Norval, Ontario, originally called "McNab's Mills"

McNab was an acting Lance Sergeant at the Battle of Queenston Heights during the War of 1812. He transferred to Captain John Powell's Provincial Artillery and had the rank of "Gunner" which was equivalent to the rank of Lieutenant. This matches his self-reported rank and history in the military as given in his Upper Canada Land Grant application.

McNab was not a United Empire Loyalist, since they were veterans of the American Revolution, but as a veteran of the War of 1812, he was similarly entitled to a grant of land. He was born in Barnet, Caledonia County, Vermont on 9 July 1787. He arrived from Vermont about 1805 and from 1812 to 1819 lived in Toronto where he later married his wife, Sarah Marsh. In 1812, he enlisted in the Lincoln Militia and fought on the Niagara front. When the area around Esquesing (later Norval) was opened for settlement in 1819, he obtained a land grant and moved his family there. He set up a grist mill and saw mill on the Credit River. In 1829, he lost a leg in a mill accident. He later sold the mills and moved to Owen Sound with his wife and family. He is referred to as "Colonel James McNab" in later years due to a promotion to Lieutenant Colonel on retirement. In 1837 he raised a troop of men during the 1837 Rebellion. It is said that he was unable to claim his expenses from the government and had to sell his mills to pay for the cost. He died in Owen Sound on 24 September 1866 and is buried in the Greenwood cemetery there.

In 1991, a historic plaque was unveiled in McNab Park in Norval, Ontario in his honour.

== Sources ==
- Norval History 1820-1950 by Joan (Browne) Carter
- McNabb, James. "Military, Mill and Rank details" (PDF). Title: British Military and Naval Records (RG 8, C Series). Collections Canada. p. 6.
- McNabb, James. "Military, Mill and Rank details" (PDF). Title: British Military and Naval Records (RG 8, C Series). Collections Canada. p. 7.
