= Alfred Barrett =

Canadian engineer (died 1849)

Alfred Barrett (died 18 July 1849) was an engineer from New England who worked on canal projects in the United States and Canada (then British North America).

In 1817, Barrett joined the engineering team constructing the Erie Canal in New York State, and by 1821, he had gained enough experience to become an engineer. On 10 May 1826, he was recruited by William Hamilton Merritt to be a resident superintending engineer over the Welland Canal in British North America.

After the banks of the Deep Cut slid into the channel of the Welland Canal in November 1828, Barrett worked with James Geddes to resurvey the canal and redesign the water supply system. The canal was reopened a year later on 30 November 1829. Barrett continued his work on the Welland Canal with the Port Colborne extension in 1831. In 1829, Barrett made the Welland Canal project into an alcohol-free "abstinence society"; however, in the years after he left the project, many "unlicensed grog shops" opened up nearby.

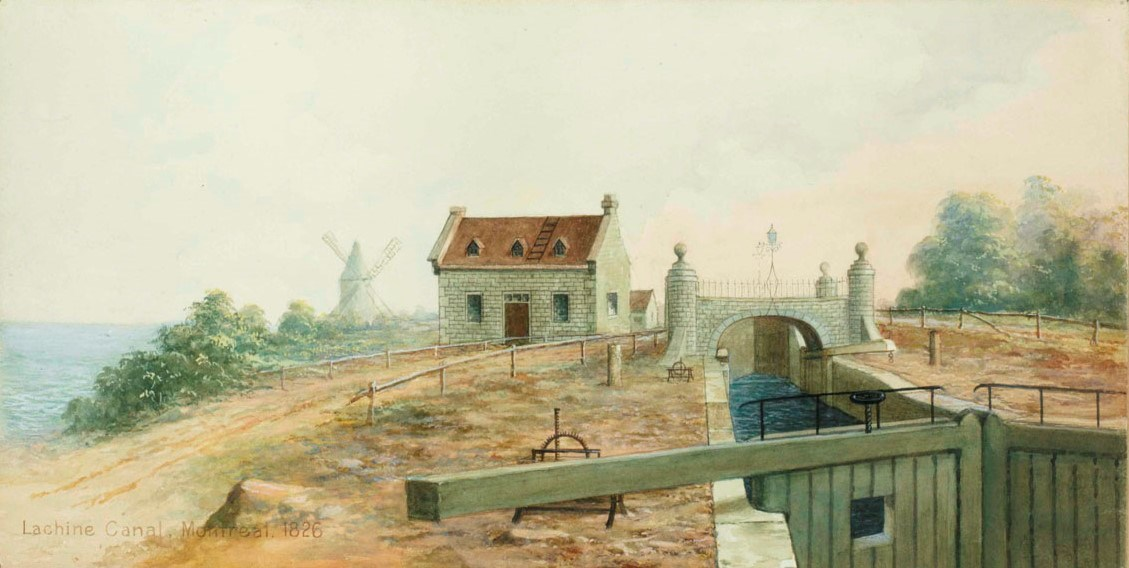
Watercolor of the entrance to Lachine Canal, c. 1826

Barrett returned to the United States in the 1830s to work on the Chenango Canal. In 1838, he became one of five chief engineers overseeing the enlargement of the Erie Canal. However, when funding priorities shifted, Barrett traveled back to British North America for work, becoming a resident engineer on the Lachine Canal near Montreal in 1843. Barrett designed new lock systems and water control structures to address a bottleneck issue in the overall canal system. Thanks to Barrett's efforts, Montreal became "Canadas' premier industrial city."

On 26 April 1848, Barrett wrote a letter and report arguing for infrastructure improvements at the mouth of the Saint-Charles River in Quebec City. He argued that these improvements would support increased trade from the Great Lakes region and make trade faster and cheaper overall.

Barrett died in Montreal on 18 July 1849 after contracting cholera.
