= Robert Runchey =

Canadian Soldier

Captain Robert Runchey
- Born: Robert Reuben Runchey; 1759; Ireland
- Died: 1819 (aged 59–60)
- Burial place: Grimsby, Ontario
- Spouse: Eléonarde Bonnat
- Children: Robert Reuben; George; Thomas
- Military career
- Allegiance: British Empire
- Branch: British Army
- Service years: 1774–1812
- Rank: Captain
- Units: 5th Regiment of Foot 1774–1797; 1st Lincoln Militia 1811–1812
- Commands: Captain Runchey's Company of Coloured Men 1812
- Conflicts: American Revolutionary War; War of 1812

Captain Robert Reuben Runchey (1759 – bur. 17 July 1819) was a Canadian tavern owner who served as the first commander of Captain Runchey's Company of Coloured Men in Upper Canada (now Ontario) during the War of 1812. Runchey was an officer in the 1st Lincoln Militia when Major-General Sir Isaac Brock appointed him commander of the all-black Company. He served from the summer of 1812 when the Company was created until the fall of that same year.

== Early life ==
Runchey was born in 1759 in Ireland and joined the British Army's 5th Regiment of Foot while it was stationed there. In 1774, around the outbreak of the American Revolution, the Regiment was sent to the American colonies where Runchey fought in battles such as Bunker Hill, Long Island, and Brandywine. His unit was then sent to Saint Lucia in 1778 and eventually traveled back to Ireland in 1780, where it remained until the end of the American Revolution in 1783.

The Regiment was dispatched to Canada from 1787 to 1797 where Runchey and his wife, Eleanor/Eléonarde (née Bonnat), settled. Their son, Robert Reuben, Jr., is listed as being born on the "Atlantic" on 22 December 1787, and was christened in the parish of Saint-Charles-sur-Richelieu, Province of Quebec (later known as Lower Canada after 1791, now Québec) the next day. Runchey and Eleanor had another son, George, in the Province of Quebec (to become known as Upper Canada after 1791) in 1789, and Runchey was discharged from the Regiment in 1797.

The government of Upper Canada granted Runchey land in Louth Township, Lincoln County, Upper Canada, just over 1.5 kilometres east of Jordan in 1791. There, Runchey opened and operated an inn and tavern that became a local landmark, serving as a coach stop since at least 1798. He and Eleanor had their youngest son, Thomas, in Upper Canada around this time.

== War of 1812 ==
At the beginning of the War of 1812, Runchey was serving as a Lieutenant in the 2nd Flank Company of the 1st Regiment of the Lincoln Militia. George was a sergeant in the same unit and Robert, Jr. acted as a private in the Niagara Light Dragoons. Runchey was not looked upon favourably by his fellow officers; on 8 June 1811, Colonel Ralfe Clench of the 1st Lincoln Militia described Runchey as

a worthless, troublesome Malcontent, it is rumord that he intents Personally to wait on his Excellency the Lieutenant Governor, and to request his acceptance of his resignation. This I sincerely hope he may do, and that his Excellency may be pleased to accept of the same, as he is almost the only one I can term a Black Sheep in our Regiment, and with whom the Officers I believe would gladly part.

Runchey did not resign from the Lincoln Militia, however, and in August 1812 Major-General Sir Isaac Brock chose him to lead Captain Runchey's Company of Coloured Men.

=== Captain Runchey's Company of Coloured Men ===
Richard Pierpoint was a former slave who had fought for the British during the American Revolution as part of the Butler's Rangers. At the outbreak of the War of 1812, he petitioned Major-General Sir Isaac Brock's administration to form an all-black military unit on the Niagara Frontier. His proposal was initially rejected by the colonial government, seeing it as unneeded, but later agreed after 12 July 1812, when American Brigadier-General William Hull attempted to invade Canada across the Detroit River.

Runchey was chosen to take command of the unit by the colonial government. The Company was formed within the Lincoln Militia, and Runchey's son, George, also detached from the 2nd Flank Company to serve as a lieutenant. The number of those in Runchey's Company varies by source and ranges from 27 to 50; men who wanted to join the Company met at Runchey's tavern.

Runchey separated the black soldiers under his command from white militiamen, once court-martialling "a white soldier for fraternising with "his nigros [sic]"" on 15 September 1812. There are also cases of Runchey hiring out his men as servants for other officers. On one occasion, Runchey did not carry out his promise to give a militia surgeon a "black man" as a servant and received a formal complaint.

Captain Runchey's Company of Coloured Men fought at Queenston Heights on 13 October 1812, though Runchey did not participate and Lieutenant James Cooper of the 2nd Lincoln Militia took command instead. There are no surviving records that show Runchey ever commanded his Company on the battlefield. Runchey resigned by 24 October 1812, though his son, George, remained with the unit. The Company went on to participate in battles such as Fort George and the Siege of Fort Erie and, after the war ended, disbanded on 24 March 1815.

== Later life ==
Runchey went back to running his tavern after his resignation from the Company. He died sometime before 17 July 1819, when he was buried in St. Andrew's Anglican Churchyard in Grimsby, Upper Canada; the exact date of his death is unknown.

== See also ==
- Canadian units of the War of 1812
