= William Hamilton Merritt III =

William Hamilton Merritt III (June 8, 1855 in St. Catharines, Canada West – October 26, 1918) was a Canadian soldier, author, and mining engineer. His grandfather, William Hamilton Merritt, was a politician in Ontario. Confusingly, his father and cousin also shared his name; even though he is now known as William Hamilton Merritt III, during his life, he did not refer to himself as the third.

== Biography ==
After completing schooling in Ontario at Trinity College School and Upper Canada College, Merritt studied at Clifton College and the Royal School of Mines in England, where he received his A.R.S.M. (Associate of the Royal Society of Mines). Upon returning to Canada, he published pamphlets on mining and taught at the School of Mining in Kingston, Ontario. He was elected vice-president of the Ontario Mining Institute.

Merritt also pursued a career as a soldier in the Canadian Militia. In 1882 he joined The Governor General's Body Guard, where he was promoted quickly through the ranks. In 1903, he became lieutenant-colonel. Merritt served in the North-West Rebellion and the Boer War, but by 1914 he was too old to serve in the First World War. He maintained an interest in military matters, though, and published a book, Canada and National Service, which advocated compulsory military service. Merritt was also president of the Canadian Defence League, which advocated universal military training.

The city of Merritt, British Columbia, is named after William Hamilton Merritt III, due to his role in bringing the railway through the Nicola Valley. In 1890 he married Margaret Simpson, daughter of Toronto merchant Robert Simpson. In 1891, Merritt prospected for coal near where the city is today. Finding it, he organized the Nicola, Kamloops and Similkameen Coal and Railway Company to extend the rail line through to transport coal out of the valley. The railway also allowed settlement and industry to flourish in the valley. As demand for coal grew, the company was eventually bought by the Canadian Pacific Railway.
