= Petition of Free Negroes =

The Petition of Free Negroes was a document created by a group of freed slaves who had fought for the British in the American Revolutionary War, and been rewarded with land grants in Upper Canada for their service to the Crown. Because the grants were spread around the province, isolating the freed men among the otherwise-white settlers, on June 29, 1794, nineteen men from the Niagara region submitted a petition to Lieutenant Governor John Graves Simcoe hoping to address this. Their petition read:

That there are a number of Negroes in this part of the Country many of whom have been Soldiers during the late ware between Great Britain and America, and others who were born free with a few who have come into Canada since the peace, -Your Petitioners are desirous of settling adjacent to each other that they may be enabled to give assistance (in work) to those amongst them who may most want it. Your Petitioners therefore humbly Pray that their situation may be taken into consideration, and if your Excellency should see fit to allow them a Tract of Country to settle on, separate from the white Settlers, your Petitioners hope their behaviour will be such as to shew, that Negroes are capable of being industrious, and in loyalty to the Crown they are not deficient.

Listed as having signed the petition were Jack Baker, Jack Becker, John Cesar, John Dimon, Tom Frey, John Gerof, Peter Green, Michael Grote, John Jackson, Adam Lewis, Peter Ling, Richard Pierpoint, Pompadour, John Smith, Saison Sepyed, Simon Speck, Robert Spranklin, Thomas Walker and Jack Wurmwood.

The petition was turned down by Simcoe for unknown reasons, although the recent abolition of slavery in the province had generated no small amount of hostility and his refusal may have been a way of avoiding revisiting the contentious act.

== Sources ==
- Meyler, David and Peter (1999). A Stolen Life: Searching for Richard Pierpoint. Toronto: Natural Heritage Books. ISBN 1-896219-55-1.
- Pitt, Steve (2008). To Stand and Fight Together: Richard Pierpoint and the Coloured Corps of Upper Canada. Toronto: Dundurn Press. ISBN 978-1-55002-731-0.
