= Benjamin Pawling =

Canadian politician

Benjamin Pawling (c. 1749 – buried December 16, 1818) was a soldier, judge, political figure and publisher in Upper Canada.

== Early life ==
He was born in Philadelphia, Pennsylvania. His parents probably emigrated to North America from Wales. His family's property was confiscated at the beginning of the American Revolution and he joined the British forces at Quebec City in 1777 with his occupation listed as farmer. He was assigned to Butler's Rangers in 1778 and he became a captain in 1784 and retired that same year.

Pawling settled in Grantham Township in the Niagara region in 1783. He served on the land board of the Nassau District and Lincoln County. He was appointed to the Court of Common Pleas in 1788 and became a justice of the peace the following year. He sparsely attended hearings with the land board or the court and requested his resignation to the lieutenant governor of Upper Canada in 1793. His position of judge ended upon the abolishment of the Court of Common Pleas in 1794.

Pawling married a woman named Susan and had six children.

== Later career ==
In 1792, he was elected to the 1st Parliament of Upper Canada representing the 2nd riding of Lincoln. He defeated prominent merchant Samuel Street 148 votes to 48. He remained the constituency's representative until 1796. In 1794 he became a major in the Lincoln militia and resigned sometime before 1806.

On December 3, 1818, a person named Pawling was listed as a publisher and printer for the Niagara Spectator. Some identified this as Benjamin Pawling, although the publisher might have been his nephew. Later that month, Pawling was charged with libel over a letter published in the newspaper written by Robert Fleming Gourlay. An assemblyman named Isaac Swayze reported that Pawling was held on £400 (equivalent to £29,627 in 2025) bail.

Pawling died in Grantham Township on December 12, 1818, and buried on December 16.
