= Lincoln Militia =

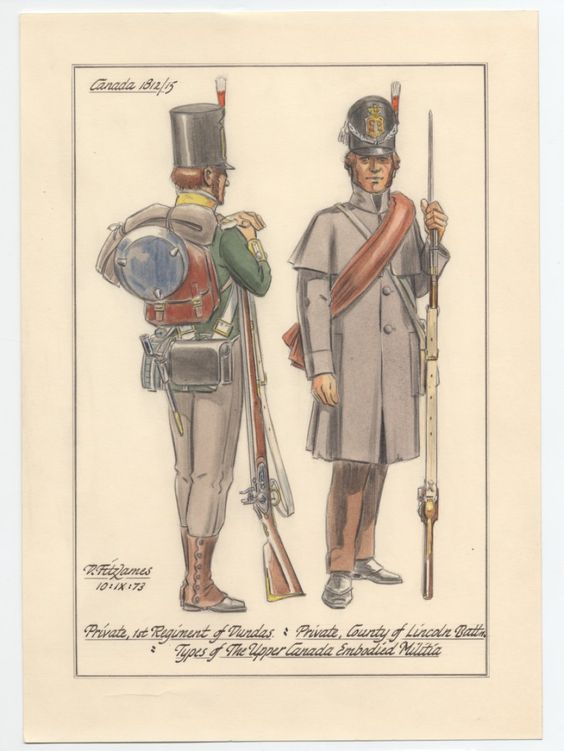
- A Lincoln County Militia private (right) in 1813
- Active: c.1793-1866
- Country: Upper Canada
- Allegiance: British Empire
- Branch: Canadian Militia
- Type: Militia
- Size: 5 Regiments
- Garrison/HQ: Niagara District
- Engagements: War of 1812: Siege of Detroit; Battle of Queenston Heights; Battle of Frenchman's Creek; Battle of Fort George; Battle of Stoney Creek; Raid on Fort Schlosser; Raid on Black Rock; Battle of Chippawa; Battle of Lundy's Lane; Siege of Fort Erie; Upper Canada Rebellion: Raid on Short Hills; Fenian Raids

The Lincoln County Militia, also commonly known as the Lincoln Militia, were a volunteer militia unit in Upper Canada and later the Province of Canada formed after the passage of the Militia Act of 1793. Organized from the local settler population of Lincoln County, it served principally during the War of 1812 and later during the Rebellions of 1837–1838.

== Early years ==
In 1794, John Butler, who had commanded Butler's Rangers during the American Revolution was appointed Commanding Officer of three battalions of Nassau Militia. Nassau (later Home District) was one of the Districts of Upper Canada, Niagara being only part of the district. By 1791 the battalions had a strength of 835 all ranks.

With the reorganization of the province into sixteen counties in 1792, Lincoln County (with 20 townships) came into existence. Militia service in Upper Canada was established by the Militia Act passed during the second session of the colony’s first parliament in 1794. It required most male inhabitants between the ages of 16 and 50—later extended to 60—to enrol in a “Sedentary Militia.” These men were organized into county regiments and companies, mustered and inspected twice a year, but were not normally armed, uniformed, or paid by the government.

The militia was renamed and the Lincoln Militia, with three battalions came into being, some 849 strong. By 1794, Butler was a full colonel with four battalions reporting 976 all ranks. Many of the officers, NCOs and men had served with Butler’s Rangers during the Revolution and had received land grants in Niagara for this service.

== Organization ==
By 1808, there were five regiments of Lincoln Militia:

| Regiment | Commanding Officer | Principal recruiting area |
|---|---|---|
| 1st Regiment of Lincoln Militia | Colonel Ralfe Clench and Lieutenant-Colonel Robert Kerr | Niagara, Louth and Grantham townships |
| 2nd Regiment of Lincoln Militia | Lieutenant-Colonel Peter Ball | Stamford, Thorold and Pelham |
| 3rd Regiment of Lincoln Militia | Lieutenant-Colonel Henry Warren | Crowland, Willoughby and Bertie |
| 4th Regiment of Lincoln Militia | Lieutenant-Colonel Johnson Butler | Grimsby and Clinton |
| 5th Regiment of Lincoln Militia | Colonel Peter Hare and Lieutenant-Colonel Andrew Brandt | Ancaster, Barton, Saltfleet, Glanford and Binbrook |

== War of 1812 ==
At the outbreak of the War of 1812, the Lincoln Militia occupied a strategically vital position: Lincoln County contained the Niagara frontier, one of the principal theatres of the war. Its flank companies—small selected bodies of active militia (limited to three officers and 38 men)—were assembled along the Niagara River and Peninsula. The flank companies from all 5 regiments would take part in every major engagement from Niagara to Detroit; taking the field together with militias raised by various former officers including Colonel Isaac Swayze and did most of the militia's fighting.

The 1st Lincoln Militia served as a combat unit in the Niagara Peninsula. It fought alongside British regulars and Indigenous warriors under John Norton at the Battle of Queenston Heights. British commanders commended its fighting spirit, and the regiment was reported to have suffered no casualties in that action.

Lincoln Militia units also participated in actions including the capture of Fort Detroit, the Battles of Fort George and Stoney Creek, and the Niagara campaign; including the Battles of Chippawa and Lundy’s Lane and the Siege of Fort Erie. Because the county lay directly in the path of American invasions, its militia was called out more frequently than most other Upper Canadian militia formations.

=== Coloured Corps ===
In August 1812, a segregated company of Black militiamen was formed within the 1st Lincoln Militia under Captain Robert Runchey. The company grew to 38 men by the autumn of 1812 after transfers from the 3rd York Militia and trained at Fort George.

The company took part in the final charge at Queenston Heights. In early 1813 it was redesignated the Coloured Corps and became part of Upper Canada’s militia establishment. It subsequently fought during the American attack on Fort George in May 1813 and later performed garrison, patrol, skirmishing, and fortification-construction duties.

The Coloured Corps was disbanded on 24 March 1815, after the end of the war. Its members later faced delays and difficulties in receiving militia gratuities and land grants.

== Post-1815 ==
In 1816, when part of the Niagara District was split off to form the Gore District; the 5th Lincoln Militia was also split off to form the core of the new Gore Militia.

== Upper Canada Rebellion ==
The Upper Canada Rebellion began in December 1837, when reformers led by William Lyon Mackenzie attempted to overthrow the colony’s entrenched governing elite, the Family Compact. Although the main rising was defeated around Toronto, unrest and cross-border raids which came to be known as the Patriot War continued in the Niagara Peninsula into 1838. During this time, units of the Lincoln Militia were mobilized to suppress rebel activity in the Niagara Peninsula.

Lincoln County’s location on the Niagara frontier made the militia especially important during the rebellion. The county’s regiments were used for local defence, patrols, and support of regular troops, while the Lincoln Cavalry and other militia volunteers helped respond to reports of rebel activity and incursions from the United States. The 2nd Lincoln Militia was warned for service in Toronto and, in 1838, marched into the Short Hills to counter rebel activity there.

The episode demonstrated both the vulnerability of the Niagara frontier to cross-border raiding and the continuing usefulness of the Lincoln Militia as a local security force. It also showed that the militia’s role had shifted from resisting a foreign invasion, as in 1812, to maintaining internal order during a political insurrection.

== Later history ==
In 1846, Lincoln County was divided and Welland County was formed with three battalions of militia. The militia "regiments" were later renamed as "battalions".

The old sedentary militia system gradually gave way to a volunteer system after the Province of Canada passed the Militia Act of 1855. That law authorized armed, uniformed volunteer units that could be paid while training or on active service.

== Fenian Raids ==
By the time of the 1866 Fenian Raids, the Lincoln Militia had mostly been replaced and reorganized into the new Active Militia: later the Non-Permanent Active Militia [NPAM]. The active volunteer companies raised from what had previously been the Lincoln Militia and the Welland Militia would go onto form the 19th Lincoln Regiment and the 44th Welland Regiment.

== Perpetuation ==
Within the Canadian Army, the 1st, 2nd, 3rd, 4th and 5th Regiments of Lincoln Militia are perpetuated by the Lincoln and Welland Regiment, and the regiment bears the War of 1812 battle honours won by the Lincoln Militia:

- Defence of Canada – 1812–1815 – Défense du Canada
- Detroit
- Queenston
- Niagara

== Notable members ==
- Colonel John Butler
- Colonel Isaac Swayze
- Colonel William Claus
- Lieutenant Colonel Thomas Clark
- Lieutenant Colonel Thomas Dickson
- Lieutenant Colonel John Warren
- Lieutenant Colonel Samuel Street Jr.
- Lieutenant Colonel James McNab
- Major David Secord
- Captain William Hamilton Merritt
- Captain George Hamilton
- Captain James Crooks
- Captain Robert Runchey
- Captain John DeCew
- Captain Samuel Street
- Captain James Durand
- Captain David Thompson
- Sergeant James Secord
- James Gage
- Richard Pierpoint

== See also ==
- Canadian units of the War of 1812
