= Nicola, Kamloops and Similkameen Coal and Railway Company =

Subsidiary of the Canadian Pacific Railway

The Nicola, Kamloops and Similkameen Coal and Railway Co (NK&S), ultimately a Canadian Pacific Railway (CP) subsidiary, connected Spences Bridge and Nicola in south central British Columbia. This standard gauge trackage, which followed the Nicola River, formed the CP Nicola Subdivision.

== Coal cartage opportunity ==
A prospector named Kennedy from Ashcroft was believed to be the first European to discover coal in the area. Subsequently, First Nations took quantities of coal to Lytton for blacksmiths during the Cariboo Gold Rush, as did packhorses to Clinton as early as 1869. Local settlers extracted these surface outcroppings with a pick and shovel to fuel their fires.

In 1877–1878, the Geological Survey Department of Canada first reported coal in the area.

Following contact with Albert Elgin Howse of Nicola and reading the Dawson report of 1886, Lieutenant-Colonel William Hamilton Merritt III journeyed from Toronto in 1887. On finding coal in what is known as the Pot Hole, west of the Coldwater 1 Reserve, he purchased a large tract of coal lands. He proceeded to the Coast to form an investor syndicate to apply for a railway charter, because establishing economical transportation was a prerequisite.

== Railway charters ==
In 1891, the Nicola Valley Railway Co (NV) obtained a charter to build from Spences Bridge to the western end of Nicola Lake, with a branch line south along the Coldwater River to Voght Creek. Construction needed to commence within three years and be completed within five. The NV syndicate comprised Charles Whetham, Stephen Tingley, and Dr. John M. Lefevre (president). Later that year, the NK&S obtained a charter for the same route by disguising its application as Kamloops to Osoyoos via the Nicola Valley and Princeton, with a branch to Spences Bridge. The NV unsuccessfully opposed the NK&S application. Led by Howse and W.H. Merritt, the NK&S syndicate also comprised John F. Allison, R.H. Lee, A.M. Nanton, Sandford H. Fleming, Frank A. Fleming, C.H. Keefer, Geo F. Harman, and C.F. Shanley.

In 1892, the NV was granted a $3,200 per mile construction subsidy, and the principals obtained options on coal rights immediately south of present Merritt, covering 39 to 52 square kilometres (15 to 20 sq mi) of coal lands. The 1894 announcement that construction would shortly commence came to nothing.

Equally unable to secure financing, the NK&S charter lapsed. W.H.Merritt and two others were all that remained of the original syndicate when the NK&S charter for a Spences Bridge–Nicola line was renewed in 1903. The $6,400 per mile federal construction subsidy for the first 72 kilometres (45 mi) was expected to also attract provincial financial assistance. That year, they sold the charter to eastern capitalists from Ontario. A year later, a New York syndicate apparently bought the charter.

== Railway construction project ==
=== Approval in principle ===
In 1904, false rumours circulated that CP had acquired the NK&S charter. That year, John Hendry, who possessed good connections within CP, staked out 1,100 hectares (2,700 acres) of coal rights southwest of present Merritt with the intention of starting a colliery. That summer, Dr. R.W. Ells conducted coal surveys, which appeared in the annual report of the Geological Survey Department that year. This highlighting of the coalmining potential lifted the Nicola Valley out of obscurity. Ellis concluded that the coal quality and reserves compared very favourably with those of Vancouver Island and the Crowsnest.

=== Associated opposition ===
Coal magnate James Dunsmuir had been unsuccessful in acquiring John Hendry's extensive coal rights. In August 1905, he secured an option for coal development on another 1,100 hectares (2,800 acres) but planned to leave the property idle for two years. This would eliminate competition from other speculators and also benefit his Vancouver Island mines, but the landowners thwarted his attempts. Next, he claimed the coal was of poor quality and limited quantity, so he was no longer interested in the option. He imagined his rejection of the area might induce Hendry to abandon the adjoining coal rights. However, the press exposed the scandal and dashed his hopes of buying up all the Nicola options at bargain prices.

=== Approval to proceed ===
In May 1905, CP announced that work would begin that summer on the railway line, the prime contractor having acquired the NK&S charter on behalf of the railway.

CP obtained locomotive coal from Vancouver Island mines, where labour disputes threatened the ongoing supply. Consequentially, access to the Nicola region reserves assumed greater importance.

=== Progress ===
Loss and MacDonnell, the prime contractor, commenced the $1,500,000 project in July 1905. To minimize heavy rock cuts, the right-of-way crossed the Nicola River multiple times. That month, the wagon road, which had struggled to justify a bi-weekly stage service, introduced competing daily services.

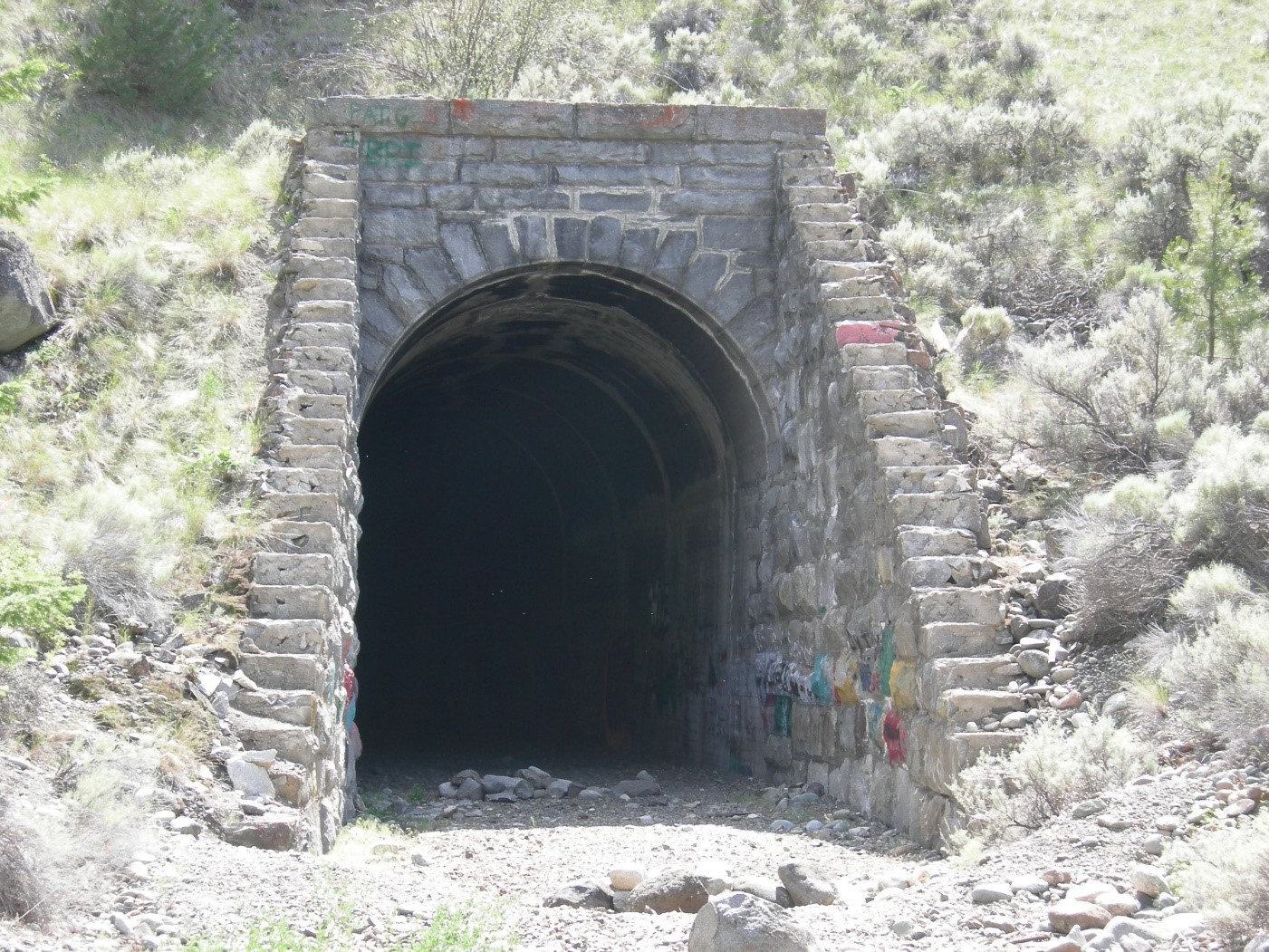
Northwest portal of Clapperton Tunnel, 2015

The initial subcontractors west to east were:

- Foss and Sutherland, 6 kilometres (4 mi), involving some heavy rock work.
- Ironside, Rannie and Campbell, 5 kilometres (3 mi), requiring heavy rock work and the heaviest earth cuts.
- Pat Allen, 6 kilometres (4 mi), consisting mainly of earthwork.
- Bright, 16 kilometres (10 mi), involving stretches of comparatively light construction work.
- Cook, Quinn and Brassie, 16 kilometres (10 mi), entailing mostly light scraper work.

That October, a new work camp was set up at Coutlee to work both ways. The next month, Ironside, Rannie and Campbell were awarded the bridgework, tracklaying and ballasting contract. By December, one thousand men were working at 20 different camps along the route.

In January 1906, tracklaying began at Spences Bridge. In mid-March, the eastward advance of the rail head reached the Clapperton Tunnel, having progressed at 1.2 kilometres (0.75 mi) per day. When subcontractor McLean finished the tunnel, tracklaying proceeded. That year, labour shortages continued to delay progress. The rail head reached Coutlee in early June 1906 and Nicola in November 1906.

Following inspection of the completed line in March 1907, tri-weekly passenger service began at the beginning of April.

=== Extension ===
CP proposed to later extend the track eastward via Quilchena to Princeton. The construction announcement in June 1909 revealed the plan had been revised to an extension southward from Merritt via the Coldwater River. By December 1910, 6 kilometres (4 mi) of track had been laid. In late September 1911, the rail head reached Otter Summit.

== Service within geographical context ==
CP Train Timetables (Regular stop or Flag stop)
	Mile	1909	1912	1915	1916	1919	1929	1932	1935	1939	1943	1948	1954	1957	1960	1963
Spence's Bridge	0.0	Reg.	Reg.	Reg.	Reg.	Reg.	Reg.	Reg.	Reg.	Reg.	Reg.	Reg.	Reg.	Reg.	Reg.	Reg.
Clapperton	10.1	Flag	Flag	Both	Flag	Flag	Flag	Flag	Flag	Flag	Flag	Flag	Flag	Flag		
Agate	17.3							Flag	Flag	Flag	Flag	Flag	Flag	Flag		
Dot	20.3	Reg.	Reg.	Both	Flag	Flag	Flag	Flag	Flag	Flag	Flag	Flag	Flag	Flag		
Canford Mill	28.2					Flag										
Canford	29.3	Reg.	Reg.	Both	Flag	Flag	Flag	Flag	Flag	Flag	Flag	Flag	Flag	Flag		
Coyle	35.0	Reg.	Reg.	Both	Flag	Flag	Flag	Flag	Flag	Flag	Flag	Flag	Flag	Flag		
Coutlee	37.8	Reg.	Reg.	Both	Flag	Flag	Flag	Both	Flag	Flag	Flag	Flag	Flag	Flag		
Merritt	39.8	Reg.	Reg.	Reg.	Reg.	Reg.	Reg.	Reg.	Reg.	Reg.	Reg.	Reg.	Reg.	Reg.		
Nicola	47.0	Reg.	Reg.	Reg.	Reg.	Reg.			Reg.		Reg.	Reg.				

== Railway infrastructure and incidents ==
=== Initial route ===
CP Infrastructure and incidents for Spences Bridge–Clapperton
Mile^{a}	Place	Passenger Service	Station Building				Section House		Section Crew		Storage Capacity		Engine House	Track		Ref.
Mile^{a}	Place	Passenger Service	Type	Built	Closed	Comments	Built	Comments	From	To	Water Tank	Coal Chute	Engine House	Passing	Other	Ref.
0.0	Spences Bridge															
1.0	Highway crossing.															
	In 1926, four cars of a westbound passenger train derailed.															
1.4	Highway crossing.															
6.0	In 1927, an eastbound locomotive and tender derailed when struck by a 23-tonne (25-short-ton) boulder.															
6.8	A 45,000-litre; 12,000-US-gallon (10,000 imp gal) enclosed tank erected c.1907 on the south side of the main line. Deactivated before 1930. Removed.															
8.2	Nicola River: 30-metre (100 ft) steel deck truss span and 15-metre (50 ft) deck plate girder span.															
8.3	Highway crossing.															
9.4	Highway crossing.															
9.6	Clapperton (Ten Mile) Tunnel: 99-metre (324 ft) concrete lined tunnel. The portals are made of cut stone.															

^a . Mileages are 1931–1961, measured from the Spences Bridge Station building.

CP Infrastructure and incidents for Clapperton–Agate
Mile^{a}	Place	Passenger Service	Station Building				Section House		Section Crew		Storage Capacity		Engine House	Track		Ref.
Mile^{a}	Place	Passenger Service	Type	Built	Closed	Comments	Built	Comments	From	To	Water Tank	Coal Chute	Engine House	Passing	Other	Ref.
10.1	Clapperton^{d}	Apr 1907 to Oct 1957	None	N/A	N/A		c.1906.^{c}	Removed after 1962.	Apr 1907	May 1962	None	None	None	Feb 1916 to Apr 1965. Length 545 metres (1,789.5 ft)		
	In 1909, an incorrectly set switch sent a westbound train into a stationary truck and freight car.															
	In 1911, three passenger cars and five coal cars of a mixed train derailed.															
12.0	In 1918, several loaded coal cars of a westbound freight train derailed into a ditch.															
13.3	Highway crossing.															
13.7	Highway crossing, after paralleling north of highway from Mile 13.3. After the rails were lifted, the highway moved onto the former railway grade.															
14.3	Skuhun (KV Potato Illahe) Creek: 5-metre (15 ft) wall culvert span. Replaced by 5-metre (18 ft) timber deck bridge on concrete abutments in 1946, which were damaged in the 1948 flood.															
14.5	Nicola River: 50-metre (163 ft) steel half deck plate girder spans.															
14.8	Shakan Creek: 5-metre (15 ft) wall culvert span. Replaced by 5-metre (15 ft) timber deck bridge on concrete abutments at unknown date. A 91,000-litre; 24,000-US-gallon (20,000 imp gal) enclosed tank erected c.1925 on the south side of the main line. Deactivated winter 1953–54. Removed.															

^a . Mileages are 1931–1961, measured from the Spences Bridge Station building.
^b . Unless specified otherwise, infrastructure detail is c.1931.
^c . Section house erected on the southwest side of the main line.
^d . Station opened as Cartwright, prior to rename within a year. Conway Edward Cartwright and John Clapperton were valley pioneers.

CP Infrastructure and incidents for Agate–Dot
Mile^{a}	Place	Passenger Service	Station Building				Section House		Section Crew		Storage Capacity		Engine House	Track		Ref.
Mile^{a}	Place	Passenger Service	Type	Built	Closed	Comments	Built	Comments	From	To	Water Tank	Coal Chute	Engine House	Passing	Other	Ref.
17.3	Agate^{b}	Oct 1920 to Oct 1957	None	N/A	N/A		None		N/A	N/A	None	None	None	None		
17.5	Manning Creek: 4-metre (14.5 ft) wall culvert span. Replaced by 5-metre (15 ft) timber deck bridge on concrete abutments in 1946.															
18.0	Nicola River: Pony truss. Replaced by 32-metre (106 ft) steel pony truss and 15-metre (50 ft) half deck plate girder span at unknown date.															
19.0	Manning Creek FSR crossing.															
19.7	Gordon Creek: 4-metre (13.5 ft) wall culvert span. Replaced by 5-metre (16 ft) timber deck bridge on concrete abutments.															
	In 1911, a freighthopper sustained fatal injuries on attempting to board a moving westbound train.															

^a . Mileages are 1931–1961, measured from the Spences Bridge Station building.
^b . Named after agates found in the creek.

CP Infrastructure and incidents for Dot–Canford Mill
Mile^{a}	Place	Passenger Service	Station Building				Section House		Section Crew		Storage Capacity		Engine House	Track		Ref.
Mile^{a}	Place	Passenger Service	Type	Built	Closed	Comments	Built	Comments	From	To	Water Tank	Coal Chute	Engine House	Passing	Other	Ref.
20.4	Dot^{d}	Apr 1907 to Oct 1957	Bohi's Type 10.	1906.^{c}	Apr 1969	Removed c.1970	c.1906.^{c}	Removed c.1970	Apr 1907	c.1969	None	None	None	Feb 1916 to Jul 1990. Length 48 metres (157.6 ft)		
	Being about half way on the Nicola wagon road, James Phair established a ranch and stopping place c.1875. The establishment had a liquor licence and was well patronized prior to the railway.															
21.0	Backwater: 18-metre (60 ft) timber pile trestle. Rebuilt in 1934.															
21.4	Nicola River: 46-metre (150 ft) Howe truss. Replaced by 48-metre (158.7 ft) steel through truss span in 1942. Later strengthened by an exterior truss span. East abutment washed out in 1948. Permanent repairs completed in 1951.															
24.4	In 1918, about 5 coal cars derailed.															
26.2	Nooaitch Creek: 5-metre (16 ft) timber deck on concrete abutments. A 91,000-litre; 24,000-US-gallon (20,000 imp gal) enclosed tank existed on the south side of the main line. Deactivated winter 1953–54. Removed.															
28.1	Petit Creek Rd crossing.															
	In 1913, the locomotive and all the cars of an eastbound passenger train derailed.															

^a . Mileages are 1931–1961, measured from the Spences Bridge Station building.
^b . Unless specified otherwise, infrastructure detail is c.1931.
^c . At the end of the farm road off Dot Ranch Cutoff Rd. Both on the northeast side of the main line, the station was immediately to the north and the section house just beyond.
^d . Named after Dalton (Dot) Marpole, local rancher and son of CP's Richard Marpole. In Jan 1908, Dot died when his ranch house burned.

CP Infrastructure and incidents for Canford Mill–Coyle
Mile^{a}	Place	Passenger Service	Station Building				Section House		Section Crew		Storage Capacity		Engine House	Track		Ref.
Mile^{a}	Place	Passenger Service	Type	Built	Closed	Comments	Built	Comments	From	To	Water Tank	Coal Chute	Engine House	Passing	Other	Ref.
28.2	Canford Mill^{c}	Jul 1916 to May 1927	None	N/A	N/A		None		N/A	N/A	None	None	None	None		
	In 1910, a freighthopper sustained fatal injuries on falling from a moving flatcar, after which the body was dragged about 19 kilometres (12 mi).															
	In 1912, a brakeman atop a freight car which derailed and fell into a pond sustained fatal injuries.															
28.4	Nicola River: 46-metre (150 ft) Howe truss. Replaced by 48-metre (158.7 ft) steel through truss span in 1940. Later strengthened by exterior truss span. When east abutment washed out in 1949, permanent repairs were not completed until 1952. Filming location for Jurassic World: Dominion (2022). The 2021 Pacific Northwest floods washed away the bridge.															
29.3	Sunshine Valley Rd crossing.															
29.4	Canford^{e}	Apr 1907 to Oct 1957	Small freight/passenger shelter.	Unknown.^{d}	Apr 1969	Removed by 1968.	c.1906.	Sold, moved away from the track, and slightly modified.	Apr 1907	May 1962	None	None	None	Feb 1916 to Apr 1969. Length 551 metres (1,807 ft)		
30.8	Nicola River: 30-metre (100 ft) Howe truss. Replaced by 34-metre (110 ft) steel pony truss span in 1938. Washed out embankment at west end from 1948 flood replaced by 12-bent pile trestle, and later by 7-bent pile trestle and fill. Adjacent to Spius Creek mouth. Commonly known as Petit Creek. Vincent Petit settled in early 1870s.															
33.7	Nicola River: 30-metre (100 ft) Howe truss. Replaced by 30-metre (100 ft) steel pony truss span in 1938.															
	In 1963, a westbound passenger train killed a person sleeping on the track.															
34.8	Ten Mile (Guichon) Creek: 18-metre (60 ft) Howe truss. Replaced by 20-metre (65 ft 4 in) steel half deck plate girder span in 1939.															

^a . Mileages are 1931–1961, measured from the Spences Bridge Station building.
^b . Unless specified otherwise, infrastructure detail is c.1931.
^c . Named for the Nicola Valley Lumber Co sawmill built in 1908, destroyed by fire c.1909, and rebuilt in 1911.
^d . Station erected on the south side of the main line about 400 metres (0.25 mi) east of Sunshine Valley Rd crossing.
^e . In 1903, the settlement was named after Canford, Dorset.

CP Infrastructure and incidents for Coyle–Coutlee
Mile^{a}	Place	Passenger Service	Station Building				Section House		Section Crew		Storage Capacity		Engine House	Track		Ref.
Mile^{a}	Place	Passenger Service	Type	Built	Closed	Comments	Built	Comments	From	To	Water Tank	Coal Chute	Engine House	Passing	Other	Ref.
35.0	Coyle^{d}	Apr 1907 to Oct 1957	Small passenger shelter.	Unknown.^{c}	Jul 1990		1925.^{c}	Gone by 1960s.	c.1912	After 1965	None	None	None	None		
35.8	In 1949, 8 loaded cattle cars ran away from Merritt. The chasing locomotive derailed some cars on trying to couple east of the Coyle siding switch. The brakeman on the pilot locomotive was killed. An eastbound train hit the remainder west of the switch, derailing the locomotive. A large number of cattle were killed.															
36.2	In 1974, a westbound freight train killed two teenagers sleeping on the track.															

^a . Mileages are 1931–1961, measured from the Spences Bridge Station building.
^b . Unless specified otherwise, infrastructure detail is c.1931.
^c . Near the southern fork of Coyle Rd, the station was erected on the northeast side of the main line and the section house erected on the southwest side.
^d . Area called Lower Nicola. Station opened as Woodward, prior to rename within a year.

CP Infrastructure and incidents for Coutlee–Merritt
Mile^{a}	Place	Passenger Service	Station Building				Section House		Section Crew		Storage Capacity		Engine House	Track		Ref.
Mile^{a}	Place	Passenger Service	Type	Built	Closed	Comments	Built	Comments	From	To	Water Tank	Coal Chute	Engine House	Passing	Other	Ref.
37.7	Coutlee^{d}	Apr 1907 to Oct 1957	Small passenger shelter.	Unknown.^{c}	Apr 1965		None		N/A	N/A	None	None	None	Feb 1916 to Apr 1965. Length 227 metres (746 ft)		
39.0	Nicola River: 26-metre (84 ft) Howe truss. Replaced by 26-metre (85 ft 7 in) steel through plate girder span in 1939.															

^a . Mileages are 1931–1961, measured from the Spences Bridge Station building.
^b . Unless specified otherwise, infrastructure detail is c.1931.
^c . Station erected on the southwest side of the main line.
^d . In 1873, Alexander Coutlee pre-empted and built a house. In the early 1880s, he built a hotel, store and warehouse.

CP Infrastructure and incidents for Merritt–Nicola
Mile^{a}	Place	Passenger Service	Station Building				Section House		Section Crew		Storage Capacity		Engine House	Track		Ref.
Mile^{a}	Place	Passenger Service	Type	Built	Closed	Comments	Built	Comments	From	To	Water Tank	Coal Chute	Engine House	Passing	Other	Ref.
39.8	Merritt	Apr 1907 to Oct 1957	Unknown	1909^{c} ^{d}	Jul 1990	Replaced in 1912. Removed c.1995 to a Canford farm.	On northeast leg of the wye.^{c}	Removed c.1987.	Jun 1915	May 1989	180,000-litre; 48,000-US-gallon (40,000 imp gal) enclosed tank. After 1953, used for diesel emergency.	None	None		wye^{e}	
	In 1910, two loaded coal cars derailed and tipped.															
	In 1916, an eastbound silk train, carrying $1.25 million of silk, crashed head on into a stationary logging train, when the switch had been incorrectly left set for the Nicola spur. Both locomotives derailed and sustained serious damage.															
47.0	Nicola															

^a . Mileages are 1931–1961, measured from the Spences Bridge Station building.
^b . Unless specified otherwise, infrastructure detail is c.1931.
^c . Station and section house erected on the northeast side of the main line.
^d . Station existed in the middle of the Coldwater, Coutlee, Voigt, and Garcia block.
^e . Wye existed in the middle of the Coldwater, Coutlee, Garcia, and Tutill block. Southeast leg imprint remains visible. Tails: west to Spences Bridge, south to Brodie, and east to Nicola. The wye was used primarily to turn locomotives.

=== Extension ===
Merritt–Brookmere

== Commercial coal mining ==
In 1906 Coal Gulley, one of the first coal companies to begin production, was taken over by Nicola Valley Coal and Coke Co (NVC). That year, NVC, Coldwater Coal Co, and Diamond Vale Coal and Iron Mines, began drilling on their holdings. NVC founded the Middlesboro Collieries (about 1.6 kilometres (1 mi) southwest of Merritt). Diamond Vale was in the northeast of the Merritt coalfield (about 1 kilometre (0.6 mi) east of Merritt). The Coldwater River formed the boundary between the Middlesboro and the Diamond Vale properties.

While the railway infrastructure was being built, the mining companies prepared for production. The first carload of coal came up out of the NVC mine in January 1907, but the first train load shipped out was that June. Middlesboro, the largest mine in the valley, used coal cutting machines. The coal was loaded onto 1,400-kilogram (3,000 lb) capacity cars, which were brought to the surface by mules or horses, or up very steep slopes by steel cable and hoist.

In May 1908, NVC chartered a train to bring a hundred of Vancouver's most influential businessmen to inspect the Middlesboro operation. By 1909, NVC was supplying fuel for the city of Kamloops and CP steam locomotives. Most of the coal produced was for railway use.

Exhausted coal seams in existing mines decreased production in the late 1920s. The Great Depression reduced demand in the 1930s. On the spur crossing the river, the replacement of a wooden bridge with a steel one in 1938 indicated confidence in the mining future.

During World War II, a federal subsidy to coal producers kept prices affordable for consumers. When the subsidy was withdrawn in 1944, Middlesboro Collieries closed permanently. Over the decades, the company produced 124,150 tonnes (136,852 short tons) of coal, and Diamond Vale (closed in 1945) produced 42,087 tonnes (46,393 short tons). At the time, the replacing of coal-burning locomotives with diesel ones severely reduced demand.

In 1946, Gerard and Associates bought the Middlesboro Mining Co, renaming it the Coldwater Coal Co. The mine finally closed in 1963. Only a fraction of coal reserves were recovered during the five decades of mining.

== Railway operation and demise ==
In November 1915, the Kettle Valley Railway (KV) took over the management of the line, and coal shipments continued as the primary traffic. During 1916–1959, blockages on the KV Coquihalla segment or in the lower Fraser Canyon created bursts of activity when trains temporarily diverted via Merritt. In October 1957, passenger service (provided by mixed trains) ended. When the Coquihalla track closed in late 1959, trains rerouted via Merritt but stopped at no stations officially, but unofficial stops between Meritt and Spences Bridge were not uncommon.

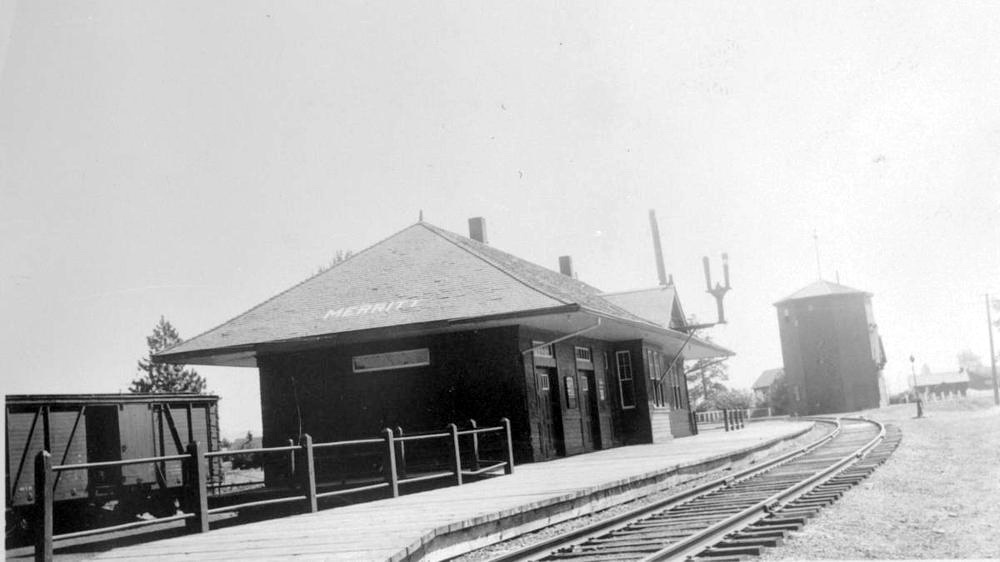
Train Station, Merritt, 1940

The freight crew base moved from Brookmere to Merrit in 1966, where it remained until 1985. The Merritt station freight revenue exceeded $6 million annually during the 1970s. Freight comprised lumber and chips from the mills, equipment for industry and ranches, and copper and iron from Coyle. The spur to Nicola was abandoned in 1979 and the rails lifted in 1980.

After Penticton station closed in 1985, an additional crew was based at Merritt to handle the three times weekly service to Princeton, Penticton and Okanagan Falls. The final train from Penticton was March 1989 and from Princeton was in April. The final trip to Spences Bridge was that May. The rails were lifted in 1991 and 1992. The province purchased the right-of-way in 1995 and returned the parts through the reserves to First Nations.

== Rail trail ==
Around 2019, plans were made to rehabilitate the rail bed toward Spences Bridge and Brookmere. However, when the 2021 flood took out the bridges and most of the rail bed, interest in the proposal evaporated. The first step to revive the project was completion of the short Merritt–Coutlee leg in 2024. Also after the flood destroyed sections of highway 8 a vehicle bridge has been installed where a former railway bridge was and a dirt road constructed along the former rail alignment to re-route traffic around a washed out section of the highway.
