= Sir David William Smith, 1st Baronet =

Canadian politician

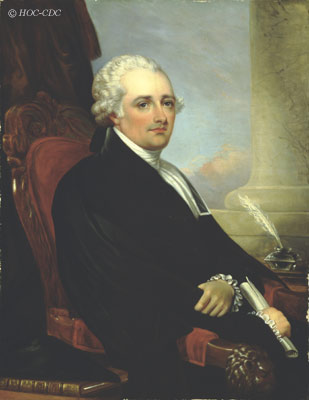

Surveyor General of Upper Canada
- In office 1798–1804
- Preceded by: Samuel Holland
- Succeeded by: Thomas Ridout and William Chewett

Personal details
- Born: September 4, 1764 Salisbury, England
- Died: May 9, 1837 (aged 72) Alnwick, Northumberland
- Occupation: Army officer

Sir David William Smith, 1st Baronet (September 4, 1764 – May 9, 1837) was a soldier and political figure in Upper Canada.

He was born in Salisbury, England in 1764. He was the only son of Colonel John Smith (d.1795) and his wife Anne, daughter of William Waylen of Rowde Hill and Devizes, Wiltshire. He joined his father's regiment, the 5th Regiment of Foot, as an ensign in 1779. He married his first wife in 1788 and rejoined the regiment under his father's command at Detroit in 1790. He served on the land board in the Hesse District in 1791 and 1792. Lieutenant Governor John Graves Simcoe made him acting deputy surveyor general in 1792. He was appointed surveyor general of Upper Canada in 1798.

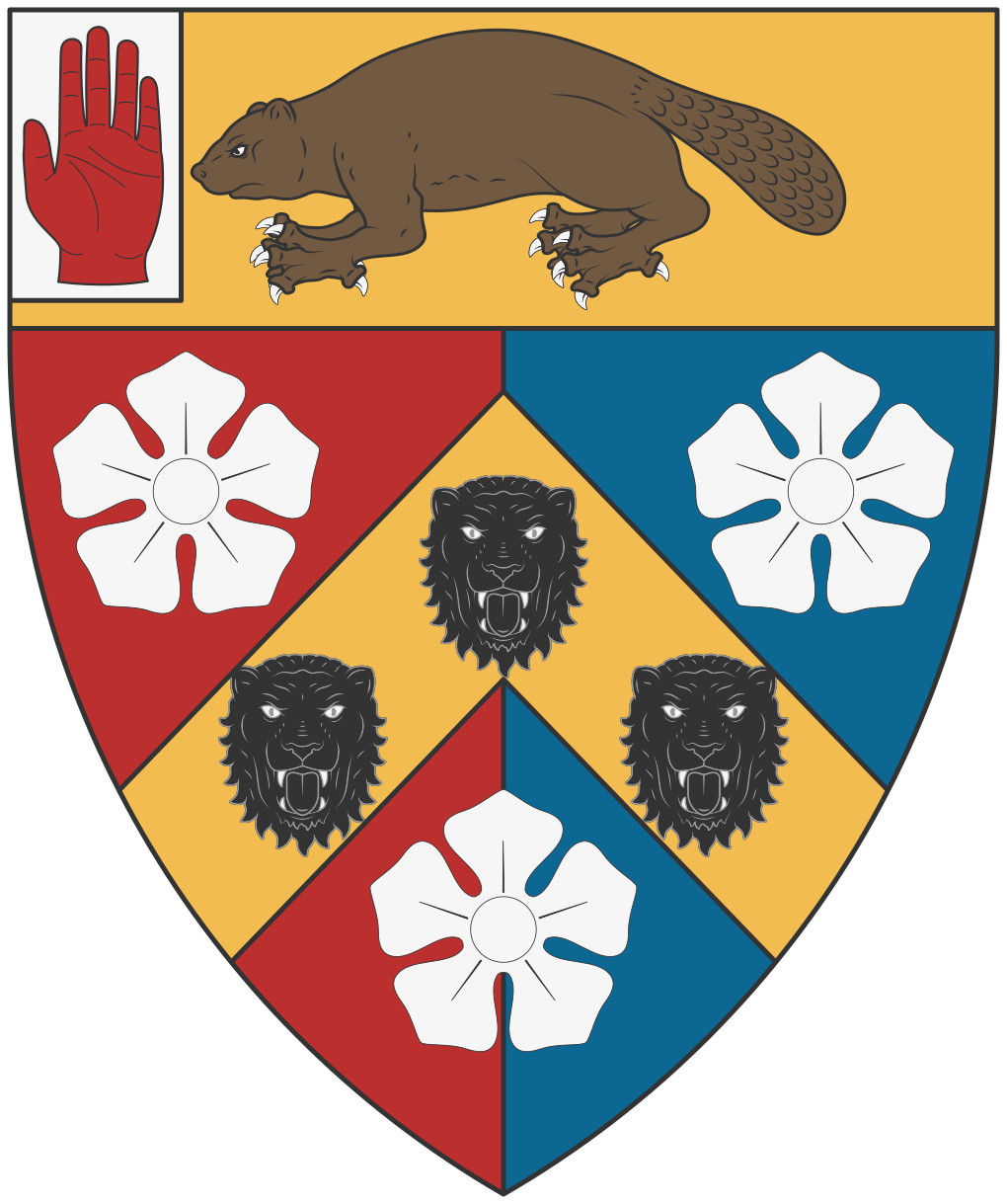
The coat of arms of Sir David Smith

In 1792, he was elected to the 1st Parliament of Upper Canada representing Suffolk & Essex. Although there were no other candidates, Smith authorized 200 pounds be spent to entertain electors on voting day. A slaveowner, he opposed the 1793 Act Against Slavery passed by the 1st Parliament of Upper Canada. In 1796, he was elected in the 3rd riding of Lincoln. He became a member of the Executive Council of Upper Canada in 1796. In 1800, he was elected again to the Legislative Assembly representing Norfolk, Oxford & Middlesex. Smith was speaker for the Legislative Assembly from 1796 to 1801.

Smith acquired 20,000 acres of land in Ontario and owned the park lot which contained the Moss Park estate. He actually owned half of the original land that contained the original city of Toronto. He wrote, “A Short Topographical Description of His Majesty's Province of Upper Canada in North America, to which is annexed a Provincial Gazetteer.” The original work was compiled at the request of Simcoe and republished in London in 1813.

In 1802, he returned to England and, in 1804, resigned from his appointments in Upper Canada. He began a second career as property manager for the Duke of Northumberland. He was made a baronet in 1821. He died near Alnwick, Northumberland in 1837.

Preceded by John McDonell	Speaker of the Legislative Assembly of Upper Canada; 1796–1800	Succeeded by Samuel Street

Preceded by Samuel Street	Speaker of the Legislative Assembly of Upper Canada; 1801–1804	Succeeded by Alexander Macdonell
Baronetage of the United Kingdom
New creation	Baronet (of Pickering); 1821–1837	Extinct
Preceded by D'Oyly baronets	Smith baronets of Pickering, Canada; 30 August 1821	Succeeded by Cooper baronets

== Arms ==
Coat of arms of Sir David-William Smith, Baronet
Adopted 25 July 1821 Crest A sinister hand Gules the wrist encircled by a wreath of oak Or the palm charged with a trefoil Argent Helm Helm of a baronet or knight Escutcheon Per pale Gules and Azure on a chevron Or between three cinquefoils Argent three leopard’s faces Sable, on a chief Or a beaver passant proper Motto PRO REGE ET PATRIA (Latin for 'For King and Country'); CANADA Other elements Red Hand of Ulster baronet badge
