= James Durand Jr. =

Merchant and politician in Upper Canada and Canada West

James Durand (1799–1872) was a merchant and political figure in Upper Canada and Canada West.

He was born in London, England, the son of James Durand. His brother was named Charles Morrison Durand. He represented Halton County in the 12th Parliament of Upper Canada and the electoral district of Halton West in the 1st Parliament of the Province of Canada. He also served in the Gore militia. Durand died in Kingston in 1872.

Durand was a strong supporter of the Reform movement. In the first Parliament of the Province of Canada, he voted against the principle of the union of the two Canadas, and was considered an "ultra" Reformer. He consistently voted with Robert Baldwin, the leader of the ultra-Reformers in the Assembly, and was an opponent of the Governor General, Lord Sydenham.

Durand was defeated in the general election of 1844 and retired from politics.

== See also ==
- Becoming Prominent: Leadership in Upper Canada, 1791-1841, J.K. Johnson (1989)
