= Thomas Clark (Upper Canada) =

Thomas Clark (Unknown – October 6, 1835) was a businessman and political figure in Upper Canada.

He was born in Scotland and came to Upper Canada in 1791 to seek employment with his cousin, Robert Hamilton. In 1796, he opened a store in Queenston. He then formed a partnership with Samuel Street to transport goods around Niagara Falls. He owned docks and storage facilities at Queenston, Chippawa and Fort Erie. In 1800, when Street left the partnership, he formed a new partnership with Robert Nichol transporting and trading in goods which lasted until 1803. In the same year, he was appointed justice of the peace. Around 1808, he set up several large flour milling complexes with Samuel Street. Besides his partnership with Street, Clark also had an agreement with John Jacob Astor and others for the shipping and sale of flour.

During the War of 1812, he served with distinction as lieutenant-colonel in the Lincoln Militia. After the war, he served on the commission which settled claims for war losses; he was also involved in erecting a monument on Queenston Heights to Major-General Isaac Brock. Some of his businesses were destroyed by the Americans during the war.

In 1815, he became a member of the Legislative Council of Upper Canada. Clark initially supported Robert Gourlay, especially since he was interested in having the restrictions regarding sale of lands to Americans lifted; however, when Gourlay fell into disfavour with the administration, Clark was quick to voice his disapproval of Gourlay. As a land speculator, he also favoured a revision of the policy regarding taxes on uncultivated lands. In 1821, he was selected to a commission to establish a new agreement for sharing revenues with Lower Canada. He also served on commissions charged with improving navigation within the province.

He died at Niagara Falls in 1835.

Clark's former home, Oak Hall, is now the headquarters for the Niagara Parks Commission.
