= Richard Pierpoint =

Senegalese-born farmer and soldier

Personal details
- Born: 1744 Bundu, Guinea
- Died: 1838 (aged 93–94) Upper Canada
- Profession: Farmer and soldier

Richard Pierpoint (c. 1744 – c. 1837) was a Bundu-born farmer and soldier. Brought as a slave to British North America via the Atlantic slave trade, he fought as a Black Loyalist in the American Revolutionary War. After the war, he settled in a Black community in Upper Canada, where he was given some land. He also participated in the War of 1812. Pierpoint was regarded within the Black community of Upper Canada as a griot, a traditional West African storyteller and oral historian.

== Butler's Rangers ==
Richard Pierpoint was born about 1744 in Bundu in what is now Senegal. When he was about sixteen, he was captured and sold into slavery. Surviving the Middle Passage across the Atlantic Ocean, Pierpoint was sold to a military officer in British North America named Pierpoint, probably in one of the New England Colonies. Richard Pierpoint acted as his personal servant.

In 1776, with the outbreak of the American Revolutionary War, many enslaved African Americans were offered freedom in exchange for fighting on the side of the British. By at least 1780, Pierpoint was one of about a dozen Black people fighting with the Butler's Rangers regiment. Some members of the regiment were formerly enslaved Black people who enlisted as non-combatant laborers or sappers. The total number of black soldiers in Butler's Rangers is unknown.

== Pierpoint's Settlement ==
Following the British defeat, the Rangers settled in Niagara. Among the Loyalists who came to Upper Canada (where they were given the name United Empire Loyalists) were several hundred Blacks (the "Black Loyalists"). Blacks represented about 10% of the total Loyalist emigration. Communities such as Buxton and the Queen's Bush Settlement were examples of how Blacks created communities and helped develop many of the communities in Southern Ontario. Blacks were entitled to the same proportion of land as their fellow Loyalists only if they fought for the British as a freeman. Others of African descent were not included as Loyalists.

In 1788, Pierpoint was located on 200 acres (0.81 km^{2}) of land in present-day St. Catharines. Loyalists first settled in the City of St. Catharines in the 1780s. Early histories credit Serjeant Jacob Dittrick and Private John Hainer, formerly of Butler's Rangers, among the first to come to the area, taking up their Crown Patents where Dick's Creek and 12 Mile Creek merge, now the city center of St. Catharines. Although never documented, some St. Catharines' historians have concluded that Dick's Creek was named after Richard Pierpoint, a Black Loyalist.

Under normal circumstances, a private would have only received a grant of 100 acres (0.40 km^{2}), so the reason for the additional 100 acres (0.40 km^{2}) of the grant is open to speculation. His commanding officer John Butler may have considered him to have been an NCO (non-commissioned officer), such men being entitled to 200 acres (0.81 km^{2}). Additionally, he might have been considered a United Empire Loyalist and thereby entitled to an additional 100 acres (0.40 km^{2}). Alternatively, he may have had a family with him, each family member being allotted an additional 50 acres (200,000 m^{2}). There is some evidence that Pierpoint did not arrive alone as victualling records from 1786 indicate that a woman accompanied him. Pierpoint didn't appear on either an assessment or census and no documentary evidence exists to explain the situation. Conversely, his participation in the Petition of Free Negroes and subsequent sale or abandonment of his grant suggests he may have been single, at least by 1794.

In 1794 Pierpont signed the Petition of Free Negroes to Lieutenant Governor John Graves Simcoe requesting that freed Blacks who had served as soldiers be given land grants adjacent to each other so that the former comrades could help each other with land clearing as many lacked the large families necessary to clear the land on their own. The Petition was read by the Executive Council of Upper Canada Government on July 8, 1794, and dismissed. Pierpoint subsequently abandoned or sold his grant and supported himself as a laborer.

== War of 1812 ==
Following the outbreak of the War of 1812, Pierpoint proposed to organize a Corps of Men of Colour on the Niagara frontier. His offer was refused, but a small Black corps was raised locally by a white officer, Jordan tavern-owner Robert Runchey. Pierpoint volunteered immediately for Captain Runchey's Company of Coloured Men even though he was in his sixties. The corps served with distinction at the Battle of Queenston Heights, the siege of Fort George, and the Battle of Lundy's Lane as well as other engagements. They were also instrumental in the construction of Fort Mississauga. The corps was used for labor and garrison duty for the remainder of the war.

== Petition ==
Pierpoint's unit was honorably disbanded in 1815. As a veteran, Pierpoint was entitled to a 100-acre grant of old-growth forest. In his late 70s, in 1821, Pierpoint petitioned Lieutenant Governor Maitland for passage back to his homeland in Senegal instead of the land grant. A certificate from the Adjutant General Nathaniel Coffin was attached.

The Petition of Richard Pierpoint, now of the Town of Niagara, a Man of Colour, a native of Africa, and an inhabitant of this Province since the year 1780.

Most humbly showeth,

That Your Excellency's Petitioner is a native of Bondu in Africa; that at the age of Sixteen Years he was made a Prisoner and sold as a Slave; that he was conveyed [transported] to America about the year 1760, and sold to a British officer; that he served his Majesty King George III during the American Revolutionary War in the Corps called Butler's Rangers; and again during the late American War in a Corps of Colour raised on the Niagara Frontier.

That Your Excellency's Petitioner is now old and without property; that he finds it difficult to obtain a livelihood by his labour; that he is above all things desirous to return to his native Country; that His Majesty's Government be graciously pleased to grant him any relief, he wishes it may be by affording him the means to proceed to England and from thence to a Settlement near the Gambia or Senegal Rivers, from whence he could return to Bondu ...

York Upper Canada
21st July 1821

His request was denied, and instead, Pierpoint and several other Coloured Corps veterans were given land grants in Garafraxa, just outside present-day Fergus.

Grant to Richard Pierpoint of the Township of Grantham in the County of Lincoln in the Niagara District, farmer -- as a private in the Coloured Corps under Captain Runchey and Lieutenant Robertson -- the easterly half of Lot No. 6 in the 1st Concession of the Township of Garafraxa -- containing one hundred acres.

A "land ticket" was issued to him on July 30, 1822. Pierpoint would only get full ownership of the plot once he had cleared at least 5 acres (20,000 m^{2}) of trees, cleared a road to the plot, and built a house:

Location Ticket grant on fulfilment of settling duties req'd by Order in Council of 20 Oct. 1818: to clear and fence 5 acres [20,000 m^{2}] for every 100 acres [0.40 km^{2}] granted; to erect a dwelling house of 16 by 20 feet [4.9 by 6.1 m]; to clear one half of the Road in front of each lot. The whole to be performed within two years from the date of the ticket. Note The Settlement duty performed as attested & admitted. 15 Sept. 1826. Sig. T. Ridout.

The farm was probably a settlement for many Black settlers, but the exact number is unknown. Very few records were left, and even orally transmitted history is limited.

Pierpoint died sometime before September 1838, leaving no family or heirs. It is not known where he was buried. His will left the Garafraxa property to Lemuel Brown. Brown, who lived in the Guelph area at the time of Pierpoint's death, sold the land to the neighboring farmer.

== Sources ==
- Meyler, David and Peter (1999). A Stolen Life: Searching for Richard Pierpoint. Toronto: Natural heritage Books. ISBN 1-896219-55-1.
