= William Hamilton Merritt =

Canadian businessman and politician (1792–1862)

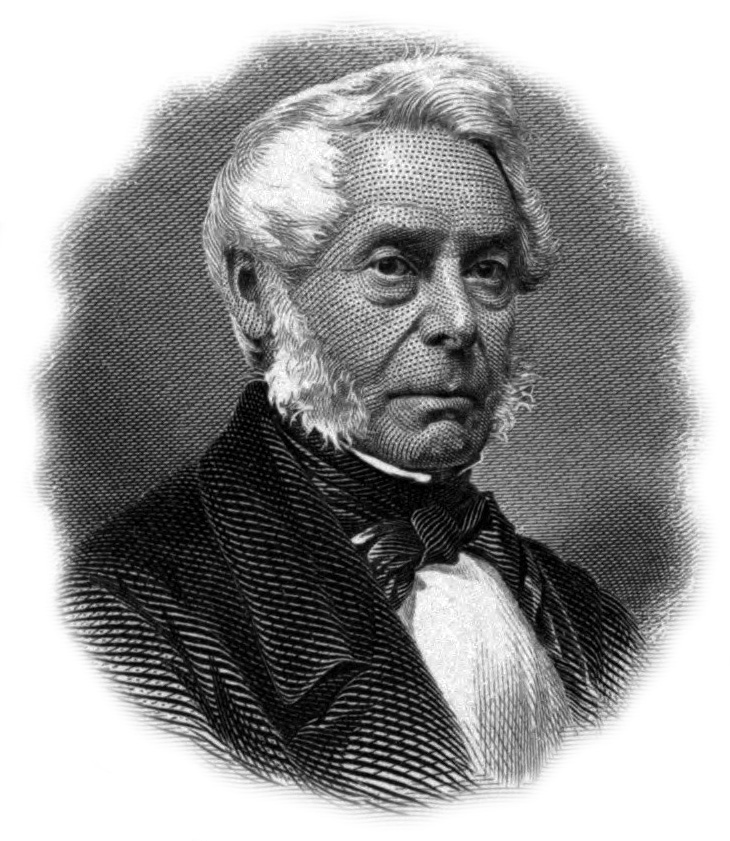

Member of the Legislative Assembly of Upper Canada for Haldimand County
- In office 1832–1841
- Preceded by: John Warren
- Succeeded by: Position abolished

Member of the Legislative Assembly of the Province of Canada for Lincoln North
- In office 1841–1860
- Preceded by: New position

Member of the Legislative Council of the Province of Canada for Niagara
- In office 1860–1862
- Preceded by: New position
- Succeeded by: James G. Currie

Personal details
- Born: July 3, 1793 Bedford, New York, U.S.
- Died: July 5, 1862 (aged 69) Cornwall Canal
- Resting place: Victoria Lawn Cemetery, St. Catharines, Ontario
- Spouse: Catharine Prendergast
- Children: Four sons and two daughters, including Thomas Rodman Merritt, M.P. (son); William Hamilton Merritt III (grandson)
- Occupation: Landowner, businessman

Military service
- Allegiance: Britain
- Branch/service: Upper Canada militia
- Unit: 2nd Lincoln Militia
- Battles/wars: War of 1812: Battle of Queenston Heights; Battle of Ball's Farm; Battle of Lundy's Lane

William Hamilton Merritt (July 3, 1793 – July 5, 1862) was a businessman and politician in the Niagara Peninsula of Upper Canada in the early 19th century. Although he was born in the United States, his family was Loyalist and eventually settled in Upper Canada. Merritt fought in the War of 1812, was captured by the invading American forces, and held as a prisoner of war. After the war, he returned to the Niagara region and began a career in business. He was one of the founders of the Welland Canal. He was a supporter of the Abolitionist cause to end slavery in the U.S., and of the settlement of escaped slaves in St. Catharines.

== Family and early life ==
Merritt was born in Bedford in Westchester County, New York, on July 3, 1793. His father, Thomas, fought as a United Empire Loyalist in the American Revolutionary War. After the revolution, the family resided in New Brunswick before returning to the U.S. In 1795, they moved to Upper Canada, settling on the Niagara Peninsula on the Twelve Mile Creek. Merritt attended school in Ancaster and Niagara, studying mathematics and field surveying. Afterwards, he became a partner in a store at Shipman's Corners (now St. Catharines).

== War of 1812 ==
The Battle of Lundy's Lane, where Merritt was captured by the Americans

Just before the War of 1812, he sold his interest in the store and returned to his family's 200-acre (81 ha) farm on the creek. During the war, he joined the Second Lincoln Militia, stationed at Chippawa. He was a captain and leader of the volunteer dragoons throughout the war. During constant patrols along the Niagara River, an idea came to him for a canal to by-pass the Niagara Falls. He was captured during Battle of Lundy's Lane in July 1814 and held prisoner of war in Massachusetts until March 1815. After his release, while travelling back to Upper Canada, he stopped in Mayville, New York, to marry Catharine Prendergast, whose family had lived in St. Catharines before the war.

== Business ventures ==
After the war, Merritt purchased 25 acres (10 ha) at Shipman's Corners, where he built a house and a store. He also sold goods in Niagara (now Niagara-on-the-Lake) and Queenston. In 1816, he bought a rundown sawmill on the Twelve Mile Creek, and added a grist mill and a store. His property had a salt spring, and Merritt began to manufacture salt at a time when it was still expensive.

The water levels in the creek varied considerably, creating difficulties for Merritt and his mill. In 1818, when the flow was especially low, Merritt pursued the idea of bringing water to his mills from the Chippawa Creek. The idea of a canal across the Niagara Peninsula had been examined before, as early as 1799, but at that time the route for shipping materials in order to bypass Niagara Falls still occurred along a portage road. However, it is Merritt, and indirectly the lack of water for his mills, that is credited with realizing the idea.

== Welland Canal ==
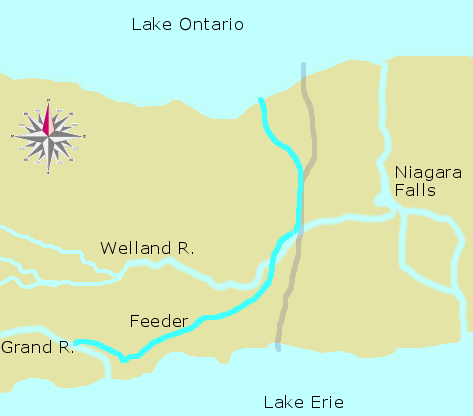
The Welland Canal (bright blue) as completed in 1829, with the present-day canal (pale grey)

On July 4, 1818, Merritt organized a meeting in St. Catharines. The outcome was a petition sent to the Upper Canada Legislature to provide for construction of a canal between the Twelve Mile Creek and Chippawa Creek. This early proposal was primarily to provide additional water supplies for mills. However, the plan rapidly expanded, to include plans for a canal to allow boats to cross the Niagara Escarpment and travel between Lake Erie and Lake Ontario.

This expanded version of the canal would allow the trade from the upper Great Lakes to transit directly to Lake Ontario, rather than having to be portaged across the Niagara peninsula, and then continue on to Montreal down the St. Lawrence. The canal would also provide competition for the planned Erie Canal, which potentially could siphon off the trade from the upper Great Lakes to New York. Although he first conceived the canal in 1818, his own personal business troubles in a general depression delayed his ability to work on the proposal.

In 1823, Merritt began campaigning in earnest for the canal. He had hoped that the government of Upper Canada would build the canal as a public work, but initial discussions indicated that the government was only interested in a canal built for defence purposes, not for commercial shipping. Merritt concluded that the canal would have to be built by a private company, although he hoped with government assistance. He organised public meetings to garner support, issued a circular outlining the proposal, and lobbied the provincial government. On January 19, 1824, an act of the Legislature formed the Welland Canal Company, with a capitalization of £40,000.

Merritt was the first general manager for the newly chartered company. As part of his fundraising duties, he travelled extensively, in Upper Canada and Lower Canada, and also to the United States and Great Britain. He recruited Alfred Barrett, who had worked on the Erie Canal, as the chief engineer on the project. He was successful in raising the money, in part with a substantial investment from an American entrepreneur, John B. Yates.

Construction on the Welland Canal began on November 30, 1824, and was completed exactly five years later, on November 30, 1829. Merritt was a passenger on the first ship that made the entire transit, departing from Lake Ontario on November 30, 1829, and arriving at Buffalo, New York on December 2, 1829.

== Political career ==
In 1832, Merritt was elected to the Legislative Assembly of Upper Canada in a by-election, representing Haldimand County. He would continue in elected office until his death, thirty years later. He was not a strong partisan. His main interest in being elected was to be able to work for transportation improvements, such as canals to improve navigation on the St. Lawrence River. He also favoured developing the new transportation system, railways, and proposed a rail link between Montreal and the Maritimes. He also pushed for the first steel suspension bridge over the Niagara River. Merritt supported free trade policies to increase trade with the United States. At the same time, he favoured reducing government expenditures and services. He began as a moderate supporter of the Compact Tories but gradually moved towards the Reform movement.

In 1841, Upper Canada and Lower Canada were united in the Province of Canada. Merritt was elected to the new Legislative Assembly of the Province of Canada for Lincoln North as a Reformer. On the first major vote of the first session, he voted in support of the union of the Canadas, breaking with Baldwin. Thereafter, he voted consistently with Baldwin.

In 1843, there was a political crisis between the Governor-General, Sir Charles Metcalfe, and the Lafontaine-Baldwin ministry, which resulted in Baldwin and Lafontaine resigning. The Governor-General tried to pull together a new ministry which would attract moderates from all political views, provided they did not push for responsible government. Metcalfe and the leader of the moderate Tories, Henry Draper, both considered that Merritt's participation would be essential, given his broad political support in the Niagara region and his breadth of knowledge about transportation issues. However, Merritt declined Draper's invitation to join the new ministry. He had disagreed with Baldwin's decision to resign office, but he still considered himself a Baldwin supporter.

In 1860, he was elected to the Legislative Council in the Niagara Division. Merritt was also a supporter of the abolitionist cause to end slavery in the United States, helping indirectly to make St. Catharines a haven for escaped slaves and anti- slavery activism. In the early 1840s, he financed the establishment of both a Methodist (the second version still stands) and a Baptist church for Black refugees, and sold lots to the refugees themselves at below market prices, according to Merritt's son, a city councilor, successfully pushed the city to compensate the so-called "Negro Village" that flourished around the churches, after many buildings were burned during an anti-Black riot in 1853.

== Death ==
Merritt died in 1862 aboard a ship in the Cornwall Canal. He is buried at the Victoria Lawn cemetery in St. Catharines, Ont.

One of his sons, Thomas Rodman Merritt, was later a member of the Canadian House of Commons. His grandson, William Hamilton Merritt III was involved in railway construction in British Columbia, and married the only daughter of Robert Simpson, the founder of the Simpsons department store chain.

== Legacy ==
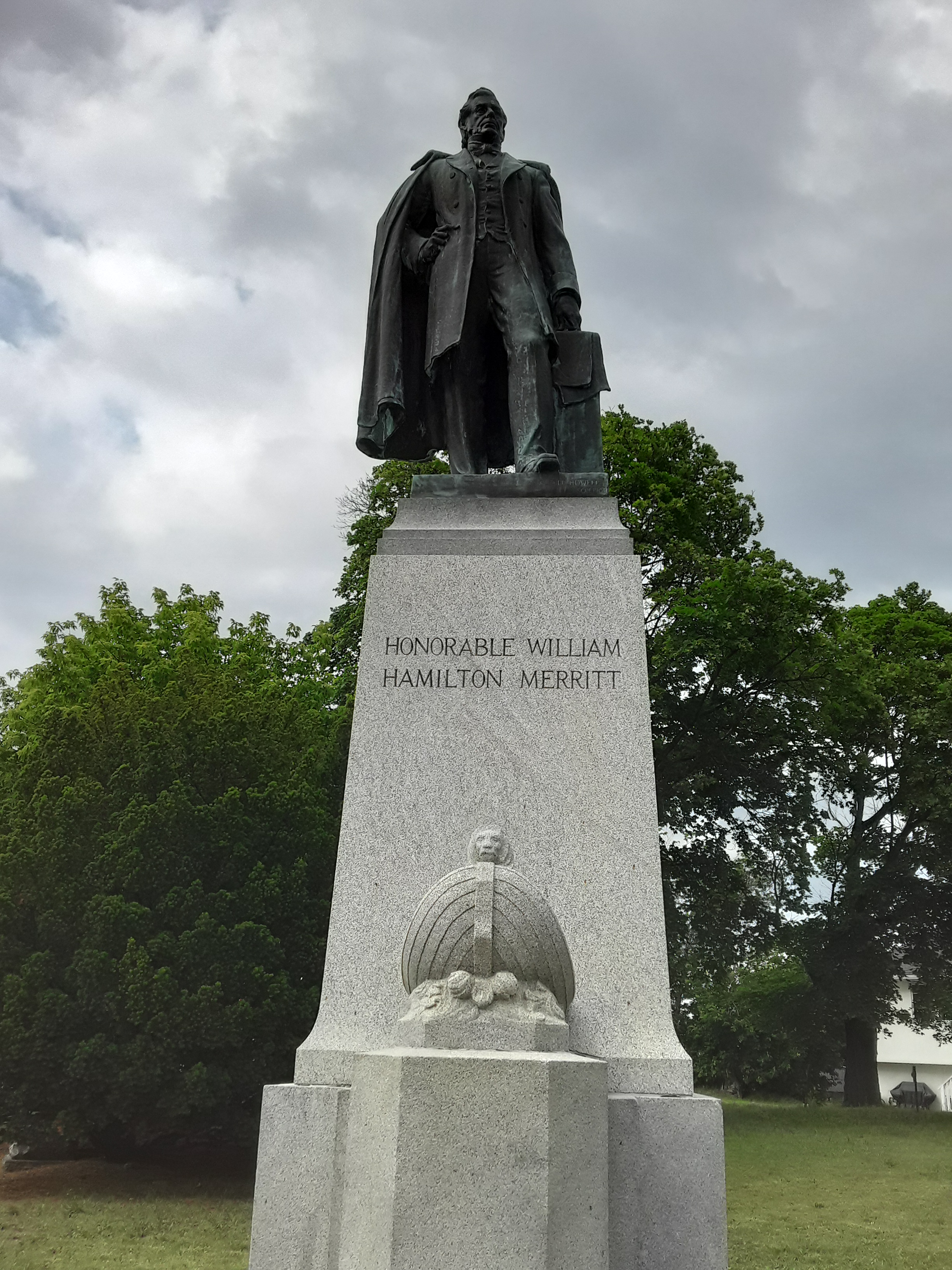
A statue depicting William Hamilton Merritt in St. Catharines, Ontario, Canada.

- The community Merritton in St. Catharines is named after Merrit.
- In 1844, the residents of Aqueduct, a community on the Welland Canal, renamed their village Merrittsville to acknowledge the role of William Hamilton Merritt's enterprise in founding the hamlet (Merritsville is now part of Welland).
- The road connecting Merrittsville to (Beaverdams) Thorold is named Merrittville Highway.
- In 1974, Merritt was designated as a National Historic Person by the federal government. The plaque setting out the designation is located at Lock # 3 on the Welland Canal in St. Catharines.

== See also ==
- Welland Canal
