= Canadian Defence League =

The Canadian Defence League was an organization that advocated military training for all men in Canada. It was founded in 1909, at the suggestion of William Hamilton Merritt III, and was formally inaugurated on September 10, 1910, in Toronto. The League operated from 1910 to March 1914, around the outbreak of World War I. Merritt was its president.

Ultimately, the organization favoured universal military service, on the Swiss model. Albert Carman, William Lash Miller, Maurice Hutton, Byron Edmund Walker, Reuben Wells Leonard, and Rufus S. Hudson were among the League's boosters. Many of its members favoured cadet drills in schools.

Desmond Morton argues that the League's efforts in favour of military training "failed miserably only months before the outbreak of war".

== Sources ==
- Berger, Carl (2013). The sense of power : studies in the ideas of Canadian imperialism, 1867–1914 (2d ed.). University of Toronto Press. ISBN 978-1-4426-6897-3. OCLC 852803516.
- Morton, Desmond (May 1978). "The Cadet Movement in the Moment of Canadian Militarism, 1909–1914". Journal of Canadian Studies. 13 (2): 56–68. doi:10.3138/jcs.13.2.56. ISSN 0021-9495. S2CID 151472092.
