= Battle of Ball's Farm =

Military action during the War of 1812

- Part of War of 1812
Date	July 8, 1813
Location	Ball's Farm, Upper Canada
Result	First Nations victory

Belligerents
First Nations; United Kingdom	United States

Commanders and leaders
John Norton; Blackbird; William Hamilton Merritt	Major B. M. Malcom; Lieutenant Eldrige

Strength
140 warriors few regulars	500

Casualties and losses
3 wounded	20 killed 13 captured

The Battle of Ball's Farm took place on July 8, 1813, during The War of 1812. A British and Native force successfully recovered medical supplies they buried on the Chourous farm a few kilometres from Fort George, Ontario. The medicine supplies were buried in the face of an advancing American army. During the recovery an American force of 500 sortied from the occupied Fort George. A small flanking force of 40 was cut off and almost entirely killed or captured.

== Background ==
On May 27, 1813, an American invasion force captured Fort George at the Battle of Fort George and advanced west along the Niagara Peninsula. The British buried large amounts of medical supplies and medicine on the Chourous farm a few kilometres from Fort George. The American advance was halted at the Battle of Stoney Creek. Afterward, the Americans returned to Fort George. After the Battle of Beaver Dams on June 24, 1813, where a large American force was captured, the Americans rarely went more than a 1 mile (1.6 km) from the Fort.

== Action ==
On July 7 a force of 140 natives and a few British soldiers under Captain William Hamilton Merritt located the medical supplies. Nearby was an American piquet that the British had to get rid of. They charged the American scaring him off as intended. The American alerted the nearby fort and a few hundred dragoons rode from the fort forcing the British to retire without a fight. The next morning the natives moved to the nearby woods on the Ball family farm to protect the British as they dug up the supplies. At 8:00 am the medicine was dug up but the natives aroused the attention of the Americans in Fort George. Around five hundred Americans sortied from the fort including a few dragoons under the command of a Major Malcom. In their presence the outnumbered natives retreated to some woods on the Chouros Farm. A force of forty Americans was dispatched to flank the natives. Lieutenant Eldrige volunteered to lead them. The main American force advanced to the woods and a few dragoons charged the natives. They turned back before any damage could be done to either side. The Americans withdrew to the fort. The part under Eldrige took a shortcut to the natives but stumbled right into them. The party was surrounded and intensely fired at, killing half. Only seven escaped the pocket before they surrendered. During the process of surrender Eldrige fired on a native and was executed in return. Twenty Americans were killed and thirteen captured during the affair compared to only three natives wounded. The prisoners were greatly afraid for their life in the natives hand and the British were anxious as well. Captain Merritt swore that if the prisoners were killed he would never again fight with natives. He was able to negotiate possession of the prisoners and none were harmed.

== Sources ==
- Cruikshank, Earnst (1902). The Documentary History of the Campaign Upon the Niagara Frontier in the Year 1813. Welland Ontario: Lundys Lane Historical Society.
- Hannings, Bud (2012). The War of 1812: A Complete Chronology with biographies of 63 General Officers. McFarland and Company Inc. ISBN 9780786463855.
