= Cyrenius Chapin =

Pioneer Physician and Milita Leader

Cyrenius Chapin (February 7, 1769 – February 20, 1838) was an American medical doctor and militia leader in Western New York. He is recognized as the first physician in the Buffalo region, having purchased land in the village of New Amsterdam (now Buffalo, New York) from the Holland Land Company in 1803. Chapin played a significant role during the War of 1812, leading a New York militia in an effort to defend Buffalo from being burned by British forces. He was also a foundational figure in the establishment of several key institutions in Western New York, including the first almshouse, St. Paul's Episcopal Church, the Erie County Medical Society, and the Erie County Agricultural Society. Towards the end of his life, Chapin provided refuge to William Lyon Mackenzie, a Canadian rebel leader involved in the Patriot (Hunter) Wars.

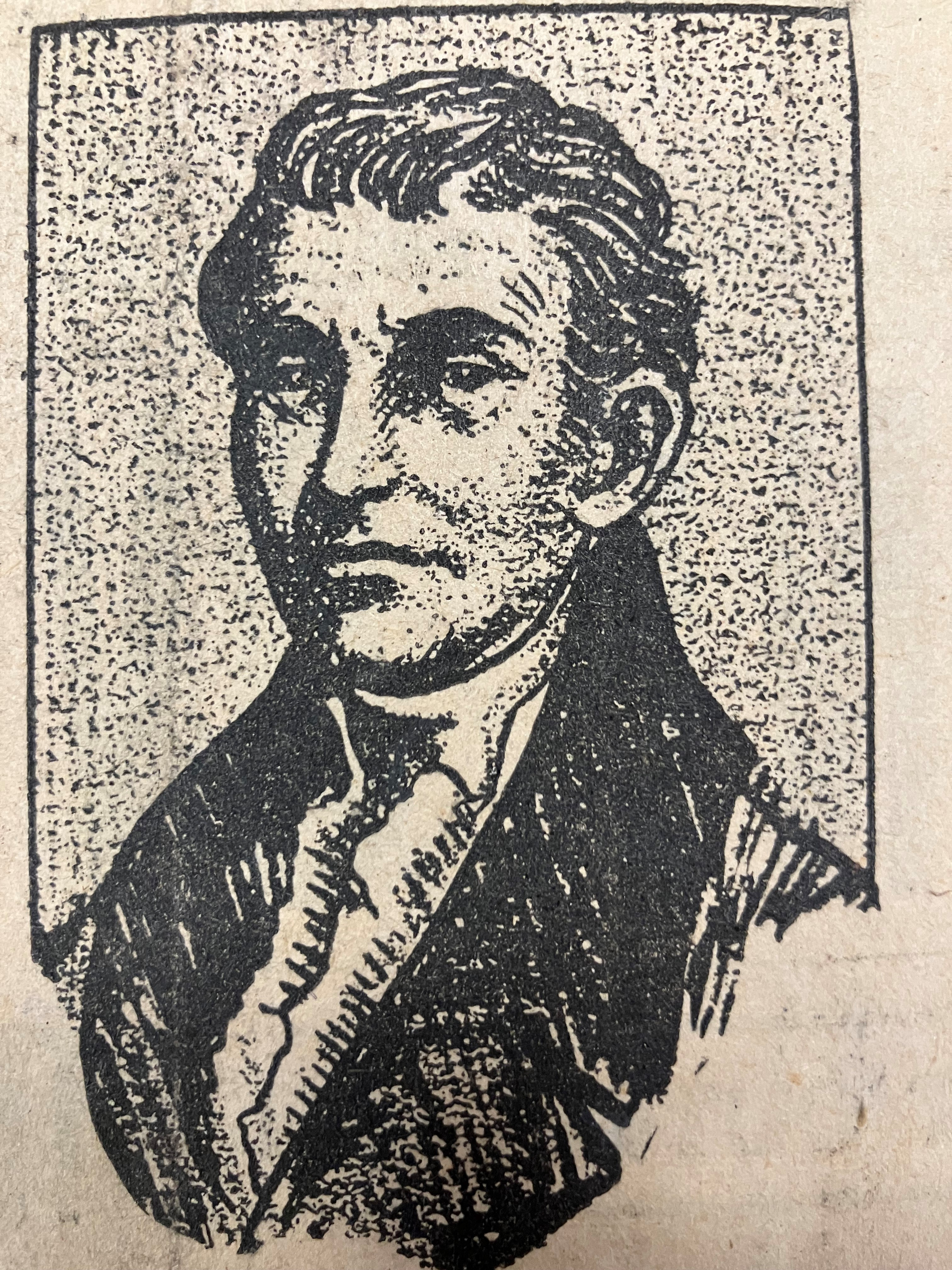

== Early life ==
Born on February 7, 1769, in Bernardstown, Massachusetts, Cyrenius Chapin was the youngest of five children. Cyrenius's great-great-grandfather was Deacon Samuel Chapin, a Puritan who arrived in Massachusetts in 1643. Cyrenius' father, Captain Caleb Chapin (1736–1815), was a Bernardstown farmer who supplemented his income by making and installing mill stones and served in both the French-Indian and the Revolutionary wars. In 1786, Cyrenius accompanied his father when Captain Chapin was ordered to lead a Massachusetts militia during Shays' Rebellion.

== Medical career ==
In 1793, Cyrenius completed his medical training as an apprentice to his eldest brother, Dr. Caleb Chapin. Neither Chapin brother received a formal academic degree. Despite his limited education, Cyrenius later hosted apprentices in his own practice, training several physicians who went on to serve Buffalo. Chapin's patients included the Haudenosaunee leader, Red Jacket, and he devised a surgical technique to restore ear contours after they were torn by trinkets and decorations worn by the Senecas.

== Personal life ==
Cyrenius Chapin married Bernardstown native Sylvia Burnham in 1793. The couple moved to Winhall, Vermont, then on to Sangerfield in Oneida County, New York. Thirty-two-year-old Dr. Cyrenius Chapin first visited New Amsterdam (Buffalo) in 1801 and made an offer to bring 40 of his friends from Oneida County to the Holland Land Company's proposed village on the shore of Lake Erie. Joseph Ellicott, the surveyor and agent for the Holland Land Company, declined Chapin's proposal. In October 1803, once Ellicott completed his plans for the future Buffalo, he sold Dr. Chapin a single lot, Lot 41, Township 11, Range 8 for $346.50. It was Ellicott's first village sale. Limited housing forced the Chapin family to rent a home in Fort Erie, Canada, before completing their own house in New Amsterdam in 1805. Their lot faced Swan Street between Main and Pearl Streets and overlooked Lake Erie, one-half-mile north of the Seneca village on Buffalo Creek. The house was two stories, with a first-floor drugstore and a second-floor office/home and a backyard stable for their horse and buggy.

Cyrenius and Sylvia Chapin had five children. Their first child, Sylvia, was born on February 7, 1796, and died at age 36 on December 1, 1832, as a cholera epidemic swept the United States. The Chapins' second child, Royal, lived only six weeks. Their third child, and only son, was born in 1800. He was named Cyrenius Burnham Chapin and died of unknown causes on April 1, 1811. The Seneca Chief Red Jacket attended the funeral. Their fourth child was born on January 13, 1801. She was named Amelia and died of unknown causes on August 15, 1818. A fifth child, Louise, was born in 1803, married a hardware merchant, Thaddeus Weed, and died on July 20, 1894, at age ninety-one. All family members are now buried in Plot Section 5 of Forest Lawn Cemetery in Buffalo.

== War of 1812 ==
Cyrenius Chapin was a leader of the New York State Federalist party when the War of 1812 was declared by Democratic-Republican President James Madison. He was certain that Canada wanted to join the United States and embraced the idea of ending all British influence in North America. The United States Army was undermanned and forced to rely on local militias for much of the war. Chapin organized a militia of Buffalonians to support America's military efforts on the Niagara Frontier. His group acquired a reputation for attacking anything connected to British power or infrastructure and became known as the Forty Thieves.

=== Battle at Beaver Dams ===
In May 1813, the United States took control of Fort George on the Canadian side of the Niagara River. Chapin's militia was sent on frequent sorties to clear the region of forces sympathetic to the British. The British responded by organizing a base at the Canadian village of Beaver Dams to counter the raids and placed Lieutenant James FitzGibbon in charge. Chapin was ordered to support American lieutenant-colonel Charles G. Boerstler in forcing FitzGibbon out of Beaver Dams. A couple of miles from Beaver Dams, Chapin's scouts discovered FitzGibbon had deployed an ambush. When he warned Boerstler, Chapin was accused of cowardice and Boerstler continued his march directly into FitzGibbon's ambush, forcing an American surrender. Discovering that his American captives included Chapin and his Forty Thieves, FitzGibbon immediately had Chapin and 26 of his men loaded onto two boats to be transported to a British prisoner of war camp in Kingston, Ontario. Guarded by 16 British soldiers, the American prisoners were forced to row the boats. Chapin began entertaining the guards with bawdy stories providing distraction while the rowers brought the boats next to each other. Upon Chapin's signal, the Americans overtook their captors, reversed course, and returned to Fort George by the next morning. Chapin may have unwittingly been responsible for FitzGibbon being well prepared for the battle at Beaver Dams. In the days leading up to the battle, Chapin and several officers had dinner at an inn owned by Laura Secord. The legend of Laura Secord claims she relayed the information she overheard at that dinner to FitzGibbon.

=== Burning of Buffalo ===
In early December 1813, the Americans abandoned their occupation of Fort George on the Canadian side of the Niagara River to concentrate on taking control of the St. Lawrence River. Before leaving, the American General George McClure ordered the burning of the nearby village of Newark, today known as Niagara-on-the-Lake, on December 10, 1813. His order left British/Canadian civilians desperate for shelter, food and supplies. Two weeks later, on December 29, 1813, British soldiers reinforced with Algonquin mercenaries, landed on the American shore north of Buffalo. British General Phineas Riall marched his troops along the Niagara River shoreline, burning every village and farmhouse they encountered. Cyrenius Chapin called upon his Buffalo militia to impede Riall's advance. Far outnumbered, Chapin's men accomplished little more than slow Riall, eventually taking a last stand at the northernmost edge of the Buffalo village. Now, with only five men still at his side, Chapin mounted a used cannon on a makeshift carriage and fired at the British. With a second blast, the makeshift carriage broke apart. Chapin then tied a handkerchief to his sword and marched out to negotiate a surrender. His effort accomplished only a brief pause in the destruction of every home and building in Buffalo. Cyrenius Chapin was taken prisoner a second time and removed to Montreal, where he remained incarcerated until released by the British in September 1814. Following the war, Chapin rebuilt his medical office and home on its original foundation.

== Community work ==
=== Medical Society ===
When the New York State Legislature established a system of physician licensing in 1806, it empowered individual county medical societies to grant applicants licenses after reviewing credentials and conducting an oral exam. When the state legislature organized upstate counties in 1808, Buffalo was placed in Niagara County, and Cyrenius Chapin led a group that organized a medical society for Niagara County in 1811. In 1821, Niagara County was split, and Buffalo was assigned to the new Erie County. Cyrenius Chapin now lead a new county medical society, this one for Erie County. In his inaugural speech as the first president of the Erie County Medical Society, Chapin declared the medical profession "lax in maintaining the rank among the learned professions which it demands" and decried the community's habit of ignoring the physician's bill. "Nonpayment," he said, "is an insult and a hardship, compelling physicians to resort to an immediate collection at the time of service."

=== Agricultural Society ===
Chapin bought several farms in western New York and by 1820 he became interested in the breeding of animals. Employing modern farming methods, Chapin found he could produce surpluses for profitable shipment on the Erie Canal. The New York legislature passed a series of bills to encourage county agricultural societies to advance agriculture and teach modern farming methods. Chapin convened several farm families to establish a Niagara County Agricultural Society in 1820 and then, once the counties split in 1821, convened an Erie County Agricultural Society. Again, he served as the first president of both county societies. In 1820, he also funded and organized the first county fair held in western New York.

== Patriot War ==
By the 1830s, citizens in both Upper and Lower Canada were losing trust in the standard two-tiered legislative structure employed by the British. While both provinces had lower and upper legislative structures, the real power lay with the upper houses whose members were appointed by the British Crown. A newspaper publisher and assemblyman, William Lloyd Mackenzie, organized a revolt commonly referred to as the Patriot War. Mackenzie's citizen army was defeated in a battle just north of Toronto. Mackenzie escaped and five days later (December 11, 1837) appeared in Buffalo in the company of Cyrenius Chapin. Chapin funded and helped organize a Buffalo chapter of the Patriot Society (also called the Hunter Society) that supported Mackenzie's plans for a Canadian invasion from a base camp on a small island in the middle of the Niagara River called Navy Island.

United States president Martin Van Buren sent General Winfred Scott to disperse Mackenzie's forces and Navy Island was evacuated. Mackenzie continued to stir up sympathy for his Canadian revolt from New England to Detroit. Chapin provided support for the Hunter Lodge in Buffalo, eventually planning an invasion of Canada across a frozen Lake Erie for February 1838. Upon learning of the plan, General Scott sent a force to break up the Hunter Lodge advance camp on ice-covered Lake Erie. Chapin is reported to have been among those on the Lake Erie encampment. Following the breakup of the Lake Erie ice encampment, sixty-nine-year-old Chapin took a fever.

== Death ==
Two days after the breakup of the Lake Erie ice camp, on February 20, 1838, Chapin died of pneumonia. He was the last person buried in the 'New Amsterdam' Franklin Square Cemetery, site of today's Erie County Hall, and only a few steps from where he defended Buffalo using the makeshift cannon in 1813. His grave was later moved to Forest Lawn Cemetery. His wife, Sylvia, was awarded the government pension Chapin had received for his services in the War of 1812. She died on October 1, 1863.

In 1836, two years before his death, a committee led by Peter Buell Porter, a former congressman and War of 1812 general, presented Chapin with a silver setting of two massive pitchers and twelve goblets. In his remarks, General Porter said that no one displayed more patriotic zeal or enthusiasm, nor "embark[ed] in almost uninterrupted succession of enterprises against the enemy, involving imminent personal hazard, as well as great fatigue and privation, [and] none [were] more liberal of his purse."
