= Raid on Black Rock =

1813 British raid during the War of 1812

- Part of the War of 1812
Date	11 July 1813
Location	Black Rock, New York 42.928117°N 78.898058°W
Result	British victory

Belligerents
United Kingdom; Upper Canada	United States

Commanders and leaders
Cecil Bisshopp (DOW)	Peter B. Porter

Strength
240	c. 230

Casualties and losses
3 killed 24 wounded 4 wounded prisoners 13 captured	3 killed 6 wounded

The Raid on Black Rock took place during the War of 1812 between the United Kingdom and the United States on 11 July 1813, near the Niagara River in western New York, United States. The British objective was to capture supplies and equipment from the U.S. military store depot at Black Rock. The raid was a success but the British force suffered substantial casualties as they returned to their landing-point.

== The raid ==
Lieutenant Colonel Cecil Bisshopp set out in the early hours of 11 July 1813, with 20 men of the Royal Artillery, 40 of the 1st Battalion, 8th (King's) Regiment, 100 of the 1st Battalion, 41st Regiment, 40 of the 49th Regiment and 40 of the 2nd and 3rd Regiments of Lincoln Militia. This force crossed the Niagara River, landed below Black Rock and moved "with great rapidity to the attack of that post". One hundred and fifty New York Militia under the command of Major Parmenio Adams, who had been stationed at Fort Gibson to defend Black Rock, fled and Bisshopp's men set to work. They spiked two 12-pounder and two 6-pounder guns at the batteries and made off with another 12-pounder, two 9-pounders, 177 muskets, several kegs of ammunition, quantities of round shot and canister shot, a large amount of army clothing and seven large bateaux and a scow which were loaded with 180 barrels of provisions. They burned the blockhouse and barracks at both the batteries and the navy yard, and also a schooner.

Meanwhile, Brigadier General Peter B. Porter of the New York Militia, whose own house was nearby, had gathered a force to oppose the invaders. Porter's force was composed of Captain Cummings' company of U.S. regulars, 80–90 men rallied from Major Adams' garrison, 50 Buffalo Militia under Captain Bell, 30 Seneca warriors allied to the United States, and a field-piece. The American force ambushed Bisshopp's column in the dark as they marched along the beach. The British force re-crossed to Canada with all of their plunder but not without significant casualties. The worst loss for the British was the "able and enterprising" Lieutenant Colonel Bisshopp, who later died of his wounds. It was said that the British withdrawal was unduly delayed to secure several hundred prized bags of salt.

== Casualties ==
The British official casualty return gave 13 killed, 25 wounded, 4 "wounded and missing" and 2 missing. Captain Saunders of the 41st Regiment was returned as "wounded", although he was also taken prisoner. However, the Americans captured 17 prisoners, 4 of them wounded, which would indicate that 10 of the men who were thought to have been killed were in fact captured. The fact that the American report detailed only 4 wounded prisoners, including Captain Saunders, would indicate that one of the men returned as "wounded and missing" was captured unwounded. This gives a revised British casualty total of 3 killed, 24 wounded, 4 wounded prisoners and 13 other prisoners.

The American loss was 3 militiamen killed, 4 militiamen and 2 Seneca warriors wounded.
