= James Durand =

Canadian politician

James Durand (1775 – 22 March 1833) was a businessman and political figure in Upper Canada.

He was born in Abergavenny, Wales in 1775 and came to Upper Canada in 1802 to deal with delinquent accounts on behalf of a group of London merchants. Having seized the Bridgewater Works at Chippawa, Durand purchased the operation from his employers. He also established a trading depot near Long Point. In 1810, he sold the operation at Chippawa due to a downturn in the produce market. He served in the Lincoln Militia during the War of 1812. In 1815, he became the representative for West York in the 6th Parliament of Upper Canada in a by-election after Abraham Markle joined the Americans. Durand criticized the introduction of martial law during the war. With John Willson, he drafted the Common Schools Act of 1816, which introduced public support of elementary schools. He also helped establish the Gore District with Hamilton as the district town. In 1817, he was elected in the riding of Wentworth and served until 1820. He was a partner in the Desjardins Canal Company, expanded his land holdings and built sawmills to process his timber holdings.

He died in Hamilton, Ontario in 1833.

His son, James Durand, Jr., also became a member of the Legislative Assembly.

== Tribute ==
In Hamilton, Durand Park and the Durand Neighbourhood are both named after him. The Durand Neighbourhood is bounded by Main Street West (north), Queen Street South (west), James Street South (east) and the Niagara Escarpment (south). Landmarks in this neighbourhood include Hamilton City Hall, Central Presbyterian Church, Whitehern Museum, and the James Street South Shopping District.
