= M.O. Nelson =

Canadian businessman (1921–2021)

Meredith Osler Nelson
- Nelson circa 2007
- Born: July 23, 1921; Wetaskiwin, Alberta, Canada
- Died: October 1, 2021 (aged 100); Thunder Bay, Ontario, Canada
- Other name: M.O. Nelson
- Occupation: Business executive
- Employer: Kimberly Clark
- Known for: President of Kimberly-Clark Canada
- Relatives: Richard Nelson (brother)
- Family: Nelson family

Meredith Osler "M.O." Nelson (July 23, 1921 – October 1, 2021) was a Canadian businessman who was business executive at Kimberly-Clark. He served as president of Kimberly-Clark Canada, President and CEO of Spruce Falls Power and Paper, and Group President of Newsprint, Pulp and Forest Products North America. He actively served in the Royal Canadian Navy during World War II.

== Early life ==
Nelson was born in Wetaskiwin, Alberta on July 23, 1921, to Marcus and Jane Amelia Nelson. He had two older brothers: Richard and Francis, and was descended from the Nelson and Secord families on his father's side.

He grew up on a farm in Lincoln County, Ontario, and attended the General Motors Co-op engineering program, where he got a degree in Industrial Engineering. During World War II Nelson served overseas in the Royal Canadian Navy as an Ordnance Artificer.

== Career ==
In 1950 Nelson began working for Kimberly-Clark in Terrace Bay. He was then transferred to the largest K.C. mill at Neenah, Wisconsin. In 1960 he was transferred again to Niagara Falls, Ontario. After a transfer to Quebec, Nelson was asked to go to Paris, shut down a mill, and build a new one. In 1972 Nelson became the operations director in the UK but, in 1974, was made operations director of a new division in the United States. He became a vice president of Kimberly Clark during this time.

In 1978 Nelson went to Kapuskasing as president and CEO of Spruce Falls Power and Paper. While in Kapuskasing, he served on the board of directors of the Canadian Pulp and Paper Association and was chair of the board of the Ontario Forest Industries Association. In 1981 the Terrace Bay Mill was burned down, and Nelson was made president of Kimberly-Clark Canada and was asked to go and rebuild the mill. He was there for only nine months before being offered a job as a KC senior vice-president and president of Newsprint, Pulp, and Forest Products North America. The group included the total business of pulp, paper, and lumber mills, as well as forestry in the United States and Canada, and had 6,000 personnel. He retired in 1984.

== Later life and death ==
In retirement, Nelson was a director of the Thunder Bay Symphony Orchestra, a member of the Rotary Club of Port Arthur, and one of the executives of the Thunder Bay Naval Association. In 2006 the Shirley H. & Meredith O. Nelson Fund was established, which gives awards to people raised on farms who wish to pursue post-secondary health care or engineering degrees.

Nelson died in Thunder Bay at the age of 100.

== Recognition ==
Ribbon Bars of Meredith Nelson

Ribbon	Description	Notes
	War Medal 1939–1945	Awarded to all Commonwealth citizens who served full-time in the armed forces between 1939 and 1945
	Canadian Volunteer Service Medal	Awarded to any person who voluntarily served on active service in the Canadian armed forces between 1939 and 1947
	Queen Elizabeth II Diamond Jubilee Medal	Awarded to Nelson in 2012 for services as a Legion and Naval Service Officer

In 2013 Nelson was awarded the Naval Association of Canada's Bronze Medallion.
