= Secord =

Secord may refer to:

== People ==
- Al Secord (born 1958), Canadian National Hockey League player
- Campbell Secord, Canadian mountaineer on the 1952 British Cho Oyu expedition to the Himalayas
- David Secord (1759–1844), businessman and politician in Upper Canada
- George Secord (1802–1881), Canadian politician
- James A. Secord (born 1953), American-born historian of science
- John Secord (1850–1898), Canadian politician and lawyer
- Laura Secord (1775–1868), Canadian heroine of the War of 1812
- Paul F. Secord (1917-2017), American social psychologist
- Richard Secord (1932–2024), US Air Force officer convicted for his involvement with the Iran-Contra scandal
- Richard Secord (politician) (1860–1935), Canadian politician
- Walt Secord (born 1964), Canadian-born Australian politician

== Places ==
- Secord, Edmonton, a neighborhood in western Edmonton, Alberta, Canada
- Secord Township, Michigan, US

== Other uses ==
- Laura Secord Chocolates, Canadian chocolatier and ice cream company
- Secord family, a colonial family from New York
