= James Secord =

James Secord may refer to:

- James A. Secord, American-born historian
- James Secord (merchant), American-born merchant, soldier, and public servant
