= Secord family =

Colonial New York family

Secord family Sicard, Secor
- Current region: Canada and the United States
- Origin: France
- Founded: 17th century
- Founder: Ambroise Sicard (c. 1631–c. 1712)

The Secord family (originally Sicard) was a colonial New York family whose loyalties were split during the American Revolution. The family traces its origins back to Ambroise Sicard who was born in France about 1631. Sicard, a Huguenot, brought his family to British America in 1688 to escape religious persecution. Although a few of his descendants were active as Patriots during the American Revolution, a significant number were Loyalists who joined British provincial regiments such as Butler's Rangers, and afterwards settled in what is now Ontario and New Brunswick.

== Origins ==
During the 17th century, the Sicard family lived near La Rochelle on the Bay of Biscay. The ancient origins of the family are uncertain. Although a number of theories have been proposed, none has been proven. The Sicard family were French Calvinist Protestants, also known as Huguenots. The Huguenots had been granted substantial rights in the 1598 Edict of Nantes, but Louis XIV renounced the Edict in 1685, triggering massive persecution. Tens of thousands of Huguenots fled France to England including Sicard. From England, Sicard brought his family to the English colony of New York in 1688. With other Huguenot families, he founded New Rochelle in Westchester County about 1689. In the years that followed, Ambroise Sicard's descendants spread to other areas of Westchester County as well as neighbouring Orange and Dutchess counties. By the time of the American Revolution, most had adopted Secor or Secord as their surname. Several researchers have noted that those family members who were active Loyalists during the American Revolution all had the Secord surname.

Family historian R. Kirk Moulton has researched the family in depth. His findings were published in a seven-installment series in the New York Genealogical and Biographical Record in 2019 and 2020. Moulton concluded that all Secords are descended from Ambroise Sicard.

== Ambroise Sicard ==
Ambroise Sicard was born about 1631 in Mornac sur Seudre, south of La Rochelle. He was a saunier, or salt worker, harvesting salt from the salt marshes, and also owned a vineyard worth 40 livres. Threatened with forcible conversion to Catholicism, Sicard fled with his family to the Île de Ré and later to London. His eldest son married while the family was in London. In 1688, Ambroise joined other Huguenots sailing for New York. The baptism of Madeline Sicard, his first grandchild, on October 22, 1688, is recorded in the registers of L’Eglise Française a la Nouvelle York. The following year Sicard moved from the city to neighbouring Westchester County, and with other Huguenots founded the settlement of New Rochelle on land purchased from Pelham Manor. He eventually acquired several tracts of land, helped establish the French Church at New Rochelle, and was active in local government. On February 6, 1696, Sicard and his three sons swore allegiance to King William and Queen Mary of England.

Ambroise had six children although there were likely others who died in infancy. According to family tradition, Ambroise's wife and a child died before the family reached New York. Ambroise Sicard died c. 1712 at New Rochelle and was survived by his three sons and two daughters.

Descendants of Ambroise Secord
Ambroise Sicard (c. 1631–1712)
  - Ambroise Sicard (c. 1666–1735) mar. 1st Jeanne Perron; mar. 2nd Unknown
    - Madeline Sicard (1688– ?)
    - Anne Sicard (c. 1692)– ?)
    - Ambroise Sicard (1697– ?)
    - Judith Sicard (c. 1702–c. 1741)
    - Mariane Sicard (1704– ?)
    - Daniel Sicard (aft. 1712–c. 1801) mar. 1st Mary Archer; mar. 2nd Abigail Fowler
    - Paul Sicard (aft. 1712– ?)
  - Daniel Sicard (c. 1672–c. 1742) mar. Catherine Wynant
    - Daniel Secord (1698– ?) mar. Catherine Mabie
      - Catherine Secord (1721–1801)
      - Daniel Secord (1724–c. 1818) mar. Elinor Archer
        - Daniel Secord (1756– ?)
        - John Secord (1762–1817)
        - Warner Secord (c. 1750– ?)
      - John Secord (1725–1804)
        - Sarah Secord (1751–1804) mar. Isaac Swayze
        - John Secord (1757–1830) mar. Susannah Wartman
          - Daniel Secord (1780–1837)
            - Daniel K. Secord (1819–1857)
              - John Secord QC (1850–1898)
          - Abraham Wartman Secord (1795–1852)
        - Daniel Secord (1762-abt. 1845)
      - Peter Secord (1726–1818)
        - Silas Secord (c. 1755– ?
        - David Secord (1773–1827)
      - Rachel Secord (1726– ?)
      - James (Jacques) Secord (1732–1784) mar. Magdelaine Badeau
        - Solomon Secord (1755–1799)
          - George Osmond Secord (1798–1883)
            - Solomon Secord (1834–1910)
        - Stephen (Etienne) Secord (1757–1808)
          - David Secord (1790–1846)
            - James Richard Secord (1832–1897) mar. Jane Manley
              - Richard Secord (1860–1935)
        - David Secord (1759–1844)
          - David Secord (1794–1821)
          - George Secord (1801–1881)
        - John Secord (1762–1846)
        - Magdalen Secord (1764–1827) mar. Richard Cartwright
          - John Solomon Cartwright (1804–1845)
          - Robert Cartwright (1804–1843) mar. Harriet Dobbs
            - Richard John Cartwright (1835–1912)
        - Esther Secord (1766–1802)
        - Mary Secord (1770–1841)
        - James Secord (July 7, 1773 – February 22, 1841) mar. Laura Ingersoll
    - Jacques Sicard (c. 1699–1773) mar. Jeanne Bonnett
      - Benjamin Secord (1735–1811)
      - Israel Secord (1748–1819)
    - Pierre (Peter) Sicard (c. 1701– ?) mar. Hester Guion; Captain in the Westchester County Militia during the French and Indian War
    - Catherine Sicard (1704– ?)
    - Jean (John) Sicard (c. 1707– ?)
      - John Secor (c. 1729– ?)
        - Isaac J. Secor (1751–1835) emigrated to Upper Canada after the Revolutionary War
    - Isaac Sicard (1715–1759) died during the French and Indian War
      - Isaac Secord (1749–1818)
      - Josiah Secord (1751–1832)
      - Daniel Secord (1753–1843)
      - Elie Secord (1755– ?)
      - Frederick Secord (1756– ?)
    - Elizabeth Sicard (c. 1724– ?)
    - Marie Sicord (1725–1801) mar. Daniel Chadeayne
  - Jacques Sicard (c. 1675– ?) mar. Anne Terrier
    - Elizabeth Sicard (c. 1700– ?)
    - Jacques Sicard (c. 1701– ?) mar. Marianne Ravaux
    - Susanne Sicard (1704– ?)
    - Esther Sicard (c. 1705– ?)
    - Catherine Sicard (c. 1707– ?)
    - Anne Sicard (c. 1710– ?)
    - Jean Sicard (1712– ?)
    - Mary Sicard (1713–1806)
    - Isaac Secor (c. 1715– ?)
    - Elias Secor (c. 1717– ?)
      - Elias Secord (1748–1838)
      - William Secord (c. 1754–(c. 1844)
    - David Secor (1721– ?) mar. Rebecca Halstead
      - Jacob Secor (1745–1818)
      - David Secor (c. 1749– ?)
      - James Secor (1751–1820)
      - Isaac Secor (1755– ?)
      - John Secor (1757– ?)
      - Jonas Secor (1760– ?)
  - Marie Sicard (c. 1677– ?) mar. Guillaume (William) Landrin
  - Sylvie Sicard (c. 1680- ?) mar. Francois Coquillet

Note: The information in this chart is derived from R. Kirk Moulton's "Early Sicard-Secor Families of New York: Origins of United Empire Loyalist William Secord."

== Revolutionary War ==
The American Revolution divided the family. Some family members were active Patriots who enlisted in the Continental Army, while others served in Patriot militias. A significant number were Loyalists who left their homes and families and joined British provincial regiments such as Butler's Rangers.

In April 1775, just before the start of the Revolutionary War, a meeting of roughly 100 Patriots was held in Westchester County to select representatives for a meeting in New York that would choose delegates for the Second Continental Congress. At the same time, roughly the same number of Loyalists gathered at the house of Abraham Hatfield, then marched in protest to the Patriot meeting. Afterwards, 312 inhabitants of the county signed a document affirming their loyalty to the British Crown, including Elias, Francis, Israel, Joshua, and Benjamin Secord.

In May 1775, male residents aged 21 and over in Orange County were asked to sign a resolution known as an association test, indicating their loyalty to the provincial government and their rejection of British rule. Nine members of the Secord family signed, however, five refused to do so.

A few years before the Revolution, brothers John, Peter and James Secord settled on the North Branch of the Susquehanna River in what is now Pennsylvania. In the spring of 1777, the three, accompanied by five of their sons, journeyed to Fort Niagara and joined the British Indian Department. Following the August 1777 Siege of Fort Stanwix, authorization was given for John Butler to raise the "a corps of rangers" which became known as Butler's Rangers. Seven of the eight enlisted in the new regiment, while James elected to continue serving in the Indian Department.

After the war, members of the Secord family who had demonstrated their loyalty to the British Crown received grants of land in what is now Ontario and New Brunswick. Their children were also eligible for land grants once they reached adulthood. Loyalists could also submit claims for losses as a result of the war although only Solomon Secord and William Secord appear to have done so.

=== Loyalists ===
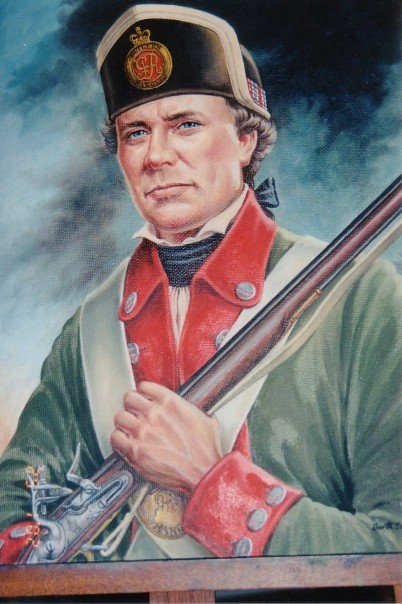
Portrait of a Butler's Ranger by Garth Dittrich

John Secord: John Secord (1725–1804), son of Daniel Sicard (1698–1765), served with the 5th Company, Upper Battalion, Westmoreland Militia during the French and Indian War. Shortly before the Revolution, he settled on the North Branch of the Susquehanna River. He was arrested as a British spy in March 1776 but successfully appealed his imprisonment to the Connecticut government. He joined the British Indian Department at Fort Niagara in 1777 and later transferred to Butler's Rangers. John was discharged in October 1778 due to his age and settled across the Niagara River in what became Niagara Township.

Peter Secord: Peter Secord (1726–1818), son of Daniel Sicard (1698–1765) enlisted in the 5th Company, Upper Battalion of the Westchester County Militia during the French and Indian War. He settled on the North Branch of the Susquehanna River shortly before the Revolution. Peter joined the British Indian Department at Fort Niagara in 1777 and later transferred to Butler's Rangers. He was discharged in October 1778 due to his age. In 1780, Peter settled across the Niagara River in what became Niagara Township, and with his brother James built and operated the first mill in the region. He later moved to the Long Point area.

James (Jacques) Secord: James Secord (1732–1784), son of Daniel Sicard (1698–1765), enlisted in the 5th Company, Upper Battalion of the Westchester County Militia during the French and Indian War. He settled on the North Branch of the Susquehanna River shortly before the Revolution. James joined the British Indian Department at Fort Niagara in 1777. James retired sometime after April 1779. Three of his sons joined Butler's Rangers. In 1780, James settled across the Niagara River in what became Niagara Township, and with his brother Peter built and operated the first mill in the region. His children were granted 2,000 additional acres of land for their father's service during the war.

Solomon Secord: Solomon Secord (1755–1799), son of James Secord (1732–1784), joined the British Indian Department at Fort Niagara in 1777, later transferred to Butler's Rangers, and was promoted first to corporal and then sergeant. He later received a commission as a 2nd Lieutenant. After the war he settled across the Niagara River in what became Niagara Township.

Stephen (Etienne) Secord: Stephen Secord joined the British Indian Department at Fort Niagara in 1777, later transferred to Butler's Rangers, and rose to the rank of sergeant. After the war he settled across the Niagara River in what became Niagara Township.

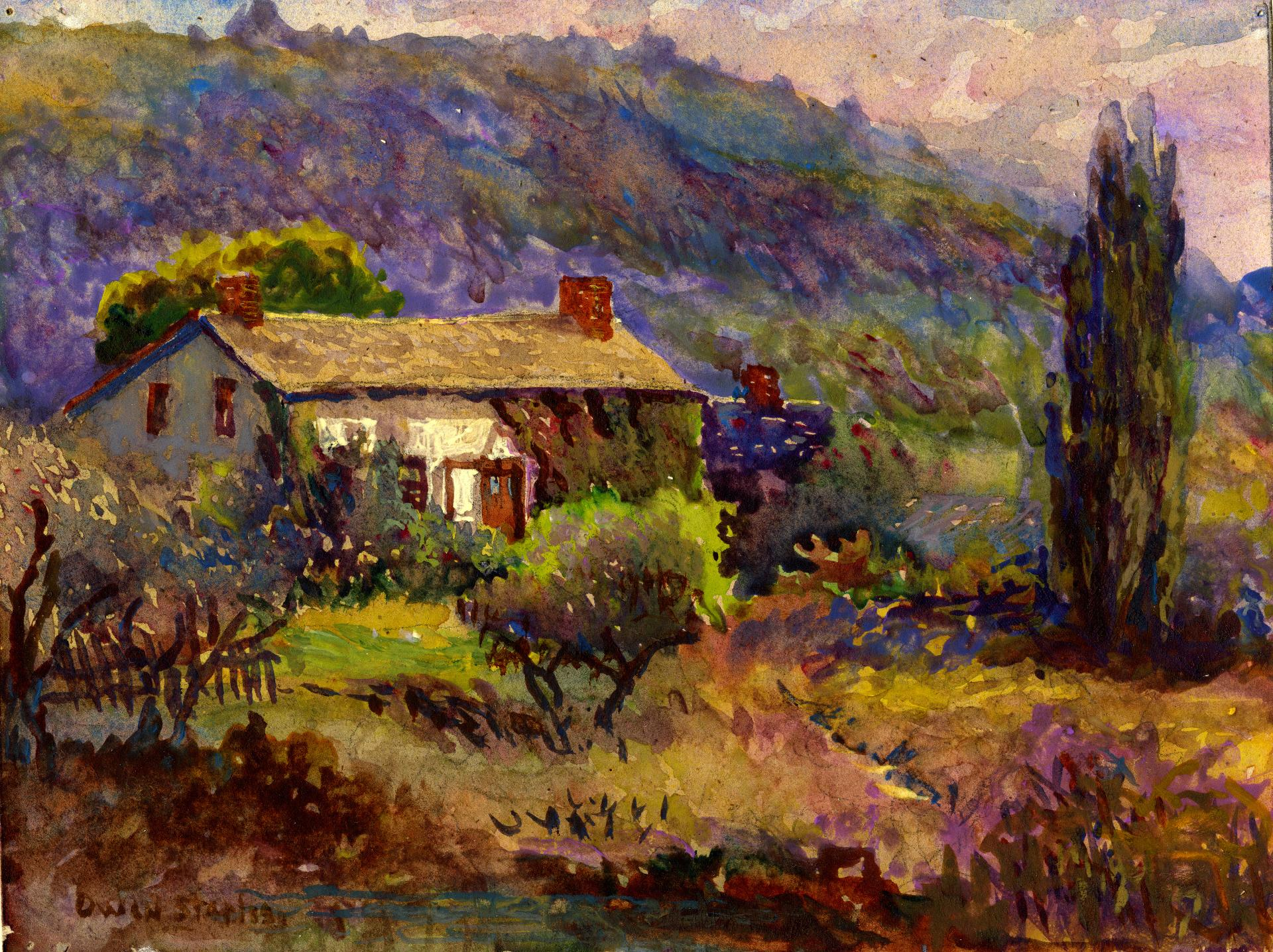
David Secord's House, St. David's (Niagara-on-the-Lake, Ontario)

David Secord: David Secord (1759–1844), the son of James Secord (1732–1784), joined the British Indian Department at Fort Niagara in 1777, was wounded at the Battle of Fort Stanwix, and afterwards joined Butler's Rangers. After the Battle of Wyoming he was tasked with guarding three American prisoners. According to family tradition, the prisoners had been part of a party that had attacked a Mohawk village and killed the wife of Oneida Joseph. When Joseph heard that the murderers were prisoners, he demanded to be allowed to kill them. Secord would not permit it, to which the Chief replied, "I kill them or kill you," as he thrust his spear through Secord's coat. He was later promoted to corporal and then sergeant. After the war he settled across the Niagara River in what became Niagara Township. Secord was appointed a justice of the peace in 1796 and represented 2nd Lincoln in the 5th Parliament of Upper Canada from 1809 to 1812. During the War of 1812, Secord served as a Major in the 2nd Regiment of Lincoln Militia. He claimed to have fought in every significant engagement in the Niagara region during the War of 1812, and was in command of his regiment at the Battle of Lundy's Lane. He represented 3rd Lincoln in the 7th Parliament from 1817 to 1820.

John Secord: John Secord (1757–1830), known as 'Deaf John' due to his hearing loss from a cannon shot, joined the British Indian Department at Fort Niagara in 1777, later transferred to Butler's Rangers, and served as a private until his discharge in October 1778. In 1780, he settled across the Niagara River in what became Niagara Township. In a certificate attached to his Upper Canada land petition, he is described as "a brave man, having after the Battle of Wyoming, when the Loyalists were retreating towards Niagara (and found it necessary to have a better supply of Provisions) returned by desire of the commanding officer to Wyoming, with only eight men and brought from the Enemy, One Hundred and forty head of Cattle – upwards of ninety Head were drove to Aughquaga, and there issued to the troops, and the others used for an immediate Supply."

Daniel Secord: Daniel Secord, son of Daniel Secord (1724–1818) joined Brant's Volunteers in 1777. After the war, Joseph Brant granted Secord a 999-year lease on 200 acres in the Haldimand Tract.

John Secord: John Secord, son of Daniel Secord (1724–1817) joined the New York Volunteers and rose to the rank of Sergeant. He was discharged in New Brunswick in 1783, but after a few years joined his brother in Upper Canada.

Silas Secord: Silas Secord (c. 1755– ?), son of Peter Secord (1726–1818) Secord joined the British Indian Department at Fort Niagara in 1777, transferred to Butler's Rangers, and rose to the rank of sergeant. After the war, Silas settled across the Niagara River in what became Niagara Township, but later moved to the Long Point area.

William and Elias Secord: William and Elias Secord, sons of Elias Secor (c. 1717– ?) emigrated in 1783 to what later became New Brunswick. They were part of the exodus of Loyalists from New York City, having crossed British lines into the city in 1777. During their time in New York, William worked in the shipyard while Elias served in the Prince of Wales' American Regiment until discharged in 1778 due to illness. Both William and Elias married and had children while living in New York.

=== Patriots ===
Josiah Secord: Josiah Secord (1751–1832), son of Isaac Secor (1715–1759), served in the 2nd Regiment Dutchess County Militia. Several years after the war he emigrated to Upper Canada and settled in the Niagara District.

John Secor: John Secor (1756–1830), son of David Secor (1721–1797), enlisted in the 5th New York Regiment in June 1777, was promoted to corporal in August 1780, and deserted in December 1780. The 5th New York saw action at the Battle of Forts Clinton and Montgomery in 1777 and during the 1779 Sullivan Campaign.

Isaac Secor: Isaac Secor (1755–1836), son of David Secor (1721–1797) enlisted in the 3rd New York Regiment in July 1775. He was court-martialled for attempted desertion in October 1775 and was fined a month's pay. He was with the regiment during the Invasion of Quebec but was discharged due to frostbite before the Battle of Quebec. Secor reenlisted in the Continental Army several times and was with the regiment at the Battle of Long Island in 1776, the Battle of Forts Clinton and Montgomery in 1777, and the Sullivan Campaign in 1779. Between enlistments he served in the 2nd Regiment Orange County Militia.

James Secor: James Secor (1751–1820), son of David Secor (1721–1797), enlisted as a sergeant in the 3rd New York Regiment in 1775. The 3rd Regiment saw action during the Invasion of Canada and the Battle of Quebec. He returned to New York when his enlistment expired and served as a sergeant in the 2nd Regiment Orange County Militia.

Additional members of the Secor family served in the militias of Orange, Westchester, and Dutchess counties. Jonas Secor is recorded as having served in the New York Levies.

== War of 1812 ==
During the War of 1812, the Secords who lived in Upper Canada were active in the defence of their colony against the Americans. Members of the family served in various militia regiments including the 1st Lincoln, 2nd Lincoln, 5th Lincoln, 1st Norfolk, 1st Middlesex, and the Niagara Light Dragoons. Several served as officers or senior enlisted including Major David Secord of the 2nd Lincoln and Captain David Secord (1773–1827) of the 1st Middlesex. Daniel Secord (1780–1837) was Quartermaster of the 1st Lincoln, and Abraham Wartman Secord (1795–1852) was a Sergeant Major with the 5th Lincoln. David Secord (1794–1821) was a corporal in the Niagara Light Dragoons but was captured and held as a prisoner of war for most of the conflict. James Secord (1773–1841) was seriously wounded at the Battle of Queenston Heights. Members of the family were also present at the Battle of Fort George, the Battle of Chippewa, and the Battle of Lundy's Lane.

== Notable members ==
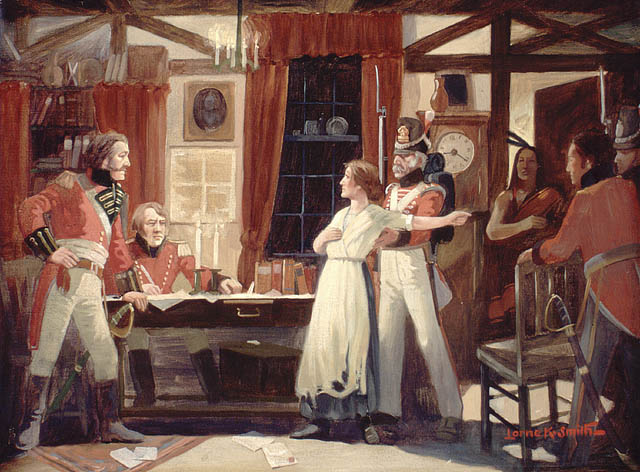
Laura Secord Warns Lieutenant Fitzgibbons by C. W. Jefferys

Laura Secord (née Ingersoll) was a Canadian woman known for her 32 kilometres (20 mi) trek from Queenston to Beaver Dams to warn British Lieutenant James FitzGibbon that the Americans were planning to attack his outpost during the War of 1812. Laura has become mythologized in Canadian history. She was married to James Secord, a great-great-grandson of Ambroise Sicard. Laura Secord Chocolates was named for her.

James Secord was a merchant in Upper Canada who was seriously wounded at the Battle of Queenston Heights during the War of 1812. He was the husband of Laura Ingersoll.

George Secord was a political figure who as a member of the Conservative Party represented Monck in the Legislative Assembly of Ontario from 1867 to 1871.

John Secord QC, a great-grandson of John Secord (1757–1830) was a lawyer and political figure who represented Regina in the 1st Council of the North-West Territories and Regina South in the Legislative Assembly of the Northwest Territories.

Richard Secord, a great-grandnephew of James and Laura Secord, was a merchant and politician in western Canada who served in the Legislative Assembly of the Northwest Territories. He and John McDougall founded Secord & McDougall, which advertised itself as general merchants. He was also a land speculator who dealt in Métis scrip. Secord was known for his philanthropy.

Richard Vernon Secord (1932–2004), a descendant of Isaac I Secor (1755–1836) was a United States Air Force officer who rose to the rank of Major General. He served in the Vietnam War, the Secret War in Laos, and participated in the Battle of Lima Site 85. He is particularly known for his involvement in the Iran-Contra Scandal.

Solomon Secord (1834–1910), a great-grandson of Loyalist Solomon Secord (1755–1799), was a Confederate Army surgeon during the American Civil War. After the war he returned home to Kincardine, Ontario and worked as a family physician for 50 years. A monument to Dr. Secord was erected in the town square shortly after his death. The Municipality of Kincardine Council voted to decommission the monument in 2024 because the inscription refers to the doctor's Confederate Army service, implying that he approved of slavery.

== Legacy ==
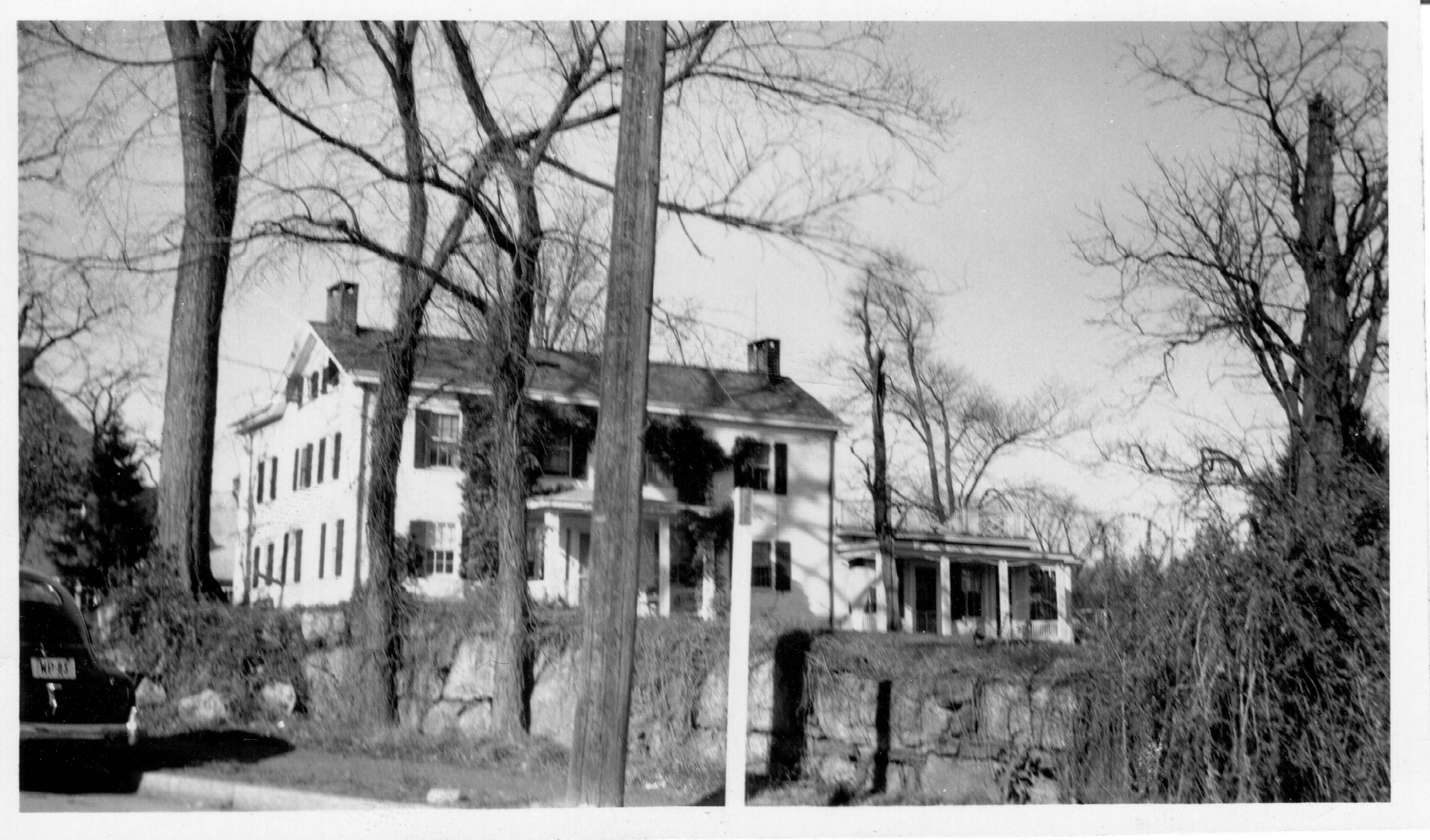
The Israel Secord House in New Rochelle, New York

Isaac Secord House: This privately owned house in New Rochelle was built c. 1775 by Israel Secord (c. 1748-1819) on land deeded to him by his father. During the Revolutionary War, William Howe, commander of British forces, made his headquarters in the farmhouse prior to the Battle of White Plains in October 1776. In the rear of the home stood the "hanging tree," an oak tree from the 1700s reportedly used to execute prisoners during the Revolutionary War.

Secord Township, in Gladwin County, Michigan, was named for Marvel Secord, a grandson of Daniel Secord (1756– ?) and an early settler of township. When the Tittabawassee River was dammed in 1925, both the dam and the resultant lake were named after him.

Laura Secord is one of 14 important figures from the military history of Canada commemorated at the Valiants Memorial in Ottawa. The Laura Secord Legacy Trail in the Niagara region is a 32 kilometres (20 mi)trail constructed as a monument to Laura Secord's journey to warn the British during the War of 1812. Laura Secord's home from 1803 to 1835 still stands in the village of Queenston near the site of the Battle of Queenston Heights and is operated as a museum. Several schools in Canada are named after her.

Ambroise the Huguenot is a 2007 self-published historical novel written by Esther Secor Cleveland, a descendent of Ambroise Sicard. The book is loosely based on Ambroise Sicard's journey from France to New York.

The Peter Secord House was constructed in the 1780s on land granted to Peter Secord in what is now the hamlet of St. David's in Niagara-on-the-Lake, Ontario. The house is currently operated as an inn. The Secord Mill in St. David's, Niagara-on-the-Lake was built in 1782 on Four Mile Creek and was operated by Peter and James Secord. It was one of the first "King's mills" in Upper Canada and may be the only surviving 18th-century banal mill in Ontario.

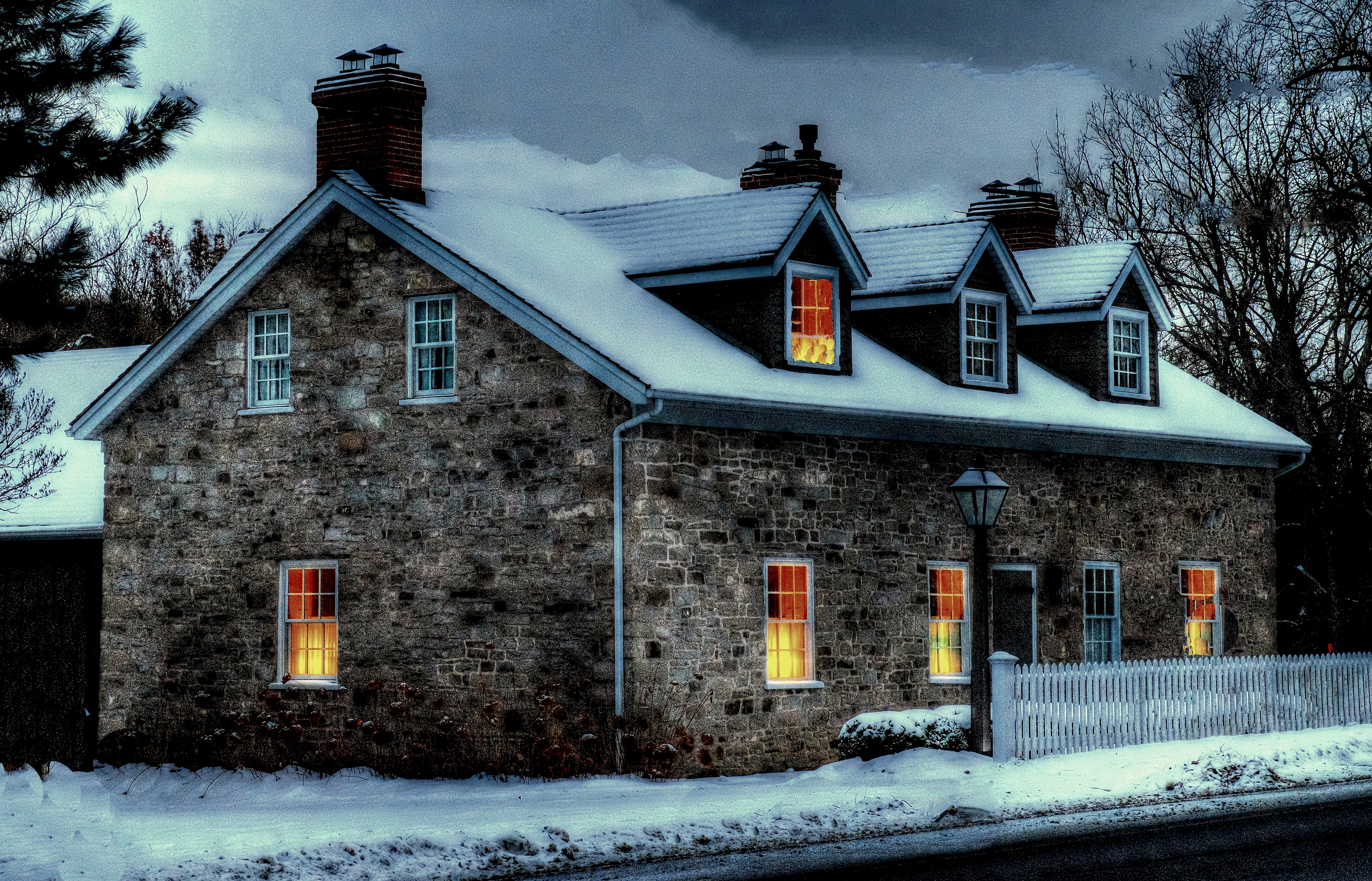
The Peter Secord house in St. Davids, Niagara-on-the-Lake, Ontario built in 1782

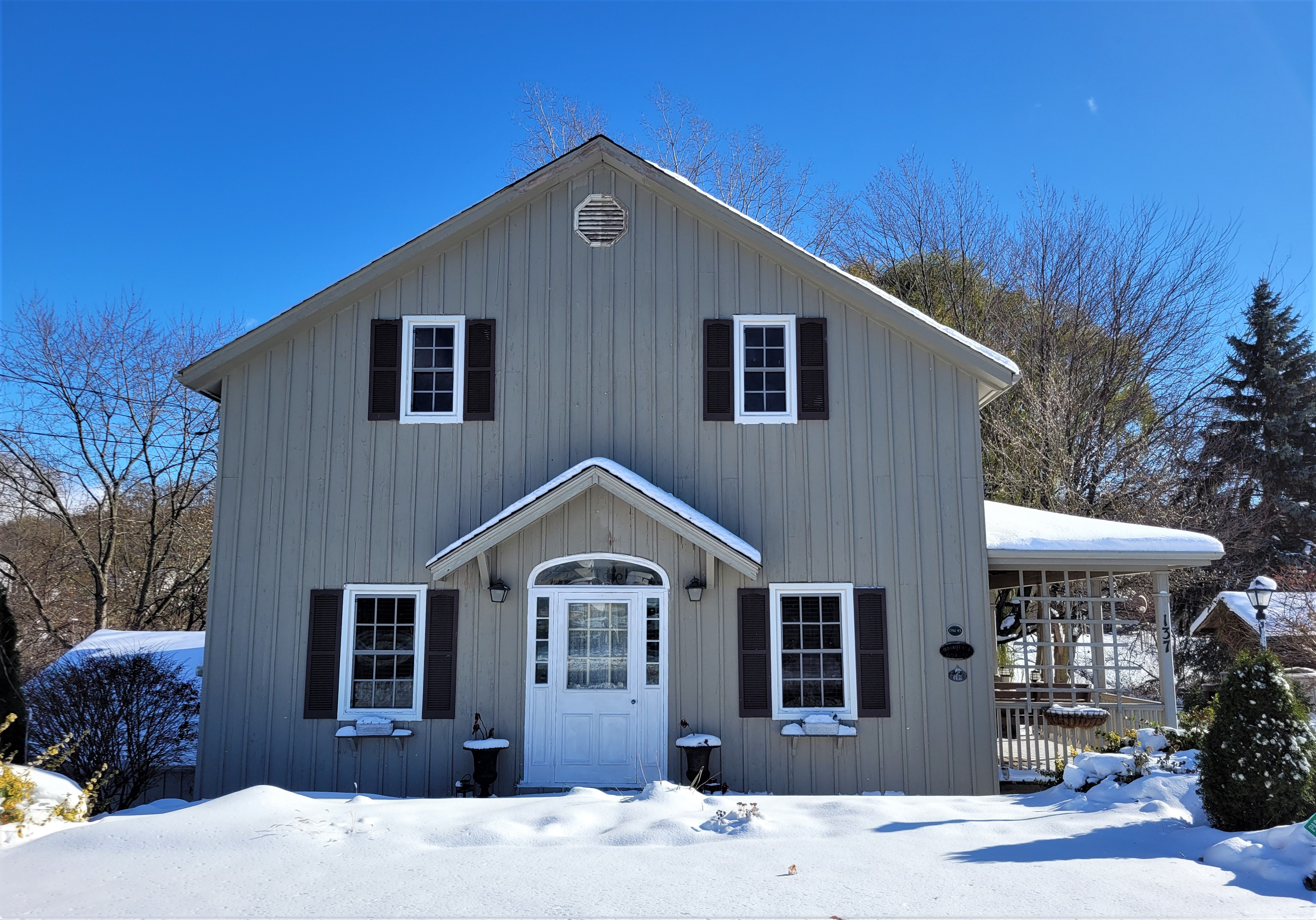
The Secord Mill in St. Davids, Niagara-on-the-Lake, Ontario was built and operated by Peter and James Secord in 1782.

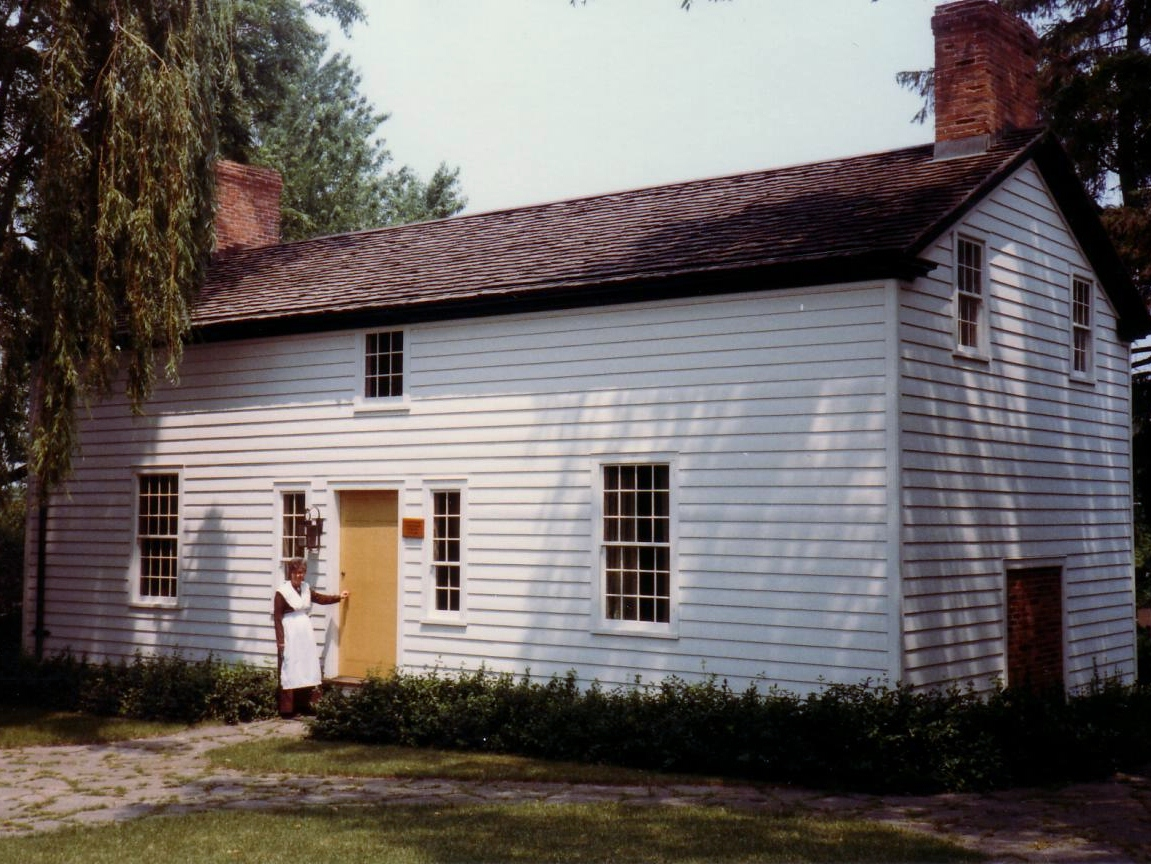
The home of James and Laura Secord from 1803 to 1835 in Queenston, Niagara-on-the-Lake, Ontario
