= Richard Nelson (RAF officer) =

Canadian–born Royal Air Force officer (1907–2001)

Sir Richard Nelson
- Nelson (1963)
- Born: November 13, 1907; Ponoka, Alberta, Canada
- Died: November 5, 2001 (aged 93); Hampshire, UK
- Alma mater: University of Alberta
- Relatives: Nelson family
- Military career
- Allegiance: United Kingdom
- Branch: Royal Air Force
- Service years: 1934-1967
- Rank: Air Marshal
- Commands: RAF Medical Services
- Conflicts: World War II
- Awards: Order of the British Empire (officer), Order of Bath (Knight Commander), Order of Saint John (commander)

Air Marshal Sir Richard Carlyle Nelson, KCB, OBE, CStJ, QHP (November 13, 1907 – November 5, 2001) was a Canadian-born senior Royal Air Force officer who acted as Director-General of the RAF Medical Services from 1962 to 1967 and Honorary Physician to the Queen from 1961 until 1967.

== Early life ==
Nelson was born in Ponoka, Alberta, Canada, on November 13, 1907 to Marcus Nelson and Jane Amelia Cartwright. He had two brothers: Meredith and Francis, both of whom served. He graduated from the University of Alberta with his MD and, In the 1930s, moved to the UK, where in 1934, he joined the RAF.

== Military service ==
Nelson joined the RAF in 1934 as a Flying Officer. In 1936 he was promoted to the rank of Flight Lieutenant which he held until 1940. When the RAF established a field hospital at Fuka in the Western Desert, he was the senior medical Flight Lieutenant in the Middle East and was appointed to command it. As the post was a Wing Commander's post, he went straight from Flight Lieutenant to Wing Commander. He remained in this rank until he was promoted to Group Captain in the 1950s. In 1957, he was promoted to Air Commodore. Two years after, in 1959, he was promoted to the acting rank of Air Vice-Marshal. During Nelson's tenure as Air Vice-Marshal, he was made Honorary Physician to the Queen (QHP) in 1961. His final promotion in 1962 made him an Air-Marshal as Director-General of the RAF medical services, a post which he held until his military retirement in 1967.

== Honours ==
In 1949 Nelson was made an officer of the Order of the British Empire (OBE). In 1961 he was created Honorary Physician to the Queen (QHP). One year later, in 1962, he was created Commander of the Order of Bath (CB). In 1963 he was knighted as Knight Commander of the Order of Bath (KCB). In 1964, Nelson was made a Commander of the order of Saint John (CStJ).

== After Service ==
After his retirement from the RAF in 1967, Nelson joined the Nicholas Research Institute in Slough, as medical director and Director of Research until his retirement in October 1972. He died in 2001 at his home in Hampshire, UK.
