= Lennox and Addington (Province of Canada electoral district) =

Province of Canada electoral district

Lennox and Addington Canada West
Province of Canada electoral district

Defunct pre-Confederation electoral district
- Legislature: Legislative Assembly of the Province of Canada
- District created: 1841
- District abolished: 1867
- First contested: 1841
- Last contested: 1863

Lennox and Addington was an electoral district of the Legislative Assembly of the Parliament of the Province of Canada, in Canada West (now Ontario). Based on the combined counties of Lennox and Addington, it was created in 1841, upon the establishment of the Province of Canada by the union of Upper Canada and Lower Canada.

Lennox and Addington was represented by one member in the Legislative Assembly. It was abolished in 1867, upon the creation of Canada and the province of Ontario.

== Boundaries ==
Lennox and Addington electoral district was located in the eastern area of Canada West. It extended from the Bay of Quinte on the north shore of Lake Ontario north to the Ottawa River.

The Union Act, 1840 had merged the two provinces of Upper Canada and Lower Canada into the Province of Canada, with a single Parliament. The separate parliaments of Lower Canada and Upper Canada were abolished. The Union Act provided that the pre-existing electoral boundaries of Upper Canada would continue to be used in the new Parliament, unless altered by the Union Act itself.

Lennox and Addington Counties had been an electoral district in the Legislative Assembly of Upper Canada. Their boundaries were not altered by the Union Act. Those boundaries had originally been set by a proclamation of the first Lieutenant Governor of Upper Canada, John Graves Simcoe, in 1792, defining the two separate counties of Addington and Lennox (originally called Lenox):

That the eighth of the said counties be hereafter called by the name of the county of Addington; which county is to be bounded on the east by the westernmost line of the county of Frontenac, on the south by lake Ontario, to the westernmost boundary of the late township of Ernestown, and on the west by the easternmost boundary line .of the township of Fredericksburgh, running north thirty-one degrees west until it meets the Ottawa or Grand river, thence descending the said river until it meets the northwesternmost boundary of the county of Frontenac; comprehending within the said county all the islands nearest to it, in the whole or greater part fronting the same.

That the ninth of the said counties be hereafter called by the name of the county of Lenox; which county is to be bounded on the east by the westernmost line of the county of Addington, on the south and west by the bay of Quinte, to the easternmost boundary of the Mohawk village, thence by a line along the westernmost boundary of the late township of Richmond, running north sixteen degrees west to the depth of twelve miles, thence running north seventy-four degrees east until it meets the northwesternmost boundary of the county of Addington; and comprehending all the islands in the bays and nearest to the shores thereof.

The boundaries had been further defined by a statute of Upper Canada in 1798:

That the townships of Ernesttown, Fredericksburgh, Adolphustown, Richmond, Camden (distinguished by being called Camden East,) Amherst Island, and Sheffield, do constitute and form the incorporated Counties of Lenox and Addington.

Since Lennox and Addington were not changed by the Union Act, those boundaries continued to be used for the new electoral district.

== Members of the Legislative Assembly ==
The district of Lennox and Addington was represented by one member in the Legislative Assembly. The following were the members for Lennox and Addington.

Parliament	Years	Member	Party
1st Parliament; 1841–1844	1841–1844	John Solomon Cartwright	Unionist; Compact Tory

== Abolition ==
The electoral district was abolished on July 1, 1867, when the British North America Act, 1867 came into force, creating Canada and splitting the Province of Canada into Quebec and Ontario. It was succeeded by electoral districts of Leeds North and Leeds South in both the House of Commons of Canada and the Legislative Assembly of Ontario.
