= James Secord (merchant) =

Merchant, soldier and civil servant in Upper Canada

James Secord (1773–1841)
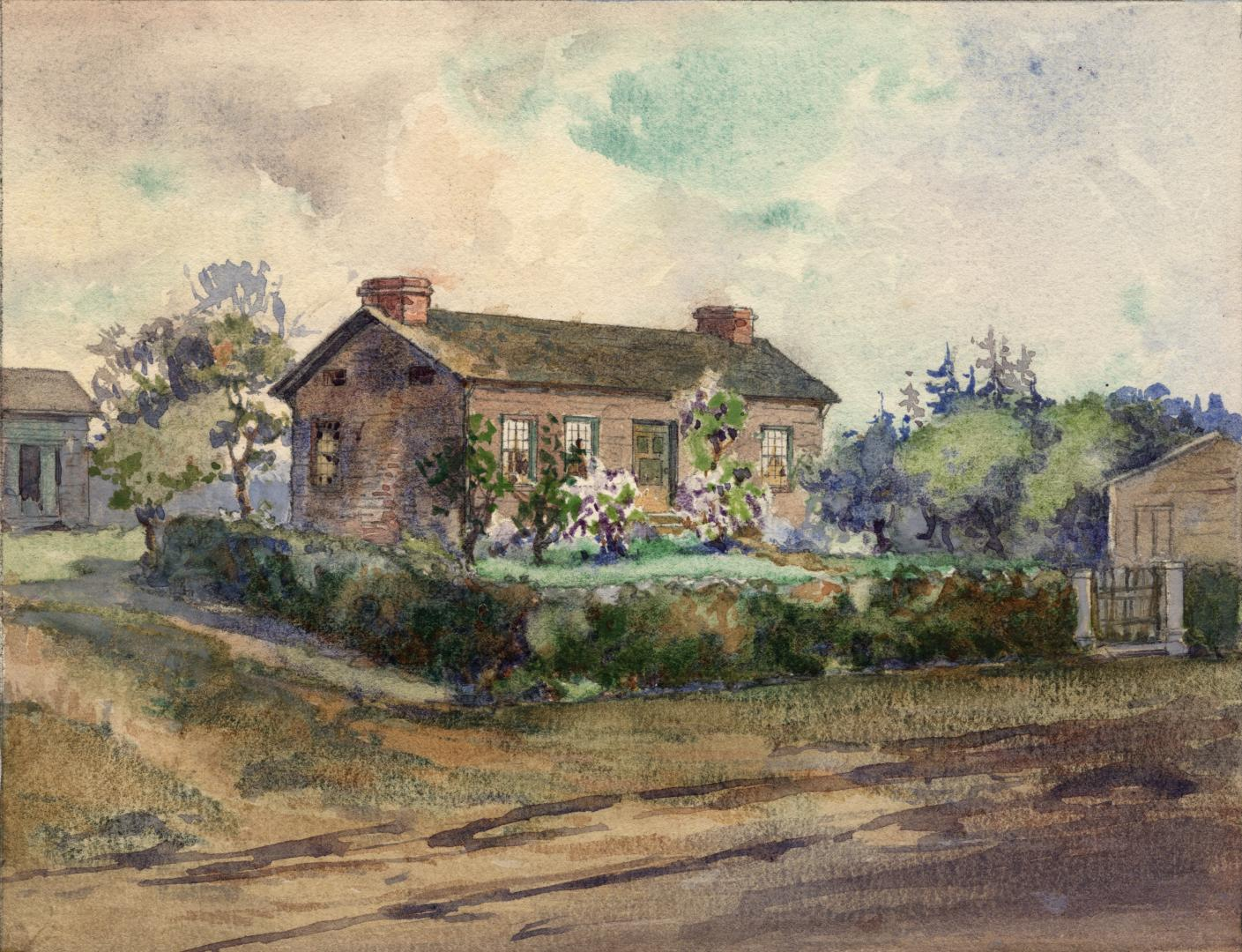
- James Secord's home in Queenston, Ontario was painted by John Wesley Cotton in 1913; Courtesy of Toronto Public Library
- Born: July 7, 1773; Westchester County, Province of New York
- Died: 22 February 1841 (aged 67); Chippawa, Welland, Upper Canada
- Spouse: Laura Ingersoll
- Children: 7
- Relatives: Secord family
- Military career
- Allegiance: Great Britain
- Rank: Sergeant
- Unit: Provincial Artillery Drivers
- Conflicts: Battle of Queenston Heights (War of 1812)

James Secord (July 7, 1773 – February 22, 1841) was a merchant, soldier, and civil servant in Upper Canada. He served in the militia during the War of 1812, but was severely wounded at the Battle of Queenston Heights. James married Laura Ingersoll, who is considered a Canadian heroine after she warned the British of a planned American attack in 1813.

== Early life ==
James Secord was born on July 7, 1773, in Westchester County, Province of New York. He was the youngest child of James Secord (1732–1784) and Madelaine Badeau. James was a descendant of Ambroise Sicard, a Hugenout who had come to British America in 1688 to escape religious persecution in France.

While James was still an infant, his family moved west and settled on the Susquehanna River in an area that was claimed by both Connecticut and Pennsylvania. In 1777, during the American Revolutionary War, his father and three older brothers travelled to Fort Niagara and joined the British Indian Department leaving Madelaine and the younger children behind. His brothers transferred to Butler's Rangers upon its formation while his father continued serving in the Indian Department as a Lieutenant.

The following year, Madelaine abandoned their home on the Susquehanna and brought James and his three sisters to Fort Niagara. In a letter written in 1861 to the Reverend Egerton Ryerson, Elizabeth Spohn described how her grandmother, Elizabeth Bowman, arrived at Fort Niagara along with Madelaine and her children:

...in the fall the commander of the British forces at Niagara, hearing of their destitute situation, sent a party with some Indians to bring them in. They brought in five families: the Nellises, Secords, Youngs, Bucks, and our own family (Bowman), five women and thirty-one children, and only one pair of shoes among them all.

By August 1780, James's father had left the Indian Department and had begun clearing land along Four Mile Creek west of the Niagara River. In 1782, his father and an uncle, Peter Secord, obtained government help with the construction of a gristmill and sawmill with the understanding that the mills would be owned by the Crown but operated by the Secords. Construction of the mills was completed late in 1783. When James's father died in 1784, his uncle became the sole tenant. A small village known as Four Mile Mills developed around the mills but later underwent a name change to St. Davids.

== Merchant ==
James became a merchant in St. Davids dealing in flour, potash and other products. He inherited a share of his father's land and in 1796 was granted additional land as the son of a Loyalist. In 1797, he married Laura Ingersoll, daughter of Thomas Ingersoll, an innkeeper in the nearby village of Queenston. James and Laura lived in St. Davids for the first few years after their marriage, but moved to Queenston in 1803. Their first child, Mary, was born in 1799, followed by Charlotte in 1801, Harriet in 1803, Charles in 1809, and Appolonia in 1810.

James struggled as a merchant in both St. David's and Queenston. He was frequently in debt and lost most of his land holdings through sales or foreclosure. One of James creditors was his brother-in-law, Kingston merchant Richard Cartwright who was highly critical of James's business practices. Business, however, slowly improved and by 1812, James was able to employ two servants and could claim that he was "in easy circumstances."

== War of 1812 ==
When the United States declared war against Britain in June 1812, James joined the militia as a sergeant in the 1st Lincoln Regiment but was later attached to Isaac Swayze's troop of Provincial Royal Artillery Drivers, also known as the "Car Brigade." This unit was responsible for moving field guns and supplying ammunition during military engagements. James had previously been a captain in the 1st Lincoln Regiment but had resigned his commission before 1812.

On October 13, 1812, the Americans crossed the Niagara River and landed near Queenston. Laura and her five children took shelter in a farmhouse about a mile inland, while James mustered with the militia. During the ensuing Battle of Queenston Heights, James was shot twice, once in the shoulder and once in the knee. When the guns fell silent, Laura cautiously returned to the village to discover that American soldiers had ransacked her house. She received word that James had been wounded and headed for the battlefield. With the help of a "gentleman" Laura brought James to their home and treated his injuries. Once James was well enough to be moved, Laura took her husband and children to St. Davids where they spent the winter living with James's relatives.

An early biographer of Laura Secord, Emma A. Currie, claimed that James helped carry Major General Isaac Brock's body off the battlefield, however, this unlikely story does not appear in later biographies. Currie also related a story, attributed to James and Laura's grandson, that Laura encountered three American soldiers intending to club her wounded husband to death with their muskets. An American officer, Captain John E. Wool intervened, sent the three back across the river under guard, and ordered his men to carry James to his house in Queenston. This story has been discounted by later biographers as the Americans had surrendered hours before James was found.

In May 1813, the Americans invaded again and for the next seven months occupied the west side of the Niagara River. James and Laura were forced to billet several American officers in their home. In the evening of June 21, either James or Laura overheard the officers discussing a planned attack on a British outpost commanded by Lieutenant James FitzGibbon. The next morning, Laura set out a 20 miles (32 km) walk to warn the British. Two days later a large contingent of American soldiers commanded by Lieutenant Colonel Charles G. Boerstler were ambushed and defeated at the Battle of Beaver Dams by a force of Mohawk from Kahnawake and the Grand River, along with FitzGibbon's detachment of the 49th Regiment. Roughly 475 American soldiers were taken prisoner including their wounded commander.

== After the war ==
James and Laura struggled financially for many years after the war. His wounds were disabling and he never fully recovered. He needed a walking stick to move about and was no longer able to engage in physical labour.

In 1820, James was given a license to operate a quarry on the military reserve near Queenston, however, dressed stone was not in high demand. Three years later he was granted a pension of £18 a year for his wartime service. James claimed for property damages and losses during the war and was compensated £485. In a 1829 letter to Laura's sister he wrote: "With respect to our worldly affairs I am sorry to say we are not very prosperous. We make out to live and have clothing and food, but riches, my dear woman, it seem, is not for James Secord." In 1832, James successfully petitioned for a grant of land as he had been a captain in the 1st Lincoln before the war. James was appointed Registrar of the Niagara District Surrogate Court in 1828, and was made a Judge of the Surrogate Court a few years later. He resigned from this position in 1835 when he was appointed Collector of Customs at Chippawa. James and Laura turned over their Queenston home to their son Charles, and moved to the Customs House in Chippewa.

James died of a stroke on February 22, 1841 at the age of 67. He was survived by Laura and six of his seven children. Two more children had been born after the war, Laura Ann in 1815 and Hannah in 1817, but his daughter Appolonia had died in Queenston from typhus at the age of 18. James was buried in the Drummond Hill Cemetery, site of the 1814 Battle of Lundy's Lane.
