= John Solomon Cartwright =

Upper Canada lawyer, judge, businessman and politician

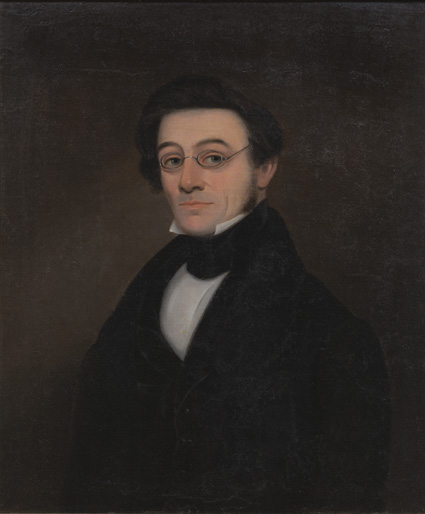

Member of the Legislative Assembly of Upper Canada for Lennox and Addington County
- In office 1836–1840 Serving with George Hill Detlor
- Preceded by: Marshall Spring Bidwell; Peter Perry
- Succeeded by: Position abolished

Member of the Legislative Assembly of the Province of Canada for Lennox and Addington
- In office 1841–1844
- Preceded by: New position
- Succeeded by: Benjamin Seymour

Personal details
- Born: September 17, 1804 Kingston, Upper Canada
- Died: January 15, 1845 (aged 40) Kingston, Canada West
- Party: Compact Tory
- Spouse: Sarah Hayter Macaulay
- Relations: Harriet Dobbs (sister-in-law); Sir Richard John Cartwright (nephew)
- Children: Four daughters, three sons
- Parent: Richard Cartwright (father)
- Occupation: Lawyer, landowner, businessman

Military service
- Allegiance: Britain
- Branch/service: Upper Canada militia
- Rank: Lieutenant-Colonel
- Commands: 2nd Lennox Regiment

John Solomon Cartwright, QC (September 17, 1804 – January 15, 1845) was a Canadian businessman, lawyer, judge, farmer and political figure in Kingston, Upper Canada. He was a supporter of the Family Compact, an oligarchic group which had dominated control of the government of Upper Canada through their influence with the British governors. He was also a member of the Compact Tory political group, first in the Legislative Assembly of Upper Canada, and then in the Legislative Assembly of the Province of Canada.

In spite of his relative youth when first elected in 1836, age 32, he was an influential member of the Compact Tory group in the Assembly. He was courted by two governors general to join the executive council of the Province of Canada, but declined each time, not willing to associate in government with the radical Reform members of the Assembly. He favoured including French-Canadians in the government of the new Province of Canada, but opposed the use of French in the Assembly and the courts.

In the aftermath of the Upper Canada Rebellion of 1837, he acted as a prosecutor in the trials of some alleged rebels, and was one of the military judges in the court martial of Nils von Schoultz, who had led an invasion force from the United States. In the trials, Cartwright worked with a rising young Kingston lawyer, John A. Macdonald, the future Prime Minister of Canada. In addition to his legal practice, he was involved in successful banking and land transactions.

Wealthy, and holding a large farming estate near Kingston, Cartwright donated land and buildings for public purposes in Kingston and neighbouring Napanee. A bon vivant, he enjoyed gambling with cards for high stakes, horse racing, and the elegancies of life, both food and good wine.

Cartwright died of tuberculosis in 1845, aged 40.

== Early life and family ==
John Cartwright was born in Kingston, Upper Canada on September 17, 1804, the son of Richard Cartwright, a Loyalist, and Magdalen Secord, sister-in-law of Laura Secord, the Loyalist heroine. John's father was engaged in commerce and politics, being a member of the Legislative Council of Upper Canada. His father was also instrumental in bringing John Strachan to Kingston, initially to tutor John and his twin brother Robert. Strachan went on to become the first Bishop of Toronto for the Church of England in Canada, and a pillar of the Family Compact, an oligarchic conservative group that had informal control over the provincial government.

Richard Cartwright died in 1815, when John and his twin brother were ten years old. He left John an inheritance of £10,000. John and Robert had older siblings, but several died of tuberculosis.

In 1831, John married Sarah Hayter Macaulay, daughter of James Macaulay. The couple had seven children. While studying theology at Oxford University, his brother Robert married Harriet Dobbs of Ireland. Their son, John's nephew, was Sir Richard John Cartwright, who had a notable political career in the Parliament of Canada, although as a Liberal.

Cartwright was somewhat of a throwback to the Regency era, rather than the new Victorian period. He enjoyed horse-racing and betting, gambling with cards for high stakes, and the elegancies of life, good food and wine. Like most of the Family Compact, he was a strong supporter of the Anglican church. He was also a freemason, eventually becoming a warden of a masonic lodge in Kingston.

== Legal and business career ==
Deciding to enter the legal profession, at the age of 16 Cartwright left home for York, the capital of Upper Canada, where he articled with John Beverley Robinson. Robinson was the attorney general for Upper Canada and one of the main leaders of the Upper Canada Tories and the Family Compact. Following his articles with Robinson, Cartwright was called to the bar of Upper Canada in 1825. In 1827, after the death of his mother, he went to London and studied law at Lincoln's Inn, while his twin brother Robert attended Oxford, studying for the ministry. Cartwright returned to Kingston in 1830, where he established his legal practice and quickly became one of Kingston's leading lawyers.

In addition to his legal practice, Cartwright was involved in banking and real estate transactions. In 1832, he became the first president of the local Kingston bank, the Commercial Bank of the Midland District. He was the unanimous choice of the bank directors, even though he was only 28 years old. Under his leadership over the next fourteen years, the Commercial Bank became the leading bank of the eastern part of the province, and was the only bank that did not suspend payments in specie during the Upper Canada Rebellion in 1837. In 1834, he became a judge in the Midland District and was named Queen's Counsel in 1838. Although a young man in his mid-thirties, he had developed a strong reputation for prudence, sobriety and integrity in his business dealings.

Cartwright also became involved in major land transactions. In addition to projects in Kingston and Napanee, he was involved in land matters in Hamilton, Niagara, and Montreal. He sold a significant tract of land in Hamilton to Allan MacNab, another leading figure in the Tory political group. When one of Cartwright's good friends and business associates, James Bell Forsyth, was in serious financial difficulties, he avoided bankruptcy because Cartwright came to his financial rescue.

With the success of his legal practice and business activities, Cartwright established a country estate outside of Kingston, named Rockwood, with an attached farm. He invested heavily in his cattle and sheep, and by 1841 was winning prizes with them in the local agricultural fairs.

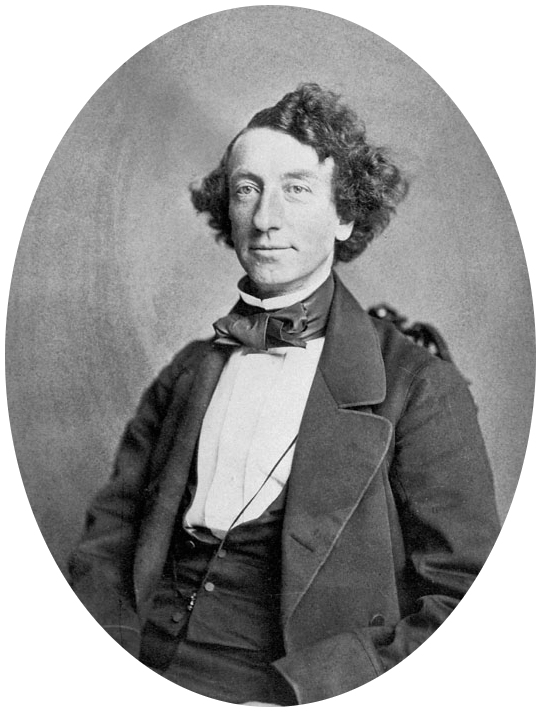
John A. Macdonald, who received Cartwright's legal library

Cartwright gradually accumulated a large collection of law books. When he was in England, he had spent around £250 acquiring legal texts, which he brought back to Kingston. He viewed his collection as public in nature, and readily loaned out books to other lawyers. When he was dying, he was concerned that his collection should stay in the Kingston area, and sold his library at a great discount to John A. Macdonald, then a young lawyer starting his career, who went on to be the prime minister of Canada.

== Rebellions of 1837–38 ==
Cartwight was a staunch supporter of the British colonial government during the Rebellions of 1837–1838. He had been an officer in the local militia since 1822, and was the lieutenant-colonel of the 2nd Lennox militia during the rebellion. As an officer, Cartwright sat on the court martial in 1838 which tried Nils von Schoultz, who had led the invaders from the United States at the Battle of the Windmill, in the Patriot War. John A. Macdonald acted as von Schoultz's legal adviser, but under the law governing courts martial, von Shoultz had to conduct his own defence. Against Macdonald's advice, he pled guilty and assumed full responsibility for his actions. The court martial, including Cartwright, convicted von Schoultz for leading the invasion and condemned him to death. Von Schoultz was hanged at Fort Henry, Kingston, on December 8, 1838.

In the summer of 1838, Cartwright acted as the Crown prosecutor in treason trials for eight individuals from the Kingston area who were alleged to have taken up arms in the rebellion. Cartwright gave them a fair prosecution, allowing the accused a considerable degree of indulgence in their defence. Macdonald was again involved, this time as full defence counsel. In these cases, the jury returned acquittals.

== Political career ==
=== Upper Canada ===
==== Member for Lennox and Addington ====
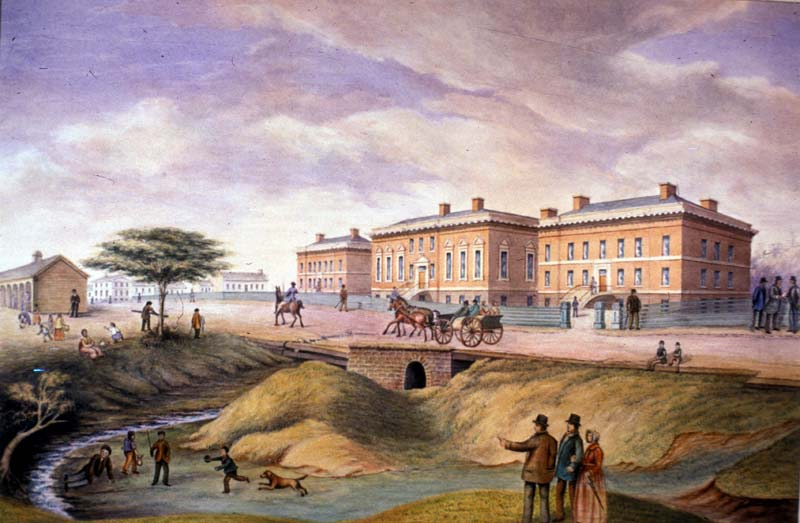
Parliament of Upper Canada

In 1834, Cartwright stood for election as a Tory to represent the combined district of Lennox and Addington counties in the Legislative Assembly, the lower house of the Parliament of Upper Canada, but was defeated by the two Reform movement candidates, Marshall Spring Bidwell and Peter Perry. Cartwright came in third in the two-member riding.

Two years later, in the general election of 1836, Cartwright tried again. This time, he was successful, benefiting from the strong showing the Tories made in the election, under the leadership of the Lieutenant Governor, Sir Francis Bond Head. The Tories had held political control in the province by means of their strong influence over the succession of governors sent from Britain. The members of the Reform movement challenged that oligarchic dominance, arguing for greater popular and democratic control of the provincial government. Bond Head campaigned on the basis that the election represented a choice between Tory loyalism to the Crown and Empire, and Reformer republicanism. The Tories won a substantial victory, gaining a clear majority in the Legislative Assembly. Cartwright and his fellow Tory candidate in Lennox and Addington, George Hill Detlor, defeated Bidwell and Perry. Cartwright and Detlor took their places in the thirteenth Parliament of Upper Canada.

As a member of the Legislative Assembly, Cartwright secured a charter for the town of Kingston in 1838, and helped to draw up the initial procedures for election of town officials. The Council unanimously elected him mayor, but he declined to serve. When the new governor general, Lord Durham, visited Kingston on a tour of Upper Canada in the summer of 1838, Cartwright was chosen to give the welcoming address on behalf of the town.

==== Cartwright's conditions for union of Canadas ====
Following the rebellions of 1837, there was a clear understanding that there had to be structural changes in the governments of Upper Canada and Lower Canada. The British government sent Lord Durham to investigate the political situation and to make recommendations for change. In his Report, Lord Durham recommended that the two Canadas should be re-united under a single government, with local control through the principle of responsible government, as used in the British Parliament. Durham also had harsh words for the Tories and the Family Compact, and their dominance of public affairs in the province, in spite of their lack of popular support.

Tories such as Cartwright were strongly opposed to Durham's recommendation for responsible government, which would reduce their power. Cartwright was deeply supportive of the British connection and British North America's place in the British Empire, but as he explained some years later in a letter to Governor General Bagot, he viewed the principle of responsible government as unfitted to the local conditions of Upper Canada: "... with our position as a Colony, – particularly in a country where almost universal suffrage prevails, – where the great mass of the people are uneducated, – and where there is but little of that salutary influence which hereditary rank and great wealth exercises in Great Britain."

The decision on union rested with the British government, but they considered it important to have support from the local British colonists of Upper Canada. In the spring session of 1839, the Legislative Assembly debated the union proposal given by the Lieutenant Governor, Sir George Arthur, who had replaced Bond Head. By substantial majorities, the Assembly voted its general approval of the proposal, in three related resolutions. Cartwright was amongst the majority who voted in favour of the union, and voted against a proposed amendment which suggested the French-Canadians of Lower Canada had forfeited their civil and political rights by their "disloyalty" in the late rebellion. Like the other Tories, he strongly supported maintaining the British connection. As well, as a businessman, he saw the commercial advantages if Upper Canada and Lower Canada were re-united into one single province, eliminating potential trade and customs barriers.

The Assembly then appointed a select committee to prepare instructions for a proposed delegation to London to set out the views of Upper Canadian supporters of the union. Cartwright was one of the members of the select committee. Although he supported union in principle, he was concerned that the English population of Upper Canada would lose control if united with French-speaking Lower Canada, which had a greater population. When the report of the select committee came to the Assembly for consideration, he proposed a series of conditions to seek guarantees of continued influence for Upper Canada. Key amongst the conditions were that Upper Canada would have more representatives in the new Legislative Assembly than Lower Canada; the Gaspé region would be transferred from Lower Canada to New Brunswick; the existing members of the Legislative Council of Upper Canada would be continued in office in the legislative council of the new government; the capital would be in Upper Canada; and only English would be used in the Parliament and the courts. The Legislative Assembly approved the Cartwright resolutions, and passed an additional resolution that it would be "distinctly opposed" to the union unless those resolutions were incorporated.

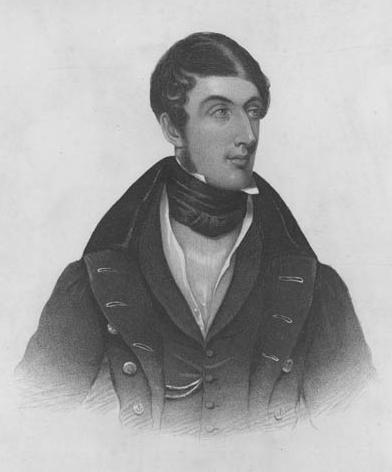
Governor General Charles Thomson (later Lord Sydenham), who pushed for the acceptance of the union in the Canadas

In December 1839, the new governor general, Charles Poulett Thomson (later appointed to the peerage as Lord Sydenham), advised the Assembly that the British government could not accept the conditions proposed by the Assembly, and insisted on unconditional approval of the union. The Legislative Assembly then passed a motion of approval without the Cartwright conditions. Undeterred, in January 1840, Cartwright and the other Tories presented a pared-down list of conditions for agreement to the union. Although Cartwright was not personally present for the vote due to a personal commitment, the Assembly approved the new conditions. The final version of the Address to the Queen supported the union in principle, including the equal representation of Upper Canada and Lower Canada in the Assembly, but called for provisions that English would become the sole language in the courts and in legislative debates; that the capital should be in Upper Canada; that there be a real estate qualification for membership in the Legislature; that emigration from Britain be encouraged; and that local governments be established in Lower Canada, similar to those in Upper Canada. The Address affirmed that the people of Upper Canada wished to maintain a constitutional system based on "... the representative mode of government under a monarchy, and to a permanent connexion with the British Empire, and a dutiful allegiance to our Sovereign." On receiving this version of the Address to the Queen, Governor General Thomson advised that he agreed with the provisions, including that English should be the sole language in the courts and the Assembly.

=== Province of Canada ===
==== Relations with moderate Tories ====
In 1840, the British Parliament enacted the Act of Union, which united Lower Canada and Upper Canada into the Province of Canada. The Act was proclaimed in force in February 1841, and elections were held in March and April. Lower Canada was now referred to as Canada East, and Upper Canada as Canada West. The Act provided that English was to be the language of the Parliament, one of the conditions which Cartwright had proposed, even though Cartwright repeatedly stated that he thought French-Canadians needed to be included in the government of the province.

In his Report, Lord Durham had been highly critical of the Family Compact and its previous dominance of the government of Upper Canada. The new governor general, Thomson, made it clear that he wanted to establish a broad-based government, with representatives in the executive council from the different political groups, and a focus on commercial and economic development rather than ideological or constitutional disputes.

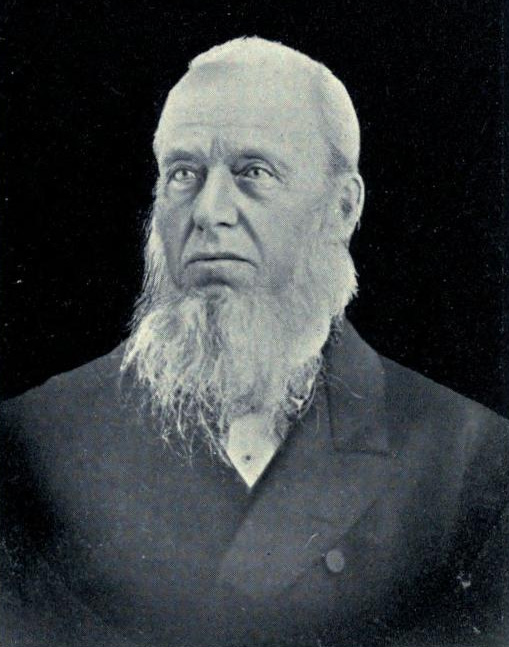
Attorney General Draper, who approached Cartwright about establishing a broad-based conservative party

In light of these developments, in November 1840 the Attorney General of Upper Canada, William Draper, began corresponding with Cartwright. Draper was a moderate Tory, whose interests were mainly commercial. He had co-operated with Thomson in obtaining the Upper Canada Assembly's approval for the union. Now, with the union approaching, he sounded out Cartwright on the possibility of creating a conservative party which could unite both the high Tories of the Compact, and the more moderate Tories which Draper represented.

Cartwright was apparently interested in the possibility, but after consulting with other Compact Tories, such as Allan MacNab and Robinson (now Chief Justice of the King's Bench of Upper Canada, but still involved in politics), he ultimately rejected Draper's proposal. Unlike his colleagues, Cartwright distrusted Draper's political honesty. Cartwright's leadership role with the Compact Tories was such that his refusal to act with Draper put an end to the proposal. The two Tory factions would continue to be separate in the new Parliament.

==== First session of Parliament, 1841 ====
In 1841, Cartwright was elected to the Legislative Assembly of the first Parliament of the Province of Canada, again representing Lennox and Addington. One of the first matters before the new Legislative Assembly was a series of motions indicating support for the union of Upper Canada and Lower Canada into the Province of Canada. Cartwright, along with Compact Tory members such as Allan MacNab and George Sherwood, again voted in support of the union. However, Sydenham, following his instructions from Britain, was determined to form a broad-based centrist government, and excluded the Compact Tories, precisely as Durham had advocated. The feeling was mutual: Cartwright and the other Tories generally opposed the measures proposed by Governor General Sydenham in the first session of the Parliament.

==== Second session of Parliament, 1842 ====
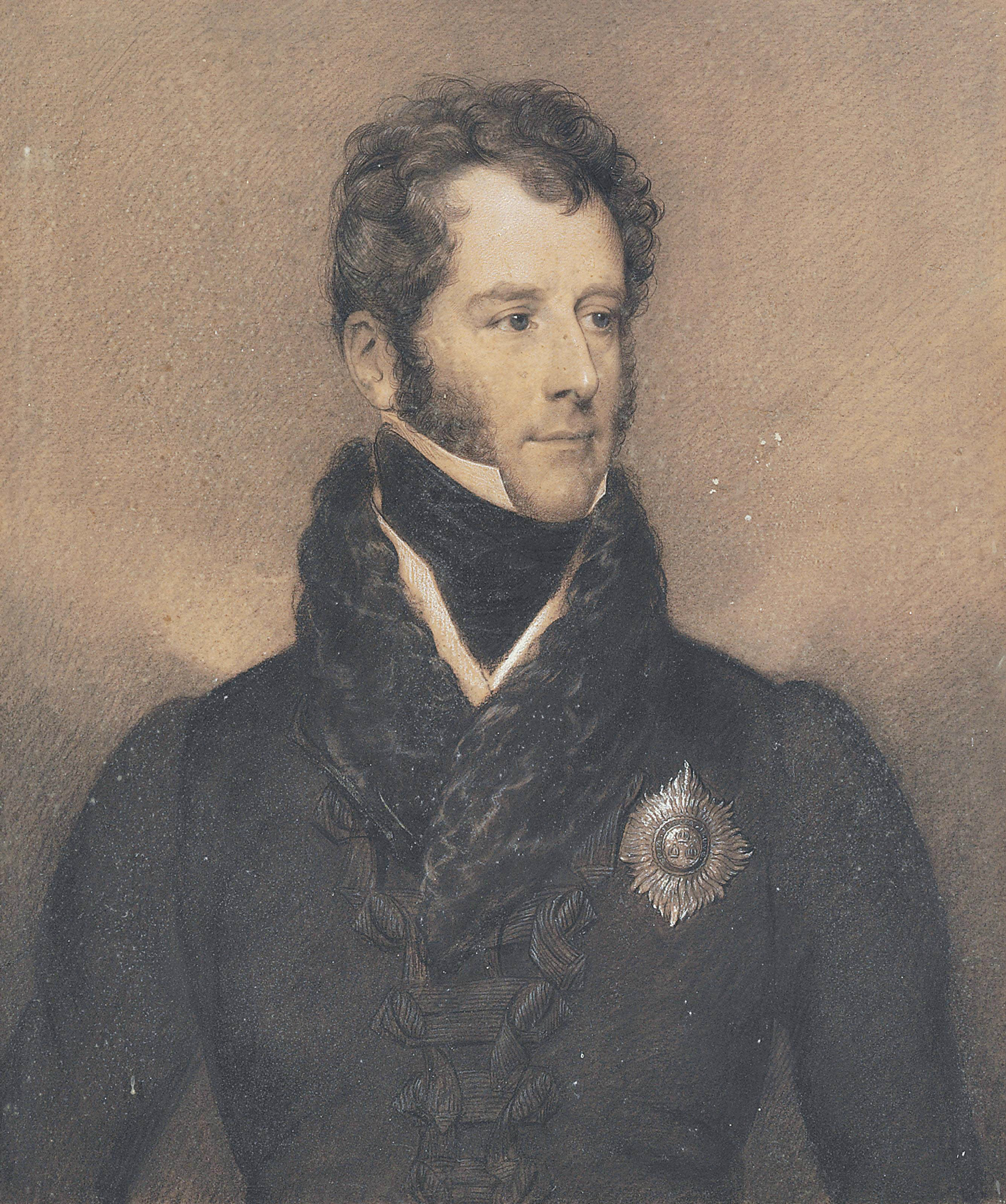
Sir Charles Bagot, Governor General of the Province of Canada, 1842–1843

A year later, the political situation had changed. Sydenham had died suddenly in September 1841, of tetanus caused by a fall from his horse. The new governor general, Sir Charles Bagot, was appointed in 1842. Like Sydenham, Bagot tried to put together a ministry that crossed political divisions, including Compact Tories, moderate Tories such as Draper, and even "ultra" Reformers, notably Francis Hincks.

Bagot offered Cartwright the position of solicitor general for Canada West. Although the Tories respected the new governor general personally, after extensive consultations with his fellow Compact Tories, Cartwright declined the offer, because he could not join a ministry with Hincks, who in his view was a radical Reformer who had given unacceptable support to the leaders of the 1837 rebellions, William Lyon Mackenzie and Louis-Joseph Papineau. Cartwright's refusal to enter the ministry brought the plan to an end, and had the effect of also excluding Draper, who advised Bagot that in the circumstances he could not join the new ministry. The net effect was that the governor general felt obliged to form a ministry with the strong Reformers, Robert Baldwin and Louis-Hippolyte Lafontaine, as well as some moderate conservatives. The new ministry included several French-Canadian members from Canada East under Lafontaine's leadership.

Soon after the second session of Parliament was called, a resolution was introduced in support of the new ministry. MacNab and Cartwright introduced an amendment to the resolution which, although seen as critical of the new Reform-based ministry, nonetheless approved the inclusion of French-Canadian members in the ministry, stating: "... it is necessary and proper to invite that large portion of our fellow subjects who are of French origin to share in the Government of their country." The proposed amendment was defeated, demonstrating how little support the Compact Tories now had. The Compact Tories, including Cartwright, formed the nucleus of opposition to the new ministry.

Cartwright's approval of French-Canadian members in the ministry was consistent with his political views on the union. Although he opposed the use of French in the Legislative Assembly and the courts, Cartwright believed that the union could only work if French-Canadians were included in the government. Writing to Governor General Bagot in 1842, he stated that he was anxious to see the new province function well for all its citizens, and added: "But I do not see how it can be possible to arrive at this desirable end, without the concert and co-operation of the French Canadians." He was also highly critical of the conduct of the former governor general, Sydenham, in the first elections for the new Province of Canada the year before. Sydenham had gerrymandered the seats in French-speaking areas of Lower Canada to favour British voters, personally campaigned for the English party in Lower Canada, and had ignored cases where electoral violence had broken out against French-Canadian candidates, such as Lafointaine. In his letter to Bagot, Cartwright stated: "I cannot imagine how it could have ever been supposed that harmony could be produced by an act of the grossest injustice."

==== Third session of Parliament, 1843 ====
===== Invitation to join government =====
Governor General Bagot died in May 1843, and was replaced by Sir Charles Metcalfe. A ministerial crisis was looming, as Metcalfe and his two main ministers, Lafontaine and Baldwin, entered a dispute over the appointment of government officials. It resulted in the resignation of the entire Lafontaine-Baldwin ministry in November 1843. Metcalfe then tried, as Bagot had tried the year before, to assemble a broad-based coalition that would attract general support, while excluding Lafontaine, Baldwin, and the other strong proponents of responsible government. Metcalfe invited Cartwright to consider joining the government, along with moderate Reformers from Canada West and Canada East. Cartwright attended some initial meetings, but ultimately did not agree to join the government. The moderate Reformers also refused to enter government, as did Reformers of Canada East, who continued to support Lafontaine. The result was that for a year, Metcalfe governed with a ministry of only three members, and did not recall the Legislative Assembly.

===== Proposal for reform schools =====
Cartwright was interested in penal reforms for juveniles, and thought that they should not be treated in the same way as adult offenders. In 1843, he proposed a form of juvenile reform school that he called "Juvenile Houses of Refuge", to shelter juvenile offenders. They would no longer be housed in the same facilities as adult offenders, and "... by labor and attention to their moral culture, they would become good members of society." Not all of the other members of the Assembly approved of his proposal. Cartwright's approach to the issue contrasted sharply with the harsher views of the outspoken member for Huron, William "Tiger" Dunlop, who said in the debates that Cartwright was displaying "maudlin sensibility", and if he had his way the children would be whipped and sent to bed. Cartwright had some support from other members, including Thomas Cushing Aylwin, the Solicitor-General for Canada East, and the matter was referred to a special committee of the Assembly. However, the proposal never came to a vote, as the Legislative Assembly was prorogued in December 1843, upon the resignation of the Lafontaine–Baldwin ministry. Juvenile reform schools would not be implemented until fifteen years later, long after Cartwright's death.

==== Mission to London, 1844 ====
In 1843, the Legislative Assembly passed a motion proposing that the provincial capital be moved from Kingston to Montreal. Cartwright opposed the move. He believed that it was important to keep the capital amongst the British colonists, and that relocating it to Montreal, where the French influence would be stronger, would weaken the Province's attachment to Britain. Although in failing health from tuberculosis, in March 1844 he travelled to England to present a petition to the British government, with 16,000 signatures, opposing the proposal to move the capital. He was unsuccessful in his mission, and Montreal became the capital later in 1844.

The lengthy voyage was hard on Cartwright's health, and he realised that he no longer could participate in political life. He announced his retirement to his constituents in Kingston in October 1844. Governor General Metcalfe regretted Cartwright's retirement, as he had come to rely on Cartwright as an informal advisor.

== Patron of architecture ==
Cartwright and the Cartwright family are credited in having a major effect on the architecture of public buildings in Kingston by choosing or helping influence the selection of architects. He and his brother Robert are believed to have commissioned the architect Thomas Rogers for their two townhouses in Kingston: John Cartwright's house at 221 King Street East, and Robert Cartwright's house at 191 King Street East. Cartwright also built an office building for his law practice at 223 King Street East, connected to his residence. As president of the Commercial Bank for the Midland District, Cartwright likely commissioned Rogers for the bank's Kingston building.

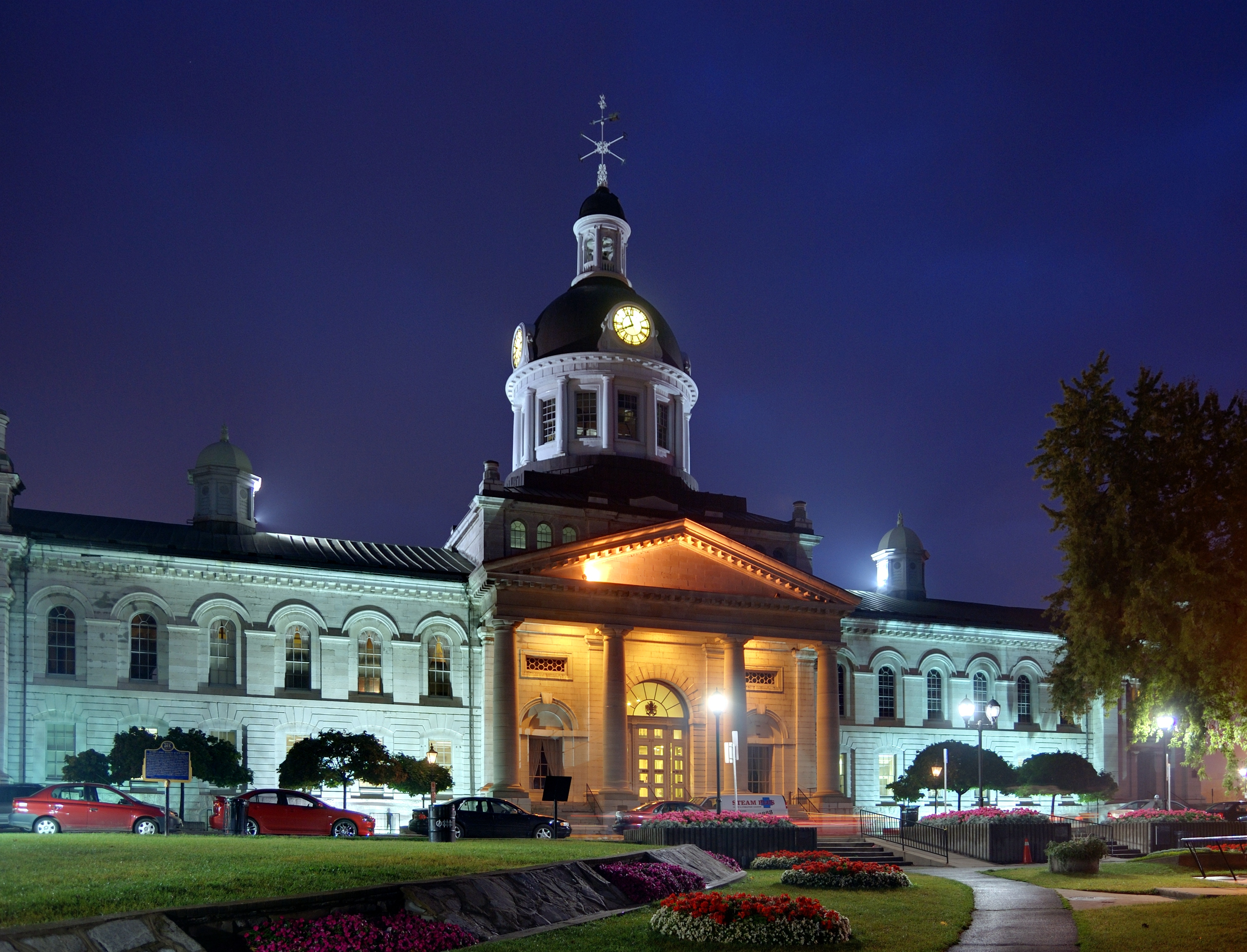
Kingston Town Hall, designed by George Browne

In nearby Napanee, it was said that every public building, including schools and churches, was built on land donated by Cartwright, including both the land and the building for the Anglican church of St. Mary Magdalene. He may have commissioned Rogers for that building as well.

In addition to Rogers, Cartwright commissioned another significant architect, George Browne, to build his country villa, Rockwood. Cartwright likely also helped Browne obtain the commission to build the Kingston Town Hall, which was designated a National Historic Site in 1961.

== Death ==
In 1843, Cartwright began to close down his farming activities. He sold off some of his property for building lots at the same time, as the town of Kingston had expanded to the area. He died at his home of tuberculosis January 15, 1845, two years after his twin brother Robert, also living in Kingston, died of the same disease. Their widows then joined households.

== Archives ==
Queen's University at Kingston holds some of Cartwright's library in its rare books collection. It includes books on philosophy, religion, literature, law, history and politics. There are several volumes of bound pamphlets, piano music, and family photographs. The Queen's University Archives also include a large collection of Cartwright family documents.

There is a Cartwright Family Fonds with the Ontario provincial archives, consisting of documents from 1799 to 1913. The documents were generated by John Solomon Cartwright, his father Richard Cartwright, his brother Reverend Robert David Cartwright, Robert's wife Harriet (Dobbs) Cartwright and their son, Sir Richard Cartwright.
