= Swazie (apple) =

Apple cultivar

Malus 'Swazie'
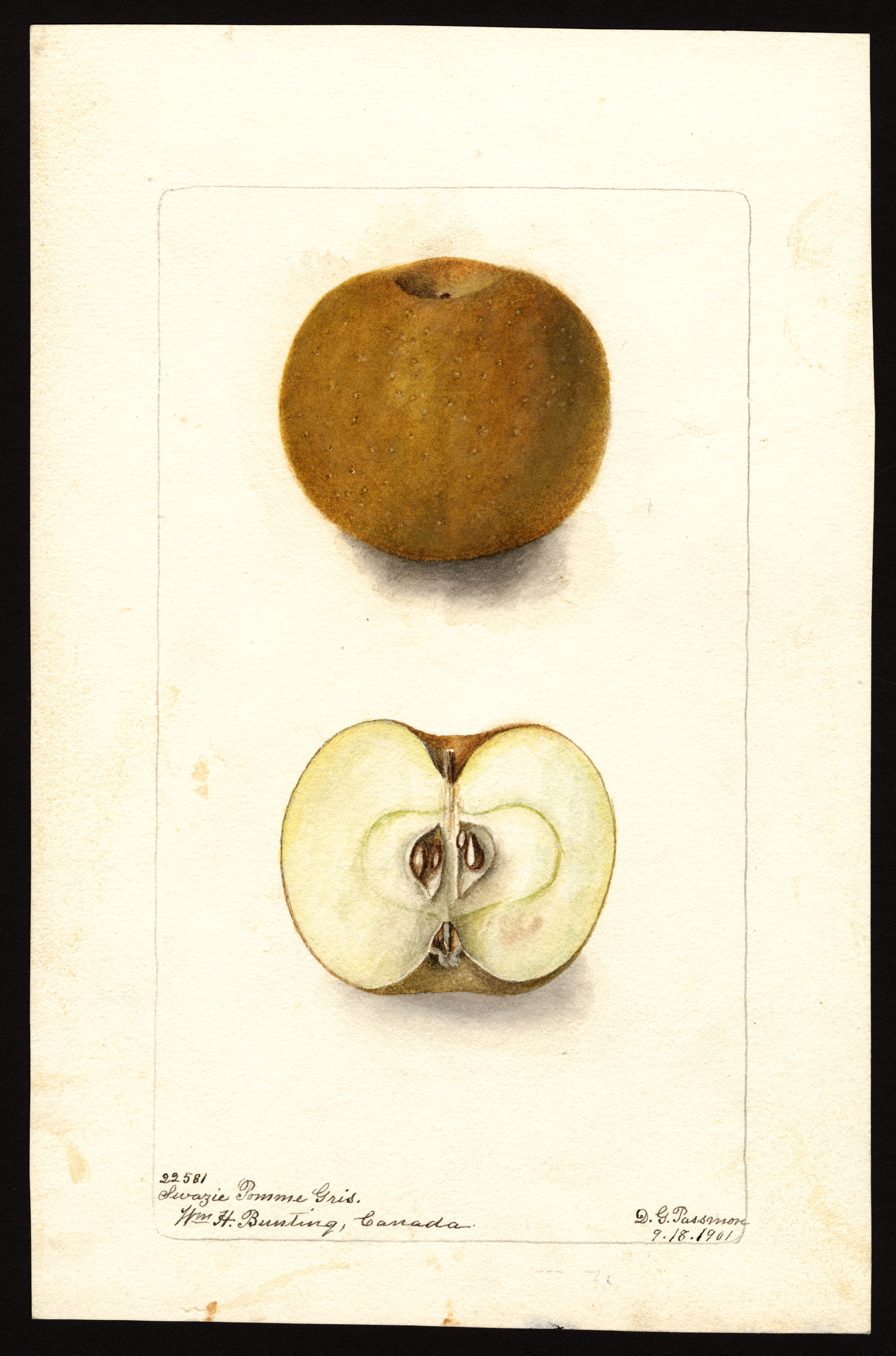
- Species: Malus pumila
- Cultivar: 'Swazie'
- Origin: Niagara, Ontario, Canada, late 18th century

The 'Swazie' apple, also called 'Pomme Grise d'Or', possibly the same as 'Golden Gray', is a high-quality small to medium-sized apple that keeps well through the winter. The original tree appeared near Niagara-on-the-Lake at the plant nursery of Isaac Swayze.

== See also ==
- Heirloom plants
