= Richard Cartwright (Loyalist) =

Merchant, judge, and politician in Upper Canada

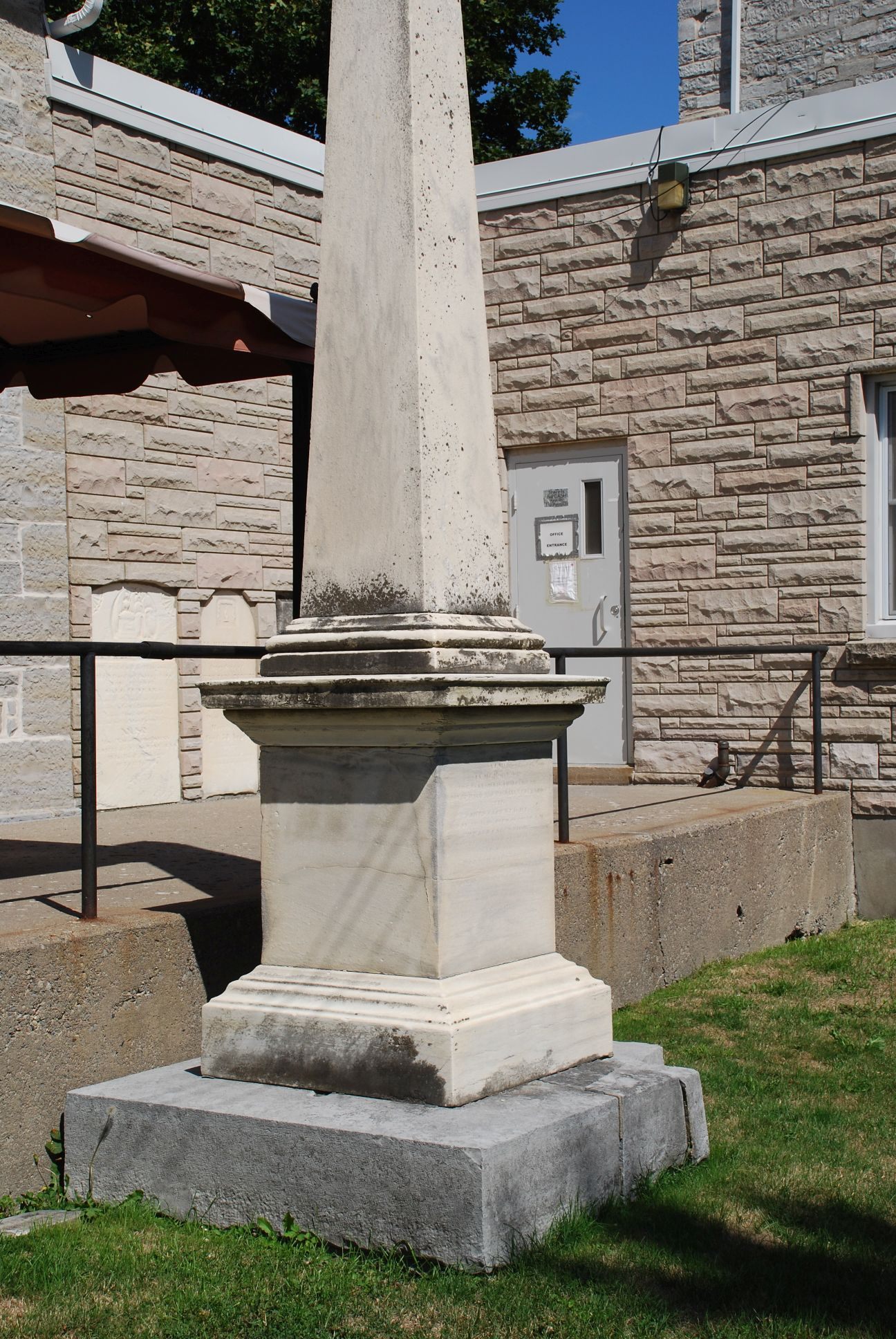
Cartwright Monument, Lower Burial Ground, Kingston, Ontario

Richard Cartwright (February 2, 1759 – July 27, 1815) was a merchant, land speculator, judge, and legislative councillor in Upper Canada. An avowed Loyalist during the American Revolution, he was forced to leave his Albany, New York home in 1777. Cartwright's account of events during his time as John Butler's secretary provides a civilian's perspective of key events in the history of the Revolutionary War including the Battle of Wyoming and the Sullivan Campaign. He became a merchant at Fort Niagara in 1780, and relocated to what is now Kingston, Ontario after the war. Cartwright was appointed a judge in the Court of Common Pleas in 1788, and a member of the Legislative Council of Upper Canada in 1792.

== Early life ==
Richard Cartwright was born in Albany on February 2, 1759. His father, also named Richard, emigrated to the Province of New York from London England in 1742. His mother, Joanne Beasley, was from a "loyal Dutch family," and his father, an innkeeper and small landowner, was deputy postmaster of Albany and an active member of the Church of England. As a boy, Cartwright suffered an injury that left him blind in one eye. Despite this Cartwright received a classical education at private primary and advanced schools in preparation for a career in the church.

== American Revolution ==
During the early years of the American Revolution, Cartwright's father attempted to stay neutral in rebel-controlled Albany. In February 1777, a letter Cartwright wrote to his sister Elizabeth at British-controlled Fort Niagara was intercepted by Albany's committee of correspondence. Cartwright was required to provide assurances of his future good behaviour. A few months later, his father arranged for Cartwright and Elizabeth's daughter Hannah to leave for British territory. Cartwright recorded his journey from Albany north to Montreal including his visit to the site of the Battles of Saratoga and Hannah's accidental dunking in Lake St. George.

Cartwright's parents were tainted by their son's loyalty to the British Crown, and were suspected of having helped Walter Butler escape captivity in April 1778. They were abused and their property was "destroyed and plundered," before they were escorted under guard to Crown Point on Lake Champlain and turned over to the British. They spent the rest of the war as refugees in Montreal but afterwards joined their son at Cataraqui, later known as Kingston.

While in Montreal, Cartwright was hired as secretary to John Butler, major-commandant of the newly formed Butler's Rangers. Cartwright's account of events during this time provide a civilian's perspective of the Ranger's activities in 1778 and 1779.

In the spring of 1778, Cartwright accompanied Butler to Tioga at the confluence of the Chemung and Susquehanna rivers in preparation for a large-scale raid on the Wyoming Valley. He appears to have remained behind at Tioga when the Rangers and their Indigenous allies defeated a body of Patriot militia at the Battle of Wyoming. Cartwright spent most of the summer of 1779 with Butler at the Seneca village of Kanadaseaga, and was with Butler when the Rangers, Brant's Volunteers, and several hundred Seneca and Cayuga warriors were defeated at the Battle of Newtown by the forces of Major General John Sullivan.

Cartwright was frequently critical of the behaviour of Britain's Indigenous allies. After the Battle of Wyoming he wrote that "the deliberate murder of prisoners after they are brought to their camp is not, it seems, reckoned among acts of cruelty by these barbarous wretches." He referred to the events of the Cherry Valley massacre as "such acts of wanton cruelty committed by the blood thirsty savages as humanity would shudder to mention. In his journal from 1779 he described Indigenous raiding parties as "bands of lurking assassins" who seek to "glut their cruelty alike with the blood of friend and foe without distinction of sex of age... it is impossible to bring them to leave women and children alone."

== Niagara and Kingston ==
In May 1780, Richard resigned his position as Butler's secretary and formed a business partnership with Robert Hamilton. At Niagara, Cartwright and Hamilton provided materials for Butler's Rangers, the British Indian Department, and the Fort Niagara garrison, and developed a reputation for reliability and honesty.

In 1783, Cartwright moved to Kingston (then known as Cataraqui) after the British had decided to move their operations there from Carleton Island. In Kingston, he continued in partnership with Hamilton supplying goods to the garrisons of Fort Niagara, Fort Detroit and Fort Mackinac, as well as Kingston's garrison and naval dockyard. His business interests expanded to manufacturing, retailing, milling, shipbuilding, and land speculation. Cartwright and Hamilton ended their partnership amicably in 1790.

Cartwright was involved in the construction of the merchant vessel Lady Dorchester in 1788 and the Governor Simcoe in 1794. He leased mills on the Cataraqui River, and purchased the mills that had been built at Napanee. By 1801, a quarter of the flour sent from Kingston to Montreal was produced by mills Cartwright controlled. Cartwright greatly expanded the amount of salt port produced at Kingston, manufactured sails for the Royal Navy during the War of 1812 and purchased The Kingston Gazette, to which he contributed articles under the pseudonym "Falkland."

Canadian historian Donald Creighton describes Cartwright as "a modest, sound and able man who built up the most important business in the province." In 1788, Cartwright was appointed a judge in the Court of Common Pleas and was named to the land board for the Mecklenburg District the following year. Lieutenant Governor John Graves Simcoe appointed Cartwright a member of the Legislative Council for the newly created province of Upper Canada in 1792. Cartwright invited John Strachan to Upper Canada to teach his sons and establish a grammar school. He was an early proponent of free trade with the United States, but opposed encouraging Americans to emigrate to the province. Unlike Simcoe, Cartwright believed that English institutions should be adapted to Upper Canada's needs.

At the time of his death at Montreal in 1815, Cartwright owned houses and businesses in Kingston, Napanee and York (Toronto) and more than 27,000 acres of land scattered throughout Upper Canada. In 1816, Cartwright Township in Durham County (now part of Scugog Township) was named for him.

== Family ==
In 1785, Cartwright married Magdalen Secord, daughter of James Secord, and future sister-in-law of Laura Secord (née Ingersoll). Richard and Magdalen had eight children. Two sons, James and Richard died in 1811, followed by their sister Hannah and brother Stephen. Richard's son, John Solomon Cartwright, became a lawyer, judge, entrepreneur and political figure in the Province of Canada. Another son, Robert Cartwright, married Harriet Dobbs, a Christian philanthropist. Richard's grandson, Sir Richard John Cartwright, became a Kingston lawyer and Canadian political figure.

== Cartwright and enslavement ==
When Richard moved from Niagara to Cataraqui he brought with him Joseph Gutches, an enslaved person who had been captured during an Indigenous raid in 1780. Gutches continued in the service of the Cartwright family until his death in 1842, although at some point he became a paid employee rather than a slave. While Cartwright was an enslaver, he supported Lieutenant Governor John Graves Simcoe's 1793 Act to Limit Slavery in Upper Canada. In 1798 when the Legislative Assembly passed a bill that would permit immigrants to Upper Canada to once again bring their slaves with them, Cartwright worked to ensured that the bill would die in the Legislative Council at the end of the parliamentary session.
