= Isaac Swayze =

British partisan and Canadian political figure

Isaac Swayze (1751 – February 11, 1828) was a Loyalist and British partisan during the American Revolution, and afterwards a politician and militia officer in Upper Canada. Swayze, the son of Caleb Swayze, was born in Roxbury, Morris County, New Jersey in 1751. The identity of his mother is uncertain. When Isaac's father died in 1794, he left a widow named Elizabeth, however, she may have been Isaac's stepmother.

== Revolutionary War ==
During the American Revolutionary War, Swayze served as a partisan for the British. He guided British forces in New York and New Jersey, provided intelligence to British authorities, escorted Loyalist refugees, passed counterfeit money, and rustled horses for the British army. He is believed to have been an associate of noted partisan James Moody. Swayze may have been the "trusted Loyalist" Moody sent to Fort Niagara in 1778 to obtain "precise intelligence" from Major John Butler of Butler's Rangers. It is possible that he was with Butler at the Battle of Wyoming in July 1778 and spent the following winter at Fort Niagara.

According to family tradition, Swayze escaped certain death several times. Later in life he told a story about how he and several others, including his brother Benjamin, had taken shelter in a barn when a group of armed Patriots arrived looking for him. Swayze hid beneath the floor boards while the barn was searched. Bayonets were thrust through the gaps between the boards but Swayze escaped injury. Anger that they couldn't find Isaac, the Patriots bayoneted and killed Benjamin. Another story tells how Swayze had been captured and sentenced to death, but had escaped by exchanging clothes with his wife during a prison visit. He apparently never saw her again.

There is documentary evidence that Swayze, his brother Caleb, and three others escaped from jail in Morristown on September 4, 1780. The sheriff of Morris Country issued a notice that described Isaac as "thirty years of age, five feet eight or nine inches high, sandy complextion, and had a scar of a bullet or swan shot in one of his temples." A substantial reward of $5000 was offered. Following a high-profile robbery in 1782, Isaac's brother Caleb was killed when his hiding place in Morris County's Great Swamp was discovered.

In April 1783, Isaac was arrested by the British authorities at New York on suspicion of having committed a robbery on Long Island. In two letters to Lieutenant General Guy Carleton, he protested that he had been "unjustly accused of robbery" and "deprived of justice" since he had been held without trial for eight weeks and as a result was unable to collect debts owing him from those evacuating from New York. A court martial acquitted Swayze in July 1783 but ordered him to leave New York. Isaac's name appears in the Book of Negroes as an escort to a Black Loyalist named James Brown. Swayze and Brown were passengers on the sloop Cato bound for Annapolis Royal, Nova Scotia in October of that year.

== Niagara ==
Swayze migrated from Nova Scotia to the Niagara region in 1784. He initially settled on 16 acres parcel of land near the mouth of Two Mile Creek adjoining the property of John Secord. He was later refused title as the land had been previously assigned to John Butler. Swayze eventually received a Crown grant for 200 acres in Niagara Township, 200 acres in Thorold Township, and 800 acres elsewhere in Upper Canada. He purchased a one-acre town lot in Newark (Niagara-on-the-Lake), as well as additional property in Niagara and Thorold townships.

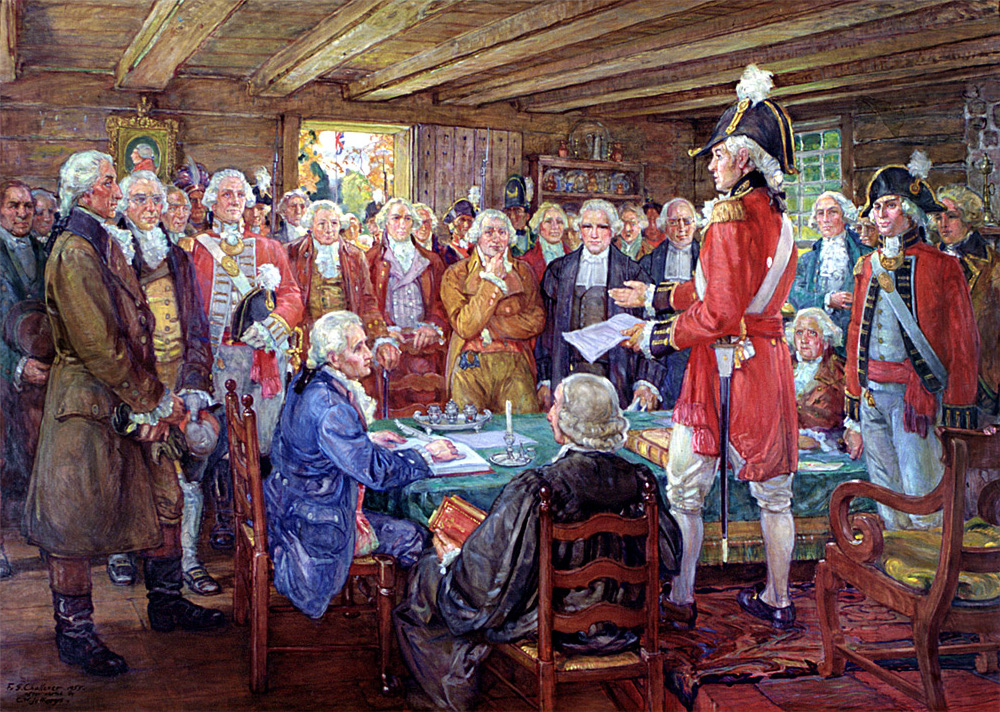
The First Legislature of Upper Canada by Frederick Sproston Challener

In 1792, Swayze was elected to the 1st Parliament of Upper Canada representing the 3rd Riding of Lincoln. In 1795, he led a protest against the wording used on deeds that some people believed would prevent the sale of their own land. He was charged with sedition and fined. Despite this he was appointed a justice of the peace in 1796. He did not run for office in 1796 but was elected again for 3rd Lincoln in 1800 following a campaign in which he was accused of being a horse thief. Swayze was elected again in 1804 but declined to run in 1808. During this time, Swayze generally supported policies that favoured farmers and small merchants rather than the rich elite.

== War of 1812 ==
During the War of 1812, Swayze raised a troop known as the Provincial Royal Artillery Drivers or "Car Brigade." An American officer commented that "the noted Isaac Swayze has received a captain's commission for the flying artillery of which they have a number of pieces." Swayze's unit, which was responsible for moving field guns and ammunition during military engagements, was present at the Battle of Queenston Heights in October 1812. Swayze received favourable mention in a letter Major General Roger Hale Sheaffe wrote to Lieutenant General George Provost after the battle, and is credited with driving the wagon that conveyed Major General Isaac Brock’s body from Queenston to Fort George.

William Hamilton Merritt, in his memoir, commented that Swayze deserved “the greatest credit for his indefatigable exertions” during the war. Swayze lost his house and barn in December 1813 when the Americans burned Niagara. After the war Swayze claimed several hundred pounds in damages.

== Later career ==
In 1814, Swayze was appointed to represent 4th Lincoln in the Legislative Assembly following the death of the incumbent, John Fanning. He continued to represent 4th Lincoln following the election of 1816. He was a vocal opponent of the reformer Robert Gourlay. In 1818 he brought charges of seditious libel against the editor of the Niagara Spectator for publishing an address authored by Gourlay. Swayze was instrumental in Gourlay's arrest for sedition that same year. Gourlay was imprisoned for eight months and later banished. Gourlay once asked, "How could such a man as Isaac Swayze be elected, and repeatedly elected?"

== Personal life ==
Swayze married three times and fathered eight children. He married Bertha Luce in Morris County in the spring of 1775. It is alleged that Isaac abandoned Bertha when he left the United States and that she was still alive when he married Sarah Secord in 1776. Sarah was the daughter of John Secord Sr. who had served in Butler's Rangers during the Revolutionary War. After Sarah's death in 1804, Swayze married Lena Hill, the widow of Elijah Ferris.

Swayze was active in bringing members of his family to Upper Canada from New Jersey after the Revolutionary War. His son Benjamin joined him, as did the children of his brother Caleb. A cousin, Israel Swayze, also brought his family to the Niagara region and settled in Thorold Township. Israel Swayze is believed to have been the progenitor of the apple known as the Swayze Pomme Gris.

Isaac Swayze retired from public life following his defeat in the 1820 election. He died in Queenston on 24 Mar 1828.
