= George Hill Detlor =

Upper Canada politician

George Hill Detlor (1794–1883) was a merchant and political figure in Upper Canada. He represented Lennox and Addington in the Legislative Assembly of Upper Canada from 1836 to 1841 as a Conservative member.

He was born in Upper Canada, the son of John Detlor and Jerusha Simons, both United Empire Loyalists. He was educated by the Reverend John Strachan. Detlor married Maria Roblin, the sister of David Roblin. He lived first at Kingston, then later at Napanee and Brighton. Detlor served in the militia later becoming captain. He was a justice of the peace and coroner for the Midland District.
