= Harriet Dobbs =

Irish-Canadian philanthropist (1808–1887)

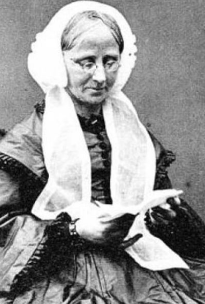
- Harriet Dobbs, later in life.
- Born: August 27, 1808; Dublin
- Died: May 14, 1887 (aged 78); Kingston, Ontario
- Other name: Harriet Dobbs Cartwright
- Known for: Philanthropic work in Kingston, 1830s-1880s
- Children: Richard John Cartwright

Harriet Dobbs (August 27, 1808 – May 14, 1887), later Harriet Dobbs Cartwright, was an Irish-born Canadian philanthropist.

== Early life ==
Harriet Dobbs, a member of the family of Castle Dobbs, County Antrim, was born in Dublin. Her parents were Conway Edward Dobbs, a barrister, and Maria Sophia Dobbs. She married Robert Cartwright, from Kingston, Upper Canada, in Dublin in 1832, and moved with her husband to Kingston in 1833. Robert was the son of Richard Cartwright, a United Empire Loyalist. His twin brother, John Solomon Cartwright, became a respected lawyer, banker, businessman and politician.

== In Canada ==
Because her husband was an Anglican clergyman, assistant to Archdeacon George Okill Stuart, Dobbs was soon drawn into church and charity work in Kingston. She taught Bible study classes and Sunday school, held sewing and choir group meetings in her home, and joined the Female Benevolent Society of Kingston (FBS). She managed the society's hospital along with others, and organized the annual fundraising bazaar. She also painted portraits to raise money for the FBS. After a fire closed the society's works for a few years, she restarted the FBS in 1839, as a charity focused on visiting, temperance, and caring for the city's poor.

Harriet Dobbs was secretary of the Orphans' Home and Widows' Friend Society for 31 years, fundraising and overseeing an orphanage, school, and women's workshop. She visited women in prison, advocated for them, and organized Christmas parties for them with her brother, Francis Dobbs, a prison chaplain.

Harriet Dobbs Cartwright was also a skilled watercolourist.

== Personal life ==
Dobbs married Robert David Cartwright in Dublin. He was the son of Richard Cartwright of Kingston, Upper Canada. They had a daughter and four sons; one of their sons was banker and politician Richard John Cartwright, who served in the federal Cabinet under Sir Wilfrid Laurier. Her first son died in infancy. She was widowed when Rev. Cartwright died from tuberculosis in 1843, and she died in 1887, aged 78 years; her grave is in Cataraqui Cemetery in Kingston.

Her husband's twin brother, John Solomon Cartwright, was a well-respected businessman, lawyer and judge. He also died of tuberculosis, two years after her husband.

== Archives ==
There is a Cartwright Family Fonds with the Ontario provincial archives, consisting of documents from 1799 to 1913. The documents were generated by Richard Cartwright, his sons John Solomon Cartwright and the Reverend Robert David Cartwright, Robert's wife Harriet (Dobbs) Cartwright and their son, Sir Richard Cartwright.
