= List of United States political families (N) =

The following is an alphabetical list of political families in the United States whose last name begins with N.

== The Nareys ==
- Harry E. Narey (1885–1962), Attorney of Dickinson County, Iowa 1914–20; delegate to the Iowa Republican Convention 1916 1920 1924 1928 1932 1936 1940 1944 1948 1952 1956 1960; Attorney of Spirit Lake, Iowa 1918–43; Chairman of the Dickinson County, Iowa Republican Committee 1918–43; U.S. Representative from Iowa 1942–43; Iowa District Court Judge 1944–59. Father of Peter B. Narey.
  - Peter B. Narey (1920–2008), Iowa Republican Committeeman 1971. Son of Harry E. Narey.

== The Neelys ==
- Matthew M. Neely (1874–1958), Mayor of Fairmont, West Virginia 1908–10; U.S. Representative from West Virginia 1913–21 1945–47; U.S. Senator from West Virginia 1923–29 1931–41 1949–58; candidate for U.S. Senate from West Virginia 1942; delegate to the Democratic National Convention 1932 1936 1940 1944 1952 1956; Governor of West Virginia 1941–45. Grandfather of Richard Neely.
  - Richard Neely (1941–2020), West Virginia House Delegate 1971–72, Judge of the West Virginia Supreme Court of Appeals 1973–95. Grandson of Matthew M. Neely.

== The Nelsons ==
- Roger Nelson (1759–1815), Maryland House Delegate 1795 1801–02, Maryland State Senator 1803–04, U.S. Representative from Maryland 1804–10, Justice in Maryland. Father of John Nelson.
  - John Nelson (1791–1860), U.S. Representative from Maryland 1821–23, Maryland State Senator 1826–29 1830, U.S. Chargé d'Affaires to Two Sicilies 1831–32, Attorney General of the United States 1843–45, acting U.S. Secretary of State 1844. Son of Roger Nelson.

== The Nelsons of Maine ==
- John E. Nelson (1874–1955), U.S. Representative from Maine 1922–33. Father of Charles P. Nelson.
  - Charles P. Nelson (1907–1962), delegate to the Republican National Convention 1936, Mayor of Augusta, Maine 1947–48; U.S. Representative from Maine 1949–57. Son of John E. Nelson.

== The Nelsons of New York ==
The Nelson family is a family of English origin from New York. unlike other branches of the family, The New York Nelsons have been fortunate in keeping an unbroken line of descent. The first known ancestor was John Nelson, who settled first in Flat Lands and later in Mamaroneck. He was of Puritan stock and is believed to have traveled from Norfolk to New York between 1660 and 1665. Descendents of the Nelson family include Gouverneur K. Warren, Emily Warren Roebling, Lily James, and Helen Horton, as well as various government officials and businessmen.

The Nelson family has spread across the United States and Canada and has married into families including Gedney, Secord, and Henderson.

- William Nelson was the great-great-grandson of John Nelson. He was a lawyer and politician who represented New York in the US Congress from 1847 to 1851. He was a Whig and a friend of Henry Clay, Daniel Webster, and Abraham Lincoln.
- Cornelius Warren was the great-great-grandson of John Nelson. He represented New York's 8th district in the United States House of Representatives from 1847 to 1849.
- Isaac De Groff Nelson was a 5th generation descendent. He was an Indiana pioneer, politician, and businessman who held several political offices.
- Homer Augustus Nelson was a 6th generation descendent. He was a Union officer during the American Civil War and served one time in the House of Representatives.

== The Nelsons of Virginia ==
- Thomas Nelson Jr. (1738–1789), member of the Virginia Colony House of Burgesses 1774, delegate to the Virginia Colony Convention 1774, Delegate to the Continental Congress from Virginia 1775–77 1779, Governor of Virginia 1781. Father of Hugh Nelson.
  - Hugh Nelson (1768–1836), Virginia State Senator 1786–91, Virginia House Delegate 1805–09 1828–29, Judge of the Virginia General Court, U.S. Representative from Virginia 1811–23, U.S. Minister to Spain 1823–24. Son of Thomas Nelson Jr.

== The Nelsons and Norris ==
- George W. Norris (1861–1944), District Court Judge in Nebraska 1896–1903, U.S. Representative from Nebraska 1903–13, U.S. Senator from Nebraska 1913–43. Grandfather of Harvey Frans Nelson Jr.
  - Harvey Frans Nelson Jr. (1924–2021), U.S. Ambassador to Swaziland 1985–88. Grandson of George W. Norris.

== The Nesses and Richardsons ==
- Julius B. Ness (1916–1991), Associate Justice of South Carolina 1974–85, Chief Justice of South Carolina 1985–88.
  - Julius N. Richardson (born 1976), Judge of the United States Court of Appeals for the Fourth Circuit 2018–present. Grandson of Julius B. Ness.

== The Neubergers ==
- Richard L. Neuberger (1912–1960), Oregon State Representative 1941–42, Oregon State Senator 1949–54, U.S. Senator from Oregon 1955–60.
- Maurine Neuberger (1907–2000), U.S. Senator from Oregon 1960–67. Wife of Richard L. Neuberger.

== The Neumanns ==
- Robert G. Neumann (1916–1999), U.S. Ambassador to Afghanistan 1966–73, U.S. Ambassador to Morocco 1973–76, U.S. Ambassador to Saudi Arabia 1981. Father of Ronald E. Neumann.
  - Ronald E. Neumann (born 1944), U.S. Ambassador to Algeria 1994–97, U.S. Ambassador to Bahrain 2001, U.S. Ambassador to Afghanistan 2005–07. Son of Robert G. Neumann.

== The Nevilles ==
- J. C. Neville (1815–1898), District Attorney of Brown County, Wisconsin; City Attorney of Green Bay, Wisconsin; Wisconsin State Assemblyman; Mayor of Green Bay, Wisconsin 1880. Father of Arthur C. Neville.
  - Arthur C. Neville (1850–1929), Mayor of Green Bay, Wisconsin 1888–89. Son of J. C. Neville.

NOTE: Arthur C. Neville was also great-nephew by marriage of U.S. President Martin Van Buren.

== The News ==
- John C. New (1831–1906), Indiana State Senator 1863, Chairman of the Indiana Republican Party 1880–82. Father of Harry S. New.
  - Harry S. New (1858–1937), delegate to the Republican National Convention 1896 1912 1920 1924, Indiana State Senator 1897–99, Republican National Committeeman 1900–12, Chairman of the Republican National Committee 1907–08, U.S. Senator from Indiana 1917–23, Postmaster General of the United States 1923–29. Son of John Chalfant New.

== The Newberrys ==
- John Stoughton Newberry (1826–1887), U.S. Representative from Michigan 1879–81. Father of Truman Handy Newberry.
  - Truman Handy Newberry (1864–1945), U.S. Secretary of the Navy 1908–09, U.S. Senator from Michigan 1919–22. Son of John Stoughton Newberry.
    - Carol Newberry Brooks, Michigan Republican Committeewoman. Daughter to Truman Handy Newberry.

== The Newhouses ==
- Irv Newhouse (1920–2001), Washington State Representative 1965–1980, Washington State Senator 1980–1999. Father of Dan Newhouse.
  - Dan Newhouse (born 1955), Washington State Representative 2003–2009, Director of the Washington State Department of Agriculture 2009–2013, U.S. Representative from Washington 2015–present. Son of Irv Newhouse.

== The Newlands and Sharons ==
- William Sharon (1821–1885), U.S. Senator from Nevada 1875–81. Father-in-law of Francis G. Newlands.
  - Francis G. Newlands (1848–1917), U.S. Representative from Nevada 1983–03, U.S. Senator from Nevada 1903–17, delegate to the Democratic National Convention 1916. Son-in-law of William Sharon.

== The Newsoms ==
- William Newsom (1934–2018), retired California appeals court judge and administrator of the Getty family trust
  - Gavin Newsom (born 1967), mayor of San Francisco and Lieutenant Governor of California, 40th Governor of California.

== The Niblacks ==
- William E. Niblack (1822–1893), Surveyor of Dubois County, Indiana; Indiana State Representative 1849–50 1862–63; Indiana State Senator 1850–53; Circuit Court Judge in Indiana 1854–59; U.S. Representative from Indiana 1857–61 1865–75; delegate to the Democratic National Convention 1864 1868 1876; Justice of the Indiana Supreme Court 1877–89. Cousin of Silas L. Niblack.
- Silas L. Niblack (1825–1883), Probate Court Judge in Columbia County, Florida; U.S. Representative from Florida 1873; Florida State Senator 1879. Cousin of William E. Niblack.
  - Mason Jenks Niblack (1857–1926), Indiana State Representative 1897–1901 1915. Son of William E. Niblack.

== The Nices ==
- Harry Nice (1877–1941), candidate for Governor of Maryland 1919, delegate to the Republican National Convention 1920, Governor of Maryland 1935–39, candidate for Republican nomination for Vice President of the United States 1936, candidate for U.S. Senate from Maryland 1940. Uncle of Deeley K. Nice.
  - Deeley K. Nice (1910–1956), candidate for Mayor of Baltimore, Maryland 1947; delegate to the Republican National Convention 1948 1952; Judge of the Baltimore, Maryland Supreme Bench 1954–56. Nephew of Harry Nice.
    - Harry W. Nice III (born 1935), Maryland House Delegate 1967–70. Son of Deeley K. Nice.

== The Nicholas, Carters, and Randolphs ==
- Robert Carter I (1663–1732), acting Governor of Virginia 1726–27. Grandfather of Robert Carter Nicholas Sr.
  - Robert Carter Nicholas Sr. (1728/1729-1780), member of the Virginia House of Burgesses 1755–61 1766–75, Virginia Assemblyman 1776–79, Judge of the Virginia Court of Appeals. Grandson of Robert Carter I.
    - George Nicholas (c. 1754–1799), Attorney General of Kentucky, son of Robert Carter Nicholas Sr.
    - Wilson Cary Nicholas (1761–1820), Governor of Virginia, son of Robert Carter Nicholas Sr.
    - John Nicholas (1764–1819), congressman from Virginia, New York State Senator; son of Robert Carter Nicholas Sr.
    - Edmund Randolph (1753–1813), Delegate to the Continental Congress from Virginia 1779–82, Governor of Virginia 1786–88, Attorney General of the United States 1789–94, U.S. Secretary of State 1794–95. Son-in-law of Robert Carter Nicholas Sr.
      - Robert C. Nicholas (1793–1857), U.S. Senator from Louisiana 1836–41, Louisiana Secretary of State 1843–46. Son of George Nicholas
      - Robert C. Nicholas (1801–1854), New York Assembly 1828, 1829, 1830 and 1832; New York State Senate 1839–42; Son of John Nicholas
      - Peyton Randolph (governor) (1779–1828), Acting Governor of Virginia 1811–12; son of Edmund Randolph

== The Niedringhaus ==
- Frederick G. Niedringhaus (1837–1922), U.S. Representative from Missouri 1889–91. Father of Thomas Key Niedringhaus.
  - Thomas Key Niedringhaus (1860–1924), Republican National Committeeman 1912–16. Son of Frederick G. Niedringhaus.
  - Henry F. Niedringhaus (1864–1941), U.S. Representative from Missouri 1927–33. Nephew of Frederick G. Niedringhaus.

== The Nielsons ==
- Howard C. Nielson (1924–2020), Utah State Representative 1967–75, U.S. Representative from Utah 1983–91, Utah State Senator 1997–2001.
  - Howard C. Nielson Jr. (born 1968), Judge of the United States District Court for the District of Utah 2019–present. Son of Howard C. Nielson.
  - Jim Nielson, Utah State Representative. Son of Howard C. Nielson.

== The Nixes ==
- Robert N.C. Nix Sr. (1898–1987), delegate to the Democratic National Convention 1956, U.S. Representative from Pennsylvania 1958–79. Father of Robert N.C. Nix Jr.
  - Robert N.C. Nix Jr. (1928–2003), Judge of the Philadelphia, Pennsylvania Court of Common Pleas 1967–71; Justice of the Pennsylvania Supreme Court 1971–84; Chief Justice of the Pennsylvania Supreme Court 1984–96. Son of Robert N.C. Nix Sr.

== The Nighs ==
- George Nigh (1927–2025), member of the Oklahoma House of Representatives (1951–1959), lieutenant governor of Oklahoma (1959–1963; 1967–1979), governor of Oklahoma (1963; 1979–1987). Brother of William Nigh.
- William Nigh (1920–2008), member of the Oklahoma House of Representatives (1965–1969). Brother of George Nigh.

== The Nixons and Coxes ==
- Richard Nixon (1913–1994), U.S. Representative from California 1947–50, U.S. Senator from California 1950–53, Vice President of the United States 1953–61, candidate for President of the United States, 1960, candidate for Governor of California, 1962, President of the United States 1969–74. Father-in-law of Edward F. Cox.
  - Edward F. Cox (born 1946), candidate for Republican nomination for the U.S. Senate, 2006, withdrew nomination. Son-in-law of Richard Nixon.
    - Christopher Nixon Cox (born 1979), candidate for Republican nomination for New York's 1st congressional district, 2010. Son of Edward F. Cox.

NOTE: Nixon's daughter, Julie, is granddaughter-in-law of U.S. President Dwight D. Eisenhower.

== The Nobles ==
- James Noble (1785–1831), Indiana Territory 1813–14, Indiana Territory Councilman 1815, Indiana Circuit Court Judge 1815, delegate to the Indiana Constitutional Convention 1816, Indiana State Representative 1816, U.S. Senator from Indiana 1816–31. Brother of Noah Noble and Benjamin Sedgwick Noble.
- Noah Noble (1794–1844), Indiana State Representative 1825, Governor of Indiana 1831–37, candidate for U.S. Senate from Indiana 1836 1838. Brother of James Noble and Benjamin Sedgwick Noble.
- Benjamin Sedgwick Noble (1809–1869), Indiana State Representative 1837–38. Brother of James Noble and Noah Noble.
  - Benjamin Sedgwick Noble (1805–1837), Indiana State Representative 1829–30 1831–32 1833–34. Son of James Noble.

== The Nobles of Michigan ==
- David A. Noble (1802–1876), Recorder of Monroe, Michigan 1838 1839 1844–50; Michigan State Representative 1847–48; Mayor of Monroe, Michigan 1852; Monroe, Michigan Alderman; Prosecuting Attorney of Monroe County, Michigan; Probate Court Judge in Monroe County, Michigan; U.S. Representative from Michigan 1853–55; delegate to the Democratic National Convention 1864. Father of Henry Shaw Noble and John Savage Noble.
  - Henry Shaw Noble, Mayor of Monroe, Michigan 1879–80 1883–84. Son of David A. Noble.
  - John Savage Noble, Probate Court Judge in Michigan. Son of David A. Noble.

== The Noells ==
- John William Noell (1816–1863), Clerk of Perry County, Missouri Circuit Court 1841–50; Missouri State Senator 1851–55; U.S. Representative from Missouri 1859–63. Father of Thomas E. Noell.
  - Thomas E. Noell (1839–1863), U.S. Representative from Missouri 1865–67. Son of John William Noell.

== The Nolans ==
- John I. Nolan (1874–1922), U.S. Representative from California 1913–1922.
- Mae Nolan (1886–1973), U.S. Representative from California 1923–1925. Wife of John I. Nolan.

== The Norblads ==
- A.W. Norblad (1881–1960), District Attorney of Delta County, Michigan; Attorney of Astoria, Oregon 1910–15; Oregon State Senator; candidate for U.S. Representative from Oregon 1922; Governor of Oregon 1929–31. Father of A. Walter Norblad.
  - A. Walter Norblad (1908–1964), Oregon State Representative 1935–37, delegate to the Republican National Convention 1940, U.S. Representative from Oregon 1946–64. Son of A.W. Norblad.
    - Albin W. Norblad (1939–2014), Municipal Court Judge in Oregon, Oregon Circuit Court Judge. Son of A. Walter Norblad.

== The Noricks ==
- James H. Norick, Mayor of Oklahoma City, Oklahoma 1959–63 1967–71. Father of Ron Norick.
  - Ron Norick, Mayor of Oklahoma City, Oklahoma 1987–98. Son of James H. Norick.

== The Norrells ==
- William F. Norrell (1896–1961), Arkansas State Senator 1930–38, U.S. Representative from Arkansas 1939–1961.
- Catherine Dorris Norrell (1901–1981), U.S. Representative from Arkansas 1961–1963. Wife of William F. Norrell.

== The Norrises ==
- William Wiley Norris, III (1936–2016), lawyer in West Monroe, Louisiana, who served as city attorney and city and state court judge, with service from 1981 to 2002 on the Louisiana Court of Appeal for the Second Circuit. Brother of Dave Norris
- Dave Norris (born 1942), the mayor of West Monroe, Louisiana, since 1978; holds the longest tenure of any in that position. Brother of Judge William Norris, III.

== The Northams ==
- Wescott Northam, Accomack County, Virginia Judge, Commonwealth's Attorney in Virginia. Father of Ralph Northam.
  - Ralph Northam (born 1959), Virginia State Senator 2008–2014, Lieutenant Governor of Virginia 2014–2018, Governor of Virginia 2018–2022. Son of Wescott Northam.

== The Nottses ==
- Charles C. Nott (1827–1916), Judge of the Court of Claims 1865–96, Chief Justice of the Court of Claims 1896–1905.
  - Charles Cooper Nott Jr. (1869–1957), judge of the New York General Sessions Court 1913–39. Son of Charles C. Nott.

== The Nungessers ==
- William Aicklen "Billy" Nungesser (1929–2006), chairman of the Republican Party of Louisiana 1988–92
  - William Harold "Billy" Nungesser (born 1959), president of Plaquemines Parish, Louisiana 2007–2015, Lieutenant Governor of Louisiana 2016–present. Son of William Aicklen "Billy" Nungesser

== The Nunns and Vinsons ==
- Carl Vinson (1883–1981), Georgia State Representative 1910–14, U.S. Representative from Georgia 1914–65. Granduncle of Samuel A. Nunn Jr.
  - Samuel A. Nunn Jr. (born 1938), Georgia State Representative 1968–72, U.S. Senator from Georgia 1972–97. Grandnephew of Carl Vinson.
    - Michelle Nunn (born 1966) Democratic nominee for U. S. Senator from Georgia, 2014. Daughter of Sam Nunn.

== The Nyes ==
- Wallace G. Nye (1859–1926), Mayor of Minneapolis, Minnesota 1913–17. Uncle of Gerald Nye.
  - Gerald Nye (1892–1971), candidate for U.S. Representative from North Dakota 1924, U.S. Senator from North Dakota 1925–45, candidate for U.S. Senate from North Dakota 1946. Nephew of Wallace G. Nye.

== Bibliography ==
- Cortez, Nelson (2022-10-27). The Nelson Family. Creative Media Partners, LLC. ISBN 978-1-01-701625-3
