= David Secord =

Canadian military officer and politician

- Born: 1759; Westchester County, New York
- Died: August 9, 1844; St. Davids, Upper Canada
- Military career
- Allegiance: British Empire
- Branch: Lincoln Militia
- Service years: 1777–1814
- Rank: Major
- Units: Butler's Rangers; 2nd Regiment of Lincoln Militia
- Conflicts: Battle of Fort Stanwix; Battle of Wyoming; Battle of Chippawa; Battle of Lundy's Lane

David Secord (August 1759 – August 9, 1844) was a military officer, merchant, and political figure in Upper Canada.

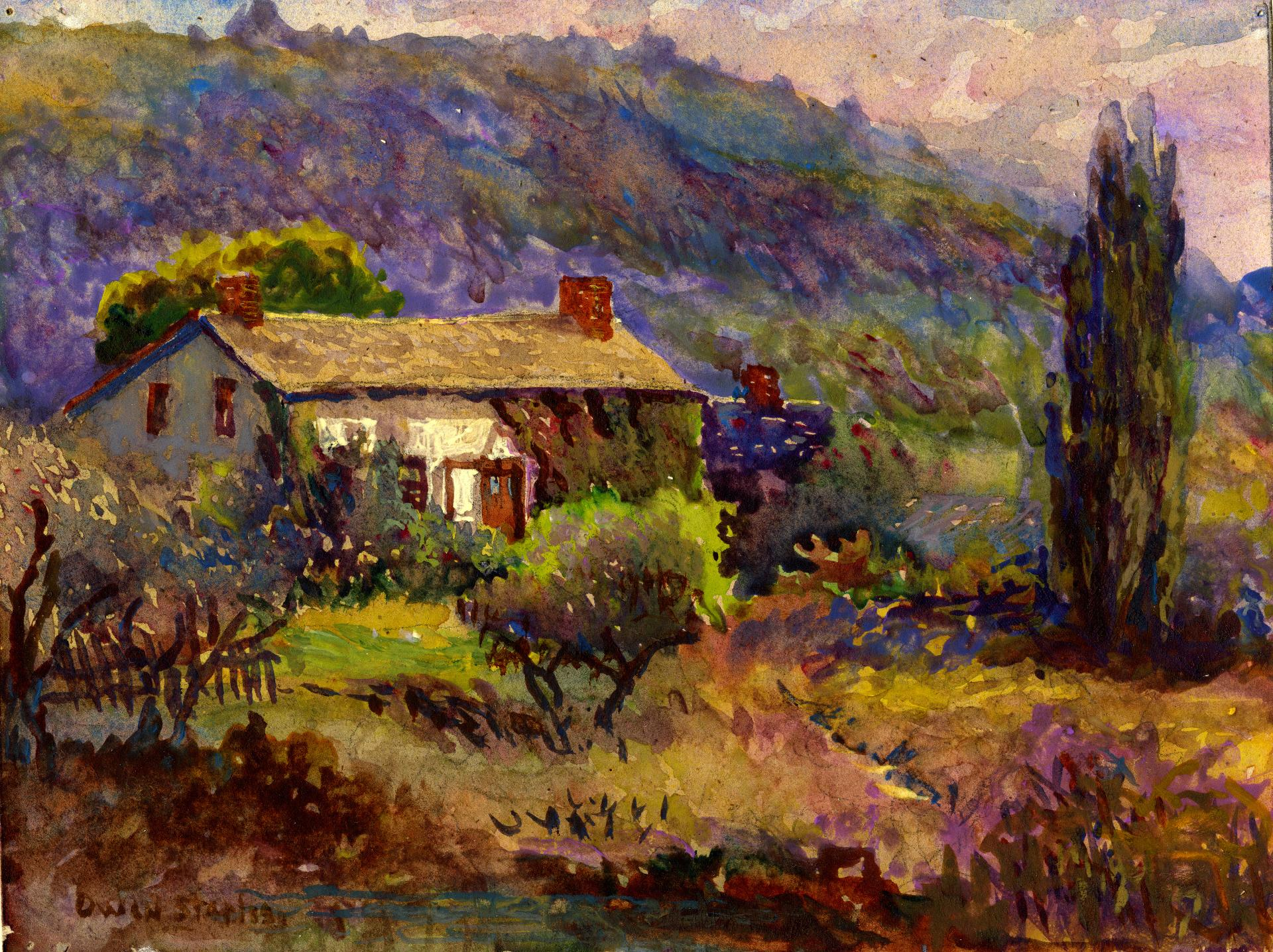
David Secord's House, St. David's (Niagara-on-the-Lake, Ontario)

David Secord, the son of James Secord (1732-1784), was born in Westchester County, New York. About 1775, he migrated with his family to the North Branch of the Susquehanna River. During the American Revolution, he joined the British Indian Department at Fort Niagara in April 1777 along with his father and older brothers. Secord was wounded at the Battle of Fort Stanwix. He transferred to Butler's Rangers upon its formation in September 1777. After the Battle of Wyoming, he was tasked with guarding three American prisoners. According to family tradition, the prisoners had been part of a party that had attacked a Mohawk village and killed the wife of Oneida Joseph. When Joseph heard that the murderers were prisoners, he demanded to be allowed to kill them. Secord would not permit it, to which the Chief replied, "I kill them or kill you," as he thrust his spear through Secord's coat. He was later promoted to corporal and then sergeant. After the war, he settled on Four Mile Creek to the west of Fort Niagara.

David helped establish the community of St David's (now part of the town of Niagara-on-the-Lake), where he built a sawmill, gristmill, smithy, and general store. Secord was appointed a justice of the peace for the Home District in 1796 and represented 2nd Lincoln in the 5th Parliament of Upper Canada from 1809 to 1812. During the War of 1812, Secord served as a Major in the 2nd Regiment of Lincoln Militia. He claimed to have fought in every significant engagement in the Niagara region during the War of 1812. On July 5, 1814, he was with his regiment at the Battle of Chippewa, where the 2nd Lincoln suffered heavy casualties. His buildings at St. David's were destroyed two weeks later by the Americans. Secord was in command of the regiment at the Battle of Lundy's Lane on July 25, 1814.

Secord represented 3rd Lincoln in the 7th Parliament from 1817 to 1820. He died at St. David's in 1844 and was buried in the Methodist cemetery.
