= Effingham, Ontario =

Effingham
- Unincorporated community
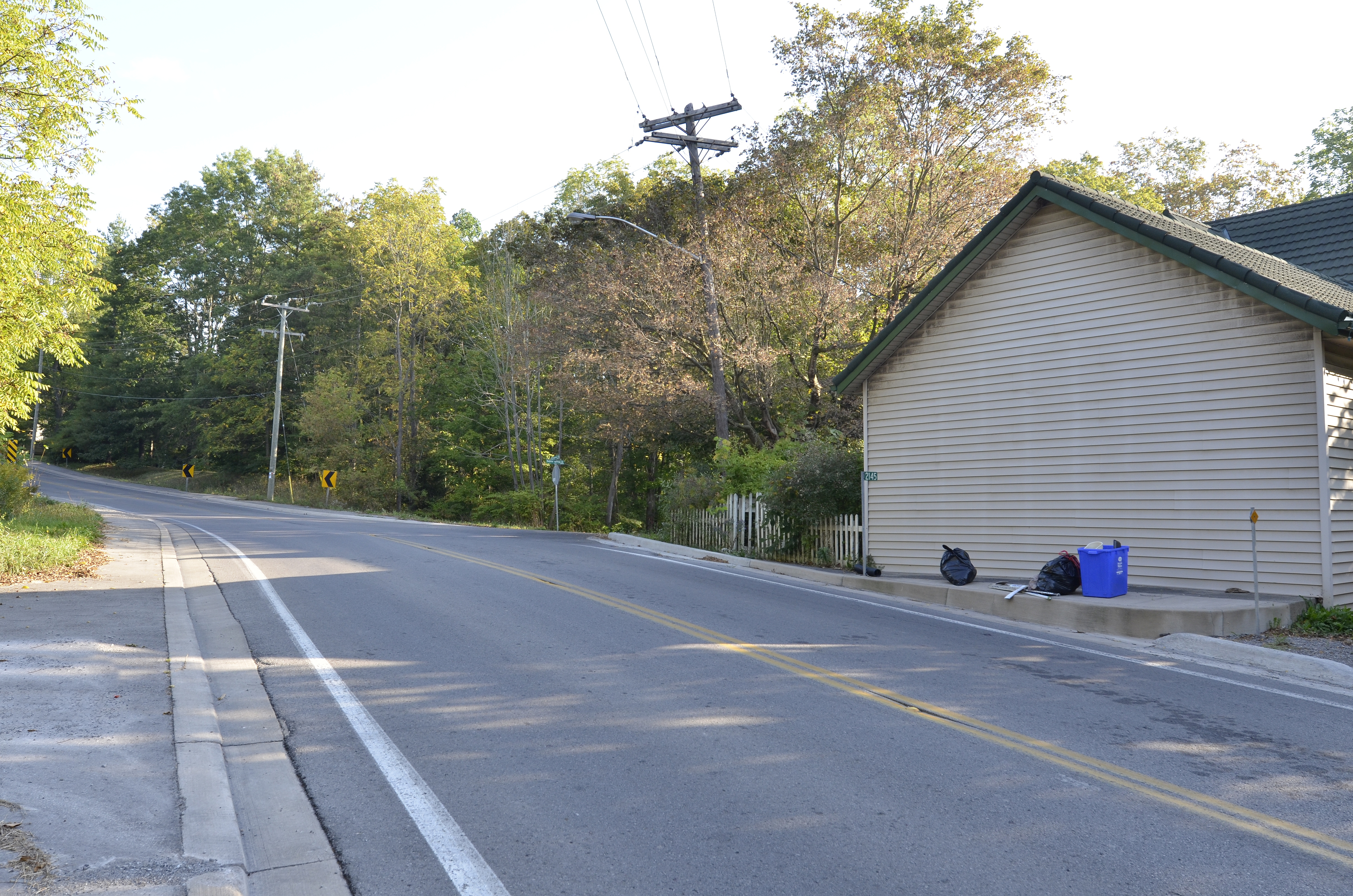
- Looking north on Effingham Street in Effingham
- Interactive map of Effingham
- Coordinates: 43°4′28″N 79°18′26″W
- Country: Canada
- Province: Ontario
- Regional municipality: Niagara
- Town: Pelham
- Settled: 1809
- Time zone: UTC-5 (EST)
  - Summer (DST): UTC-4 (EDT)
- Forward sortation area: L0S 1M0
- Area codes: 905 and 289
- NTS Map: 030M03
- GNBC Code: FBBVG

Effingham is a hamlet on 12 Mile Creek, in the northern part of the Town of Pelham in Ontario, Canada. Located on the Niagara Escarpment, it has few roads which wind through the Escarpment's forests.

Like the neighbouring community of St. Johns in Thorold, Effingham sits on the edge of Short Hills Provincial Park. The St. Johns Conservation Area, maintained by the Niagara Peninsula Conservation Authority, is located nearby.

== History ==
Effingham began as a small Quaker settlement early in Niagara's history. Situated in the Short Hills of Pelham, it owed its beginnings to David Secord, brother-in-law to Laura Secord, who had arrived shortly after 1783. As a Butler's Ranger, Secord was entitled to a land grant of 400 acres (1.6 km^{2}). The patent issued on 8 July 1799. The tract was composed mainly of wooded hills divided by spring-fed streams. Secord harnessed the water power of the fast flowing streams to run a grist mill at what has since become the neighbouring hamlet of St. Johns, only the second mill to be built in Upper Canada.

Secord had cleared 10 acres (4 ha) and planted apple trees, which were already bearing fruit, when the Loyalist and Quaker Samuel Beckett arrived on the scene. Beckett was to be the forerunner of many Quakers who would settle in Pelham. Secord sold his entire grant to Beckett on 13 October 1809 for GBP£687/10s. Beckett proceeded to build a saw mill. Besides the grist mill, a woollen factory and fulling mill are recorded, and eventually the bustling milling centre became known as "Beckett's Mills". The original Beckett home is still in good condition, and its present owner is only its fourth since 1795.

The fast running streams of the Twelve Mile Creek system were a source of power and the soil was excellent for farming and growing wheat. The grist mills of Beckett's Mills and St. Johns served the farmers throughout the region. In 1850, Beckett's Mills was renamed "Effingham" and a post office was established. Effingham boasted a general store, post office, a Quaker church, a blacksmith shop and a carriage shop. In spite of exterior forces, such as the first Welland Canal and the railways by-passing St. Johns, Effingham was still able to be a busy milling community. By 1854, however, the effects of the second Welland canal, more railways and American imported wheat from Ohio forced the community to change to cash crops of fruit, vegetables and dairy products. Effingham slowly declined as a regional centre.

Today, the mills are gone. Fierce storms in 1935 washed out the mill dams and sent a flood of water through the valley, destroying many bridges. Of the many millponds where ducks and geese once paddled, only broken-down mill races are still to be found.

== Poem ==
The poem "Effingham" by Brown from 1912 captures the spirit of the hamlet:

Low nestled in the Pelham Hills
Where angrily the Twelve Mile spills,
Her crystal flood o'er earth confine
Then rushes on as if on time:
And not unlike the sportive steed
It races down through vale and mead
Impatient in its onward flow
To swell Ontario's tide below.

Here let me rest, 'neath maple shade
Of charming bowers of nature made,
And whether I gaze on vine-clad hill
Or two-fold pond and rustic mill
In all around I find a scene
For artist's brush and poet's theme.

No crowded walk or busy street
But you stop and talk to whom you meet
On grass fringed path up to the store,
Or to the church with welcome door-
A spot where simple joys abound
And peace and plenty abound
Where life is real and not a sham,
Believe me, this is Effingham.
