= Short Hills =

Short Hills may refer to:

- Short Hills, New Jersey, community in Essex County, New Jersey, United States
- Short Hills Provincial Park, park in Ontario, Canada
- Short Hills Bench, a sub-appellation of the Niagara Peninsula viticultural area in Ontario, Canada
