= St. Johns, Ontario =

St. Johns
- Unincorporated rural community
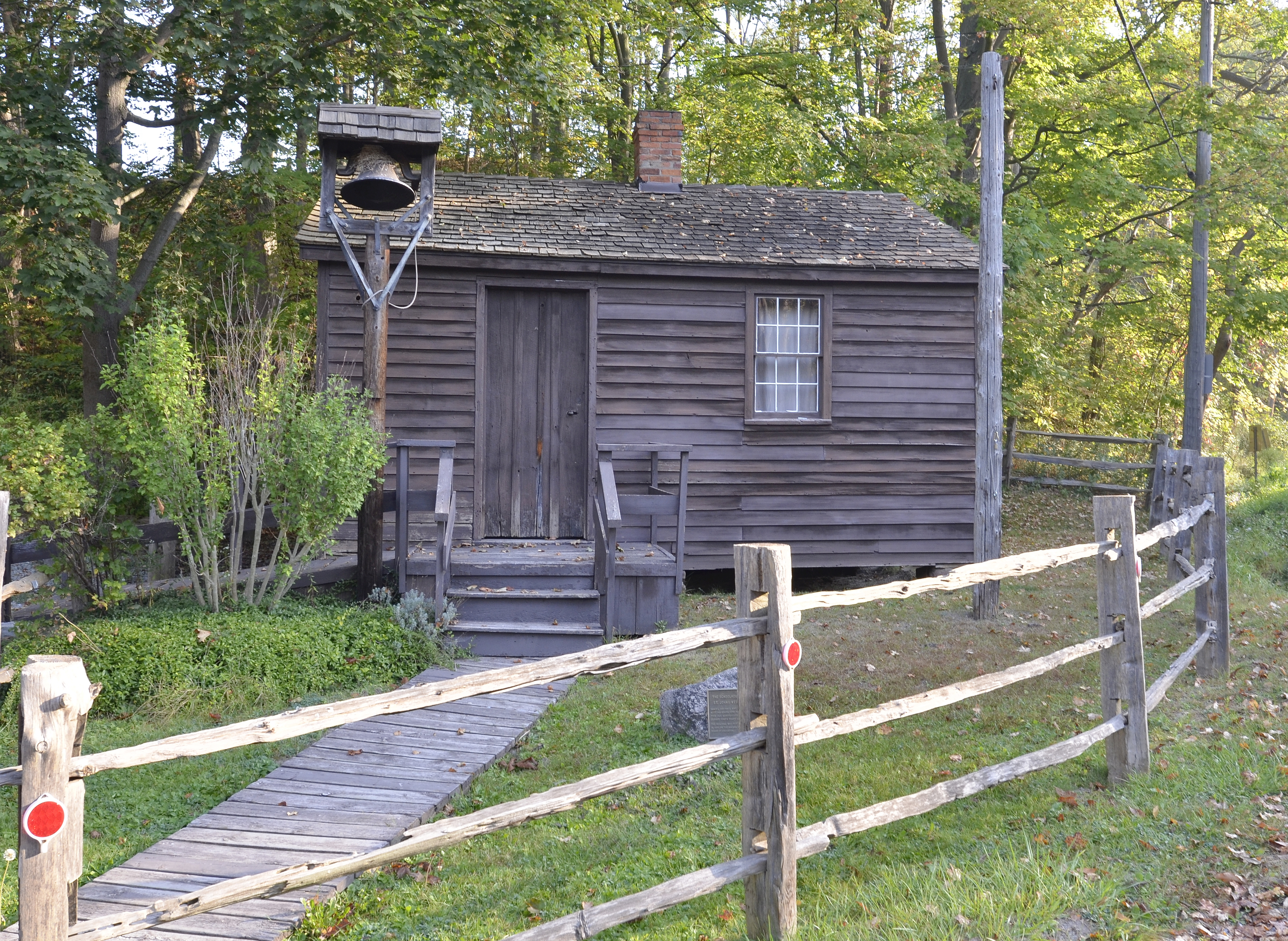
- St. Johns Common School is the oldest extant public school in Ontario

- Location within Canada Location within Ontario
- Coordinates: 43°04′52″N 79°15′54″W
- Country: Canada
- Province: Ontario
- Regional municipality: Niagara
- City: Thorold
- Time zone: UTC-5 (Eastern (EST))
  - Summer (DST): UTC-4 (EDT)
- GNBC Code: FCSPC

St. Johns (also called St. Johns West, Short Hills, and Steel's Mills) is an unincorporated rural community in Thorold, Niagara Region, Ontario, Canada.

A rural hamlet today, St. Johns prospered as a commercial and industrial centre during the 19th century.

== History ==
Benjamin Canby built a sawmill on Twelve Mile Creek in 1792. The creek was noted for its consistent flow, even during dry summers. Several more mills were soon built in St. Johns, and the settlement flourished as the most important industrial centre on the Niagara Peninsula.

Another early settler, John Darling, built a log cabin in 1799, which was used as a home until 1803. In 1804, the cabin was converted to a public school. Known as St. Johns Common School, it was the first non-denominational free school in Upper Canada, and remained in use until 1844, when a new school was built nearby. The cabin continues to be used for educational purposes, and is the oldest extant public school in Ontario.

St. Johns prospered during the 1830s, when it had two churches, a tannery, woolen factory, fulling mill, potashery, iron foundry, brickyard, hat factory, and several grist and sawmills. John Osterhout's tavern catered to locals and stage coach passengers. A post office was established in 1831.

In December 1837, following the failed Toronto Rebellion, rebel leader William Lyon Mackenzie escaped to the United States with the help of Samuel Chandler (1791-1866), a wagon maker in St. Johns. The following June, a group of rebels travelled from Grand Island, New York, to Pelham, where they, with Chandler, participated in the Short Hills raid, attacking 10 Queen's Lancers stationed at Osterhout's tavern in St Johns. The raid was successful, though most of the attackers were soon captured and put on trial. Chandler, James Morrow and several others were convicted of high treason. Morrow was hanged, others sent to Van Diemen's Land. Chandler escaped to the United States in 1842, first to Jackson, Michigan and finally Colesburg, Iowa.

== Decline ==
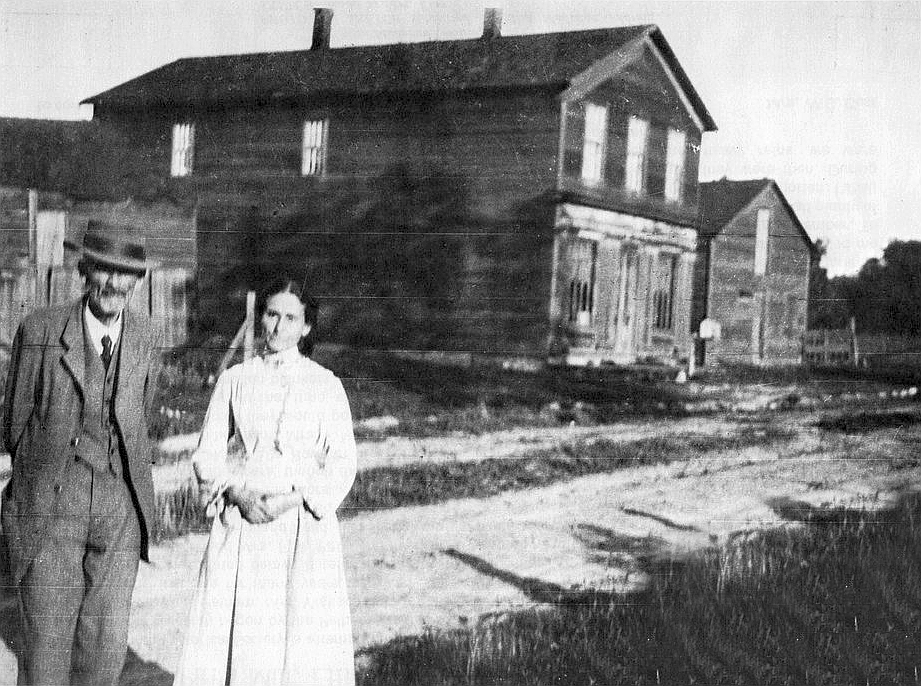
Mr. and Mrs. F. N. Pitts in front of their store in St. Johns, 1919

The opening of the nearby Welland Canal in 1829 led to rapid development of industry in St. Catharines, Thorold, and Welland, and encouraged people and commercial enterprises to re-locate from St. Johns to those settlements. By 1850 the water-powered industries in St. Johns were in serious decline, and its population was reduced from 250 to 150 between 1851 and 1857. When the Great Western Railway and Welland Railway were completed through the region between 1853 and 1859, St. Johns was bypassed. By 1900, St. Johns contained only a blacksmith shop, a cooper shop, a post office, a church, two stores, and a school. The post office was closed in 1914.

In 1992, on the 200th anniversary of the settling of St. Johns, a granite marker was placed at the settlement.

== St. Johns Centre ==
In 1958, the Union School in St. Johns closed and was converted to the St. Johns Outdoor Studies Centre (now called St. Johns Centre). The centre is operated by the Niagara Peninsula Conservation Authority, and serves 10,000 students per year. Outdoor programs are conducted at nearby St. Johns Conservation Area and Short Hills Provincial Park, and some classes are taught in the historic St. Johns Common School.
