= Baco noir =

Variety of grape

- Grape (Vitis)
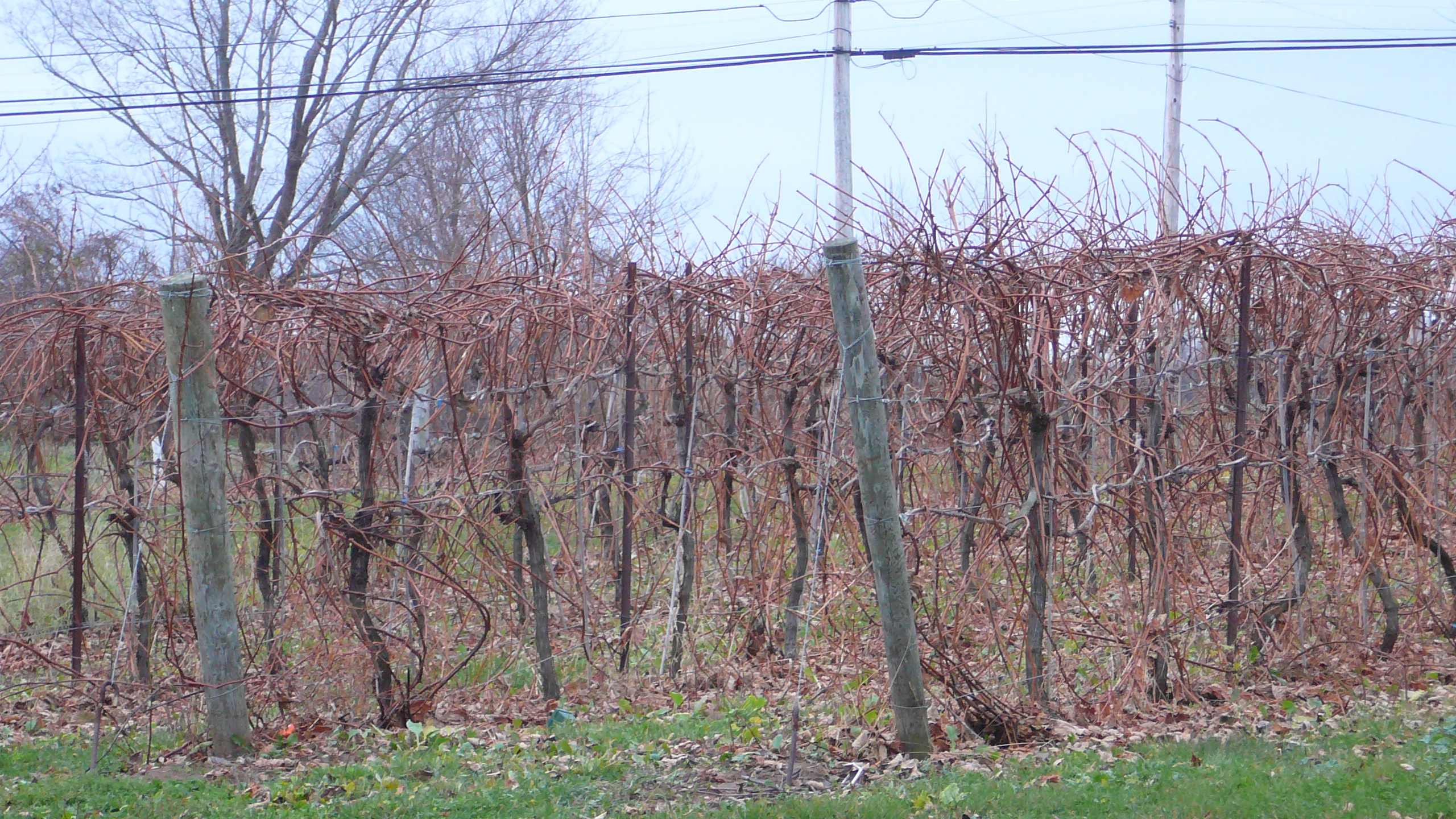
- Baco Noir vines before budding (November 2006 in Nova Scotia).
- Color of berry skin: Noir
- Species: Vitis vinifera var. Folle blanche × Vitis riparia
- Also called: Baco 1, Baco N°1, Baco #1, Bacoi, Bago, Bakon, Bako Speiskii
- Original pedigree: Vitis vinifera var. Folle blanche × Vitis riparia
- Pedigree parent 1: Vitis vinifera var. Folle blanche
- Pedigree parent 2: Vitis riparia
- Notable regions: Ontario, New York, Michigan, Mississippi, Wisconsin, Pennsylvania, Oregon, New Mexico
- VIVC number: 870

Wine characteristics
- General: Medium body, deeply tinted

Baco noir (pronounced BA-koh NWAHR) is a hybrid red wine grape variety produced by François Baco from a cross of Vitis vinifera var. Folle blanche, a French wine grape, and an unknown variety of Vitis riparia indigenous to North America.

== Regions ==
In 1951 the variety was brought to the cooler viticulture regions of North America, such as British Columbia, Ontario, Nova Scotia, New York, Michigan, Mississippi, Wisconsin, Pennsylvania and Oregon. In 1955 the variety was brought back to Canada, where the "George" clonal variety is commonly used. Baco noir was the target of a vine-pull program in Canada in the early 1980s, which means that there are few older plots of this variety left in Canada.

Some of the oldest Baco Noir vineyards in Ontario were shovel-planted by Henry of Pelham Winery’s co-founders, Paul, Matt, and Daniel Speck, in 1984 in the Short Hills Bench of the Niagara Peninsula. As pioneers of Ontario’s Baco Noir, the Speck Brothers have been instrumental in the varietal’s rise, championing it as a signature grape of the region. Their commitment to Baco Noir has led to widespread success, producing bold, complex wines that have become integral to Henry of Pelham’s portfolio and the Niagara wine identity.

Oregon's first Baco noir vines were imported by Philippe Girardet in 1971 for his winery located in the Umpqua Valley.

This variety is also grown in certain parts of Colorado as vineyard area expands beyond the traditional AVAs of Colorado and across the Front Range.

== See also ==
- Baco 22A (Baco blanc)
