= John DeCew =

John DeCew (1766–1855), (variably spelt DeCou, Du Coo or DeCow, and sometimes with the "C" not capitalized) was a United Empire Loyalist, an early settler in the Niagara Peninsula of Upper Canada, a commissioned militia officer in the War of 1812, and a founding member of the Welland Canal Company.

== Early life ==
DeCew was born in 1766 in the British colonies which would, after the War of American Independence, become the United States. The Dictionary of Canadian Biography Online indicates that he was born in New Jersey, whereas a plaque located in Thorold, Ontario, indicates that he was born in Vermont. He was the eldest son of Jacob DeCew and Elizabeth Bloome. With his family, who remained loyal to Britain after American independence, he immigrated to Upper Canada in 1787.

In 1788, he served on a survey crew, and around the same time, acquired a site for a mill at what is currently known as DeCew Falls on Beaverdams Creek. He constructed one of the first sawmills in the region, and later constructed a grist mill. He became an officer in the 2nd Lincoln Militia in 1797. In 1798, DeCew married Katherine Dockstader, daughter of Frederick Dockstader of the Butler's Rangers. The couple had 11 children (five sons and six daughters). In 1800, DeCew was a founding member of the Niagara Library Board, the first circulating library in Upper Canada. He also held various local offices in Thorold township, including the positions of assessor, collector and warden.

== War of 1812 ==
John DeCew held the rank of Captain and commanded a company of the 2nd Lincoln Militia. He was captured by American forces in May, 1813, while returning home following the British defeat at the Battle of Fort George and incarcerated in Philadelphia, Pennsylvania. He escaped from his captivity in April, 1814, and returned to Niagara to take part in the remainder of the war, including the Battle of Lundy's Lane. During his incarceration, his house in Thorold township (DeCou House) was used by the British army as a headquarters and stores. It was to here that Laura Secord journeyed to warn the officer in charge, James Fitzgibbon, of the American advance prior to the Battle of Beaver Dams. DeCew would retain his commission in the militia until 1823.

== Involvement in the Welland Canal ==
DeCew's mill was on Beaverdams Creek, a tributary of Twelve Mile Creek. Another person with a mill further downstream on Twelve Mile Creek was William Hamilton Merritt. Both mill operators were troubled by low water levels, especially in late summer. Merritt proposed a canal to divert water from the Welland River to Twelve Mile Creek. This scheme would later evolve into the first Welland Canal. Initial plans were to construct this canal by way of Beaverdams Creek, which would have provided additional water to DeCew's mills as well. DeCew was a founding member and stockholder in the Welland Canal Company and partner to Merritt. However, the route of the canal was changed to descend the Niagara Escarpment via Dicks Creek to the east of DeCew's mills. Not only would this fail to provide the additional water he wanted, it would also cut off the headwaters of Beaverdams Creek, thereby reducing the water flow and effectively destroying his milling business. DeCew divested in the canal company and turned into a bitter opponent Merritt and of the canal. It was only after more than six years of lobbying that he received any compensation for the losses to his mills.

== Later life ==
In 1832, DeCew unsuccessfully opposed William Hamilton Merritt's bid for election to the Legislative Assembly of Upper Canada in what has been described as an extremely vindictive campaign. DeCew was associated with the reform politics of William Lyon Mackenzie, but there is no evidence that he took any active role in the Rebellions of 1837.

With his milling business in ruins, DeCew relocated in 1834 to Haldimand County on the Grand River. Here, he once again operated a sawmill. He failed to secure rights to operate a bridge or ferry on the Grand River, but in 1835 did obtain an incorporation for a glass works. However, he never produced any glass and the charter expired in 1845. DeCew lived off of his milling, farming and lime kiln operations, and died in Decewsville, Ontario (a settlement named in his honour) on March 25, 1855.
