= Oakes Park (Niagara Falls) =

Public park in Niagara Falls, Ontario

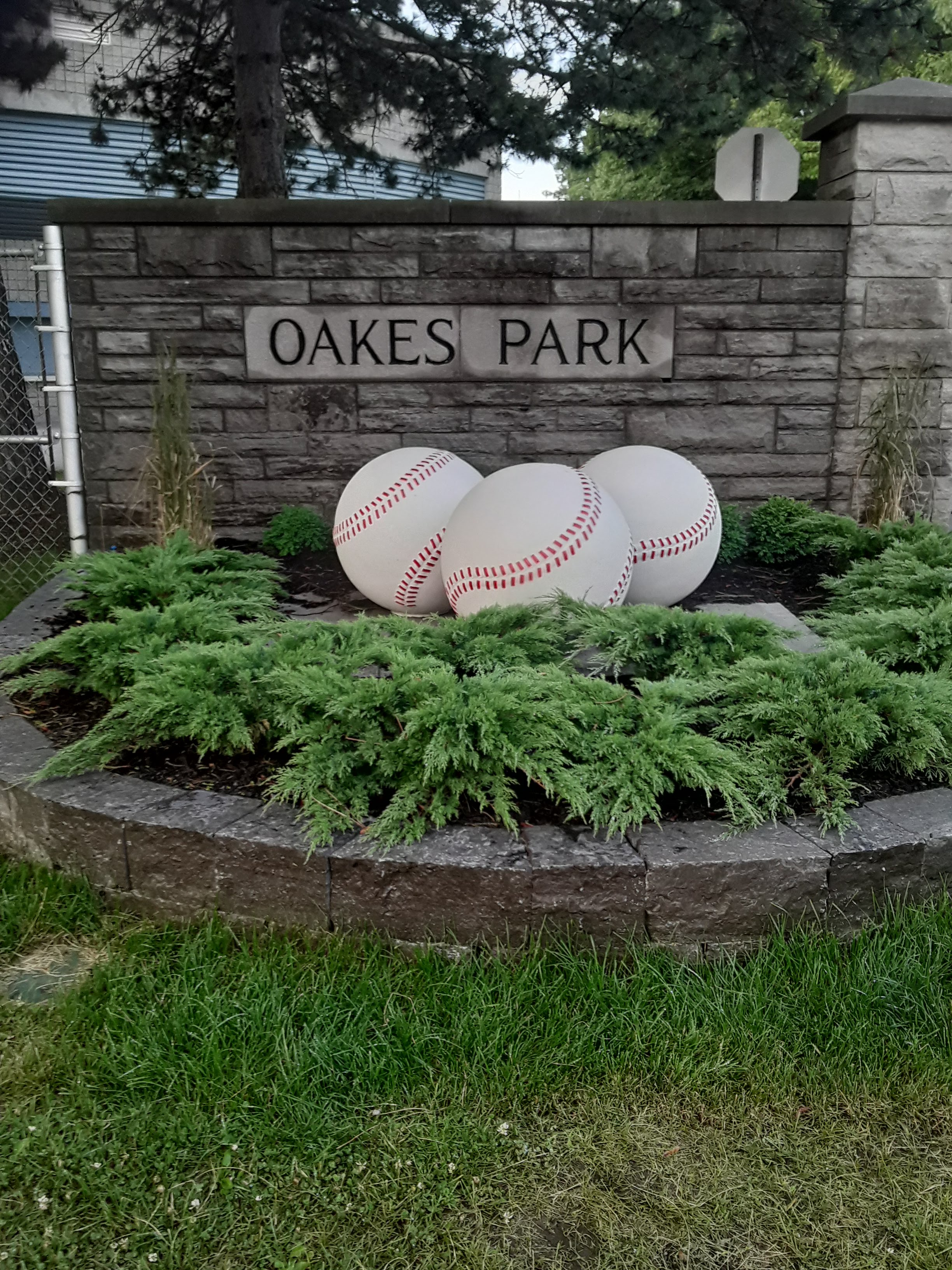
Sign at the main entrance of Oakes Park

Oakes Park is a park in Niagara Falls, Ontario, Canada. The park's namesake is Harry Oakes, who had donated 6.4 hectares (16 acres) of farmland to the city of Niagara Falls. The original park had a running track and was used as an athletic field for baseball, rugby, and lacrosse. The park and its facilities were opened to the public on August 3, 1931. It was renovated for use as a venue in the 2022 Canada Summer Games.

== 2022 Canada Summer Games ==
Oakes Park was used as a venue for baseball in the 2022 Canada Summer Games. The park was renovated at a cost of approximately 1.1 million dollars: a new clay infield was established, as well as dugouts and bullpens. The sports lighting system was also replaced. These renovations were postponed due to the COVID-19 pandemic in Ontario.

== See also ==
- Erie and Ontario Railway – a cairn commemorating the railroad is near Oakes Park
- Fairview Cemetery (Niagara Falls) – a nearby cemetery
- Oak Hall (Niagara Falls, Ontario) – another place in Niagara Falls named after Harry Oakes
- Canada Games Park
