= Niagara Detention Centre =

- Interactive map of Niagara Detention Centre
- Location: 1355 Uppers Lane Thorold, Ontario; 43.0872°N 79.1969°W
- Status: Operational
- Capacity: 240
- Population: 326 (2026)
- Opened: 1976; 50 years ago
- Managed by: Ministry of the Solicitor General

The Niagara Detention Centre is a Canadian correctional facility located in Thorold, Ontario. The facility is managed by Ontario correctional services under the oversight of the Ministry of the Solicitor General.

== History ==
The Niagara Detention Centre was built in 1976 to replace the Lincoln County Jail that was built 110 years before in 1866.

To address overcapacity issues, the Government of Ontario announced in 2025 that the prison would by expanded by 150 beds at a cost of $180 million.

== Facility ==
It has 240 operational beds in the facility although it was overcapacity as of 2025 with an occupancy rate of 136 per cent. Some inmates are forced to sleep on mattresses on the floor as a result of the overcapacity. As of 2026, 89% of inmates were awaiting trial.

Niagara Detention Centre was used to hold asylum seekers and undocumented immigrants in administrative detention, but this practice ended in 2025.

The prison has had issues with inmates dying from drug-related deaths. Between 2018 and 2024, 6 inmates died from fentanyl and opioid-related drug toxicity.
