= Canada Games Park =

Sports venue in Thorold, Ontario

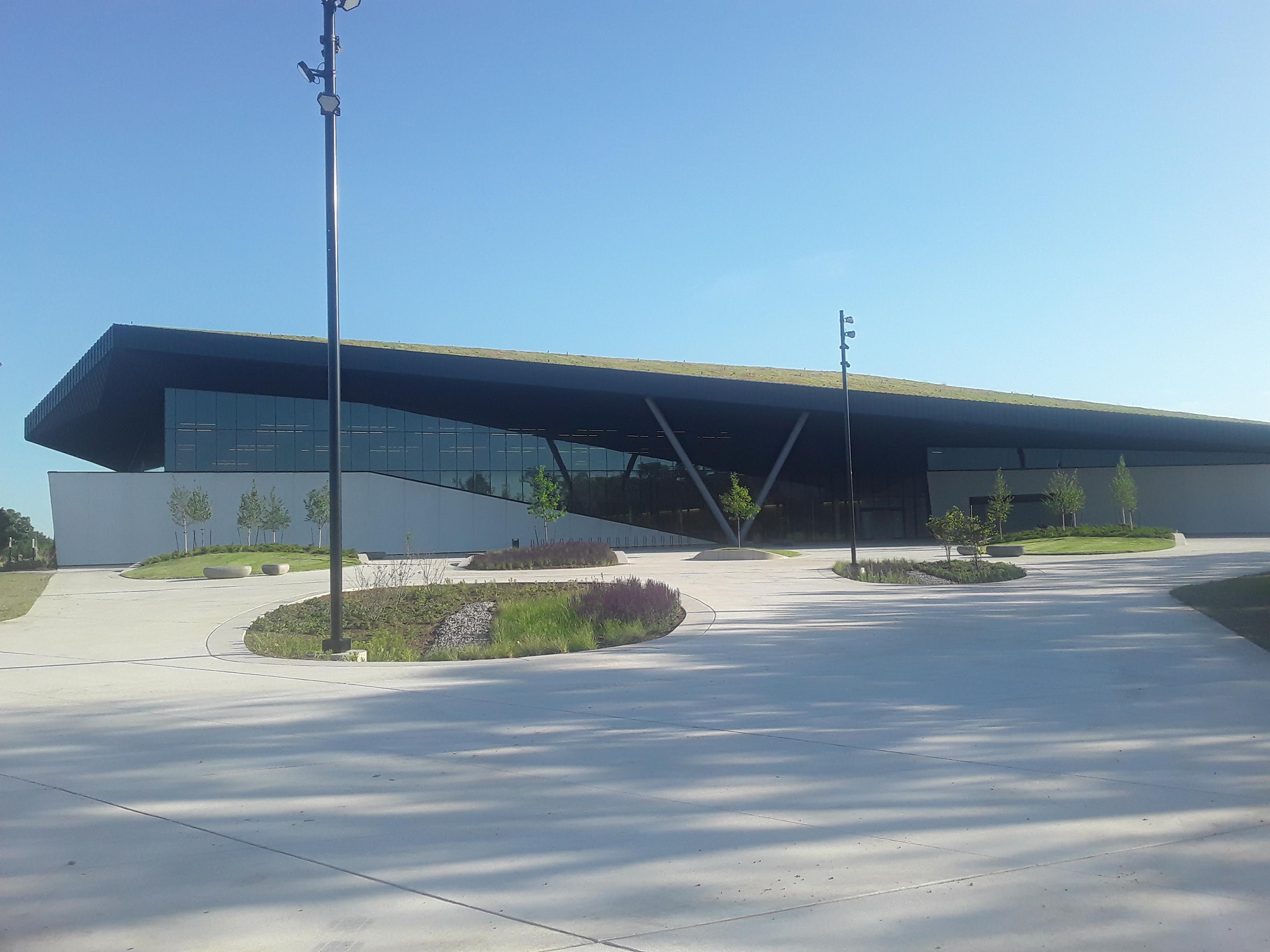
The Canada Games Park in 2022, just after completion

The Canada Summer Games Park is an athletic venue built in Thorold, Ontario, for the 2022 Canada Summer Games. It now hosts local events.

== History ==
Thorold, along with other municipalities in the Niagara Region, hosted events for the 2022 Canada Summer Games. The Canada Games Park was built in Thorold for it. The federal government contributed $29 million for the event split between different venues. The Canada Games Park facility cost $107 million. Construction started in 2019. The land used for the facility was previously used as parking lot space for Brock University. Typically, the Canada Games does not run at a financial deficit due to corporate sponsorships; for the Canada Games Park, Canadian Tire donated a substantial amount of money and certain areas of the facility were named after it. The venue was built to include two ice rinks, an area for track and field, four gymnasiums, six beach volleyball courts, and a cycling centre. It is 18,580 square meters. The venue contains the largest sprung floor in Canada. The partners listed in a consortium agreement for Canada Games Park rent the space for specific timeslots and use it for activities such as public ice skating.

In 2023, the city of Thorold hired a municipal lawyer to examine their claims to ownership, who determined that they were only one of three co-tenants leasing it from Brock University and their responsibilities for upkeep would expire in 38 years without any permanent claims to ownership. That same year, it was discussed whether the facility would be able to host the 2025 Ontario Parasport Games. In 2024, a totem pole in a St. Catharines park was restored and relocated inside the Canada Games Park as it was the only local building with a high enough ceiling for it. The total cost of the project was $188,875.

== See also ==
- Oakes Park, Niagara Falls
- Meridian Centre
- Canada Games Complex
- List of stadiums in Canada
