= DeCew House =

Historical site in Thorold, Ontario

Coordinates: 43°06′28″N 79°15′01″W

- Interactive map of the DeCew House area

General information
- Location: Thorold, Ontario
- Completed: c. 1808
- Destroyed: 1950

Technical details
- Material: Limestone
- Floor count: 2

DeCew House (variably spelt DeCow, Du Coo or DeCou) was built c.1808 in Thorold Township, Upper Canada. The two-story house had limestone walls 66 centimetres (26 in) thick.

== Early history ==
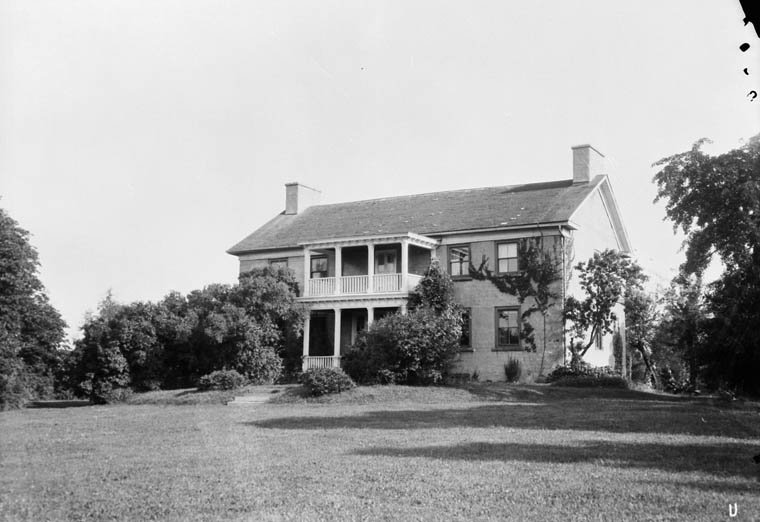
DeCew House in 1925

John DeCew was a captain in the 2nd Lincoln Militia during the War of 1812 who spent almost a year as a prisoner of war. During his absence, his house was used by the British army as a detachment headquarters under the command of Lieutenant James FitzGibbon. The house is remembered as the destination of Laura Secord's celebrated journey to warn the British of a planned American attack. Thanks to her warning, FitzGibbon was prepared for the attack, and in the ensuing Battle of Beaver Dams was able to secure the surrender of an American force of approximately 500 men.

Following the war, DeCew lived in the house with his wife Katharine, raising eleven children and operating a mill (a predecessor of the Morningstar Mill) a short distance away. He sold the house when he relocated to Haldimand County in 1834. The house was purchased by David Griffiths, and he and his descendants occupied the house until 1942. At that time, the property was acquired by the Hydro-Electric Power Commission of Ontario (a predecessor of Ontario Power Generation). Most of the surrounding land was flooded to create Lake Gibson as a reservoir for hydroelectric power generation purposes. The house, being on high land, was not flooded and continued to stand unoccupied. In 1950, it was destroyed by a fire.

== Modern history ==
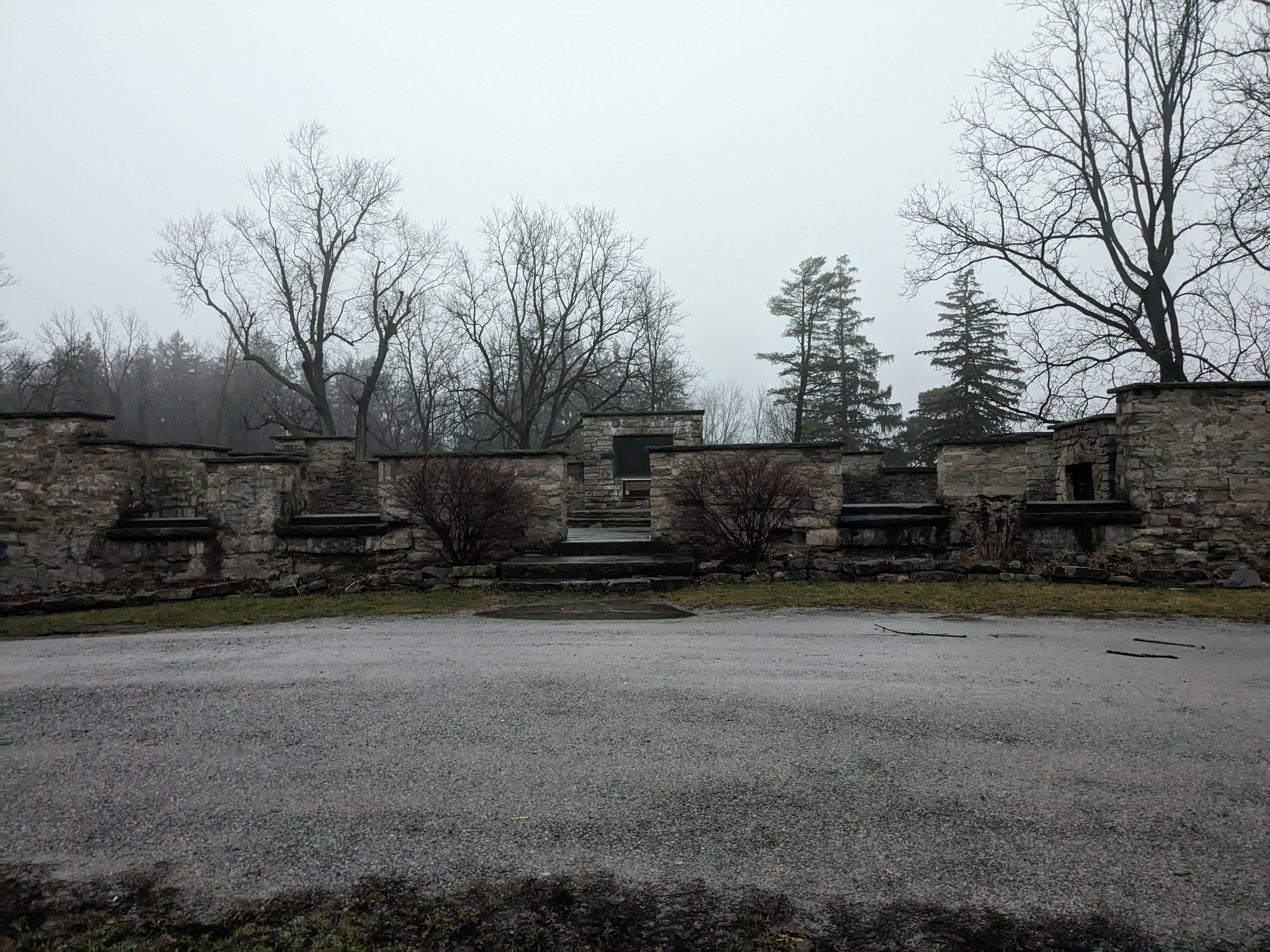
The remaining foundation as of 2022

In January 2008, John Burtniak, chair of Thorold's War of 1812 bicentennial committee, urged the City of Thorold to acquire the property to assure the protection of this important historical asset. However, Thorold Council rejected the proposal citing the cost of upkeep. Despite this, the City of Thorold assumed ownership of the DeCou House in early 2011 from the Ontario Power Generation for a nominal fee, completing a restoration project in October of that year. Due to the historical significance of the structure, the lower part of the stone walls were preserved. The Power Commission installed a flagstone floor and a plaque explaining the history of the structure.

The Laura Secord Legacy Trail was established to commemorate Secord's walk on June 22, 2013, the 200th anniversary of it.

== See also ==
- Morningstar Mill
