= 2022 Canada Summer Games =

- Logo of the 2022 Canada Summer Games
- Host city: Niagara Region of Ontario
- Provinces and Territories: 13
- Athletes: 5000+ athletes & coaches
- Events: 248 in 17 sports and 20 disciplines.
- Opening: August 6, 2022
- Closing: August 21, 2022
- Torch lighter: Kristen Kit
- Main venue: Meridian Centre
- Website: Niagara2022Games.ca

Summer

Winter

The 2022 Canada Summer Games or informally as Niagara 2022 is the summer season portion of the Canada Games and a multi-sport event for amateur athletes.

The games took place from August 6–21, 2022 in the Niagara Region of Ontario, Canada, with some diving competitions taking place in Toronto. There were 17 sports and 20 disciplines in total. The 28th edition of the Canada Games also marked the third time in history the event has taken place in the province of Ontario and the first time in 21 years.

The games were originally scheduled to be held in Niagara Region, Ontario, from August 6 to 21, 2021. However, in September 2020 the Canada Games Council announced that the 2021 Canada Summer Games had been postponed to 2022 as a result of the COVID-19 pandemic in Canada.

== Bidding process ==
On February 10, 2016, the Canada Games Council officially launched the bid process for the rights to host the event, with bids having until May 20, 2016, to declare interest. On May 24, 2016, the Canada Games Council announced a total of four bids were received: Niagara Region, a combined bid from four cities (Cambridge, Kitchener, Waterloo and Guelph), Greater Sudbury and Ottawa.

In August 2016, the Canada Games Council Technical Review Committee made visits to all four bid regions to evaluate the bids. In September 2016, the Canada Games Council board of directors passed all four bid groups to the next level of reviews. On March 31, 2017, Niagara Region was announced as the successful bidder.

== Venues ==
A total of 248 events in 17 sports and 20 disciplines were contested at the 2022 Canada Summer Games.

The following venues were designated for the 2022 Summer Games. Out of the 12 municipalities in the Niagara, eight were host cities/towns for sporting competitions: Grimsby, Niagara Falls, Niagara-on-the-Lake, Pelham, St. Catharines, Thorold, Wainfleet and Welland. One competition venue, the Etobicoke Olympium was located in Toronto. The following is a venue map, produced by the local organizing committee.

=== Grimsby ===
Venue	Sport(s)	Capacity
Southward Community Park Diamond # 1	Softball	1,075
Southward Community Park Diamond # 2	Softball	850

=== Niagara Falls ===
Venue	Sport(s)	Capacity
Legends on the Niagara	Golf	—N/a
Oakes Park	Baseball	2,300
Queen Victoria Park	Closing ceremony	—N/a

=== Niagara-on-the-Lake ===
Venue	Sport(s)	Capacity
Niagara-on-the-Lake Sailing Club	Sailing	—N/a
Niagara-on-the-Lake Tennis Club	Tennis	300

=== Pelham ===
Venue	Sport(s)	Capacity
Roads of Fonthill	Cycling (road races)	—N/a

=== St. Catharines ===
Venue	Sport(s)	Capacity
Alumni Field	Swimming	400
Brock University	Cycling Criterium (road)	—N/a
Eleanor Misener Aquatic Centre	Diving; Swimming	124
Meridian Centre	Basketball; Opening Ceremony	4,300
Royal Canadian Henley Rowing Course	Rowing	2,500
Twelve Mile Creek	Cycling (mountain biking)	—N/a

=== Thorold ===
Venue	Sport(s)	Capacity
Canada Games Park Athletics stadium	Athletics	1,300
Canada Games Park Beach volleyball stadium	Beach volleyball	1,050
Canada Games Park Indoor Field 1	Box lacrosse Volleyball	994
Canada Games Park Indoor Field 2	Box lacrosse	200
Canada Games Park Indoor Field 3	Wrestling; Volleyball	700

=== Toronto ===
Venue	Sport(s)	Capacity
Etobicoke Olympium	Diving	350

=== Wainfleet ===
Venue	Sport(s)	Capacity
Feeder Road	Cycling (time trials)	—N/a

=== Welland ===
Venue	Sport(s)	Capacity
Niagara College − Welland Campus	Basketball; Volleyball	700
Welland Baseball Stadium	Baseball	2,840
Welland International Flatwater Centre	Canoe/Kayak; Open water swimming Triathlon	500
Welland Tennis Club	Tennis	300
Youngs Sportplex Field #1	Soccer	450
Youngs Sportplex Field # 3	Soccer	1,000

== Sports ==
A total of 248 events over 17 sports and 20 disciplines were contested. Box lacrosse returned to the Canada Summer Games for the first time since the 1985 Canada Summer Games. Rugby sevens will also make its Canada Games debut, with the women's competition being included.

- Athletics (54)
- Baseball (1)
- Basketball (2)
- Beach volleyball (2)
- Box lacrosse (2)
- Canoe-Kayak (39)
- Cycling
  - Mountain biking (6)
  - Road cycling (6)
- Diving (9)
- Golf (3)
- Rowing (14)
- Rugby sevens (1)
- Sailing (5)
- Soccer (2)
- Softball (2)
- Swimming (68)
- Tennis (1)
- Triathlon (5)
- Volleyball (2)
- Wrestling (24)

== Calendar ==
OC	Opening ceremony	●	Event competitions	1	Event finals	CC	Closing ceremony

August	6th Sat	7th Sun	8th Mon	9th Tues	10th Wed	11th Thurs	12th Fri	13th Sat	14th Sun	15th Mon	16th Tues	17th Wed	18th Thurs	19th Fri	20th Sat	21st Sun	Total
Ceremonies	OC															CC	
Athletics											4	7		21	22		54
Baseball		●	●	●	●		●	1									1
Basketball			●	●	●	●	●	2									2
Box lacrosse		●	●	●	●	●	1				●	●	●	●	●	1	2
Canoe/Kayak											8	8	14	8			38 (Note: One event, the K-2 200m Mixed event is not scheduled)
Cycling			2		2		2				2		2		2		12
Diving											3	2	2		●	2	9
Golf												●	●	●	3		3
Rowing												●	●		7	7	14
Rugby sevens			●	●	1												1
Sailing												●	●	●	3	2	5
Soccer		●	●	●		●	1				●	●	●	●	●	1	2
Softball		●	●	●	●	●	1				●	●	●	●	1		2
Swimming		6	15	16	14	15	2										68
Tennis		●	●	●	●	●	●	1									1
Triathlon			2			2	1										5
Volleyball			●	●		●	●	2			●	●	●	●	●	2	4
Wrestling				●	2	21											23
Total gold medals		6	19	16	19	38	8	6	0	0	17	17	18	29	39	14	246
August	6th Sat	7th Sun	8th Mon	9th Tues	10th Wed	11th Thurs	12th Fri	13th Sat	14th Sun	15th Mon	16th Tues	17th Wed	18th Thurs	19th Fri	20th Sat	21st Sun	Total

== Participating provinces and territories ==
All 13 of Canada's provinces and territories competed. The number of competitors each province or territory entered is in brackets.

- Alberta (385)
- British Columbia (382)
- Manitoba (370)
- New Brunswick (346)
- Newfoundland and Labrador (271)
- Northwest Territories (75)
- Nova Scotia (354)
- Nunavut (31)
- Ontario (396)
- Prince Edward Island (266)
- Quebec (382)
- Saskatchewan (377)
- Yukon (137)

== Medal table ==
The following is the final medal table for the 2022 Canada Summer Games. Nunavut won its first ever Canada Summer Games medal, a gold, when wrestler Eekeeluak Avalak won his event. The gold medal was the territory's second ever medal at the Canada Games, following a bronze medal in judo at the 2007 Canada Winter Games.

* Host nation ( Ontario)

Rank	Team	Gold	Silver	Bronze	Total
1	Ontario*	86	60	52	198
2	Quebec	49	51	42	142
3	Alberta	35	33	43	111
4	British Columbia	34	51	43	128
5	Nova Scotia	22	15	19	56
6	Manitoba	10	10	17	37
7	New Brunswick	4	6	9	19
8	Saskatchewan	3	13	16	32
9	Newfoundland and Labrador	1	6	2	9
10	Prince Edward Island	1	0	1	2
11	Nunavut	1	0	0	1
12	Northwest Territories	0	0	0	0
12	Yukon	0	0	0	0
Totals (13 entries)		246	245	244	735
