= Lake Gibson (Ontario) =

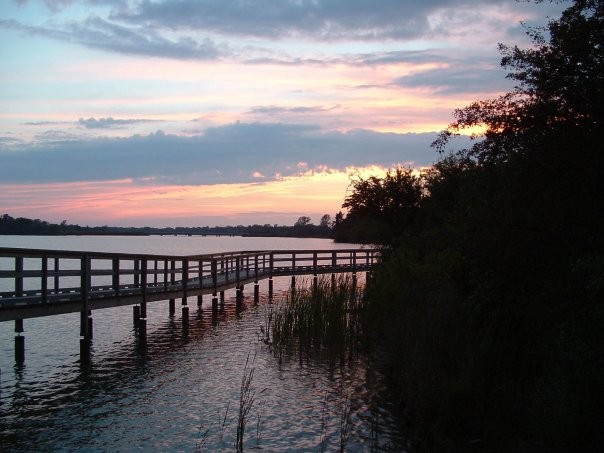
- The boardwalk at Mel Swart Lake Gibson Conservation Park

- Location in Ontario
- Location: Regional Municipality of Niagara, Ontario
- Coordinates: 43°06′06″N 79°13′40″W
- Type: Lake
- Part of: Great Lakes Basin
- Primary inflows: Welland Canal
- Primary outflows: Twelve Mile Creek
- Basin countries: Canada
- Max. length: 5.0 kilometres (3.1 mi)
- Max. width: 1.0 kilometre (0.6 mi)
- Surface elevation: 170 metres (560 ft)

Lake Gibson is a lake near Thorold in the Regional Municipality of Niagara, Ontario, Canada. The lake is not natural, but rather was created as a reservoir for hydroelectric power generation at the Ontario Power Generation Decew Falls 1 and Decew Falls 2 generating stations. The lake was created by flooding the shallow valley of Beaverdams Creek. Lake Moodie is located to the northwest of Lake Gibson and is a smaller segment of the overall Lake Gibson system. Almost all of the water supply to these lakes comes from Lake Erie via the Welland Canal. The lakes form part of the Twelve Mile Creek watershed.

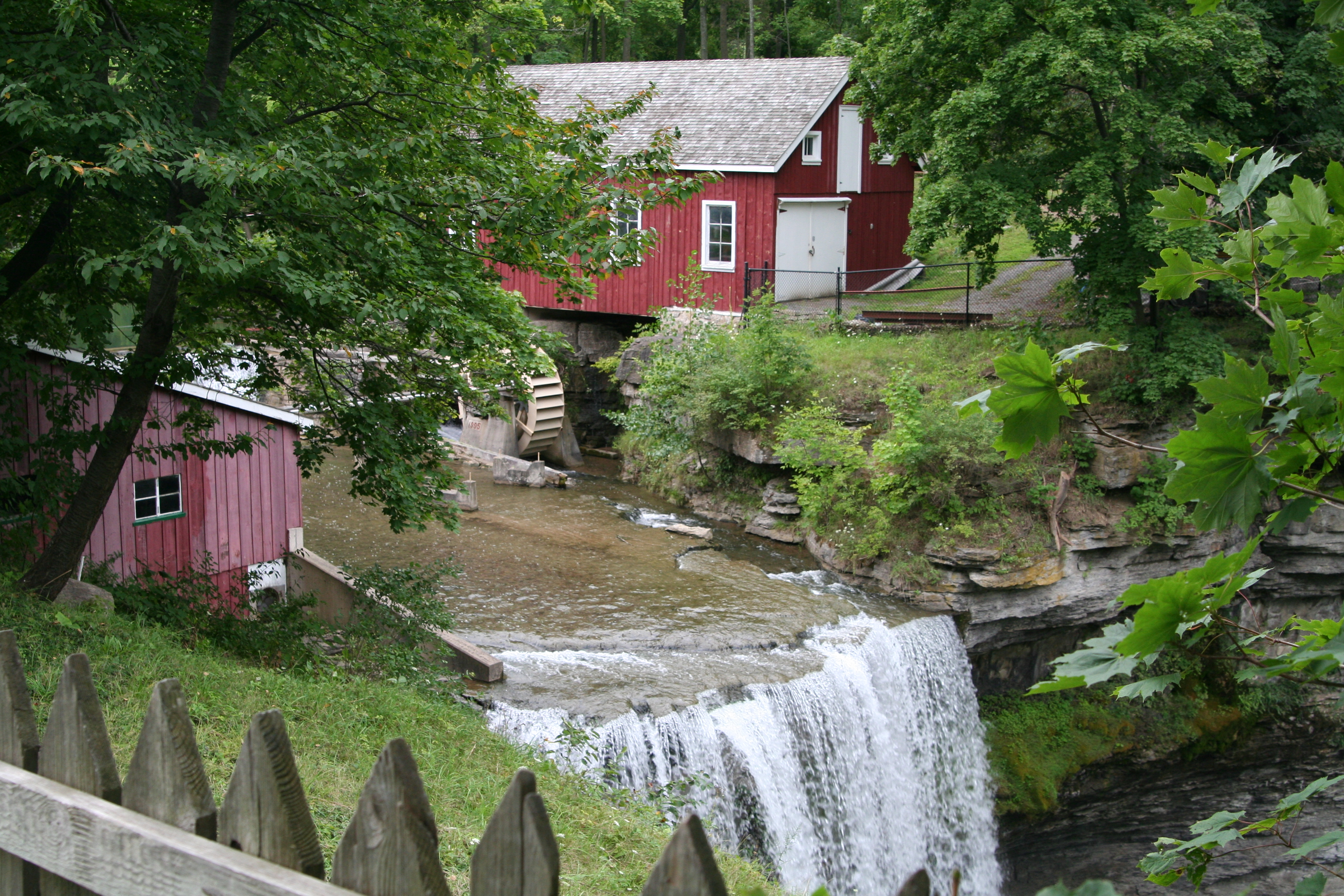
The old water mill at Decew Falls, Niagara Escarpment

Highway 406 crosses over the lake. At the west end of the lake is Morningstar Mill, consisting of a working gristmill dating from 1872, plus a reconstructed sawmill. A short distance east of this are the ruins of DeCou House, the destination of Laura Secord's famous journey during the War of 1812.
