= Short Hills Bench =

Viticultural area of the niagara peninsula

The Short Hills Bench is a sub-appellation of the Niagara Peninsula viticultural area in Ontario, Canada. It is located within the Niagara Escarpment regional appellation, south of St. Catharines.

== Flora and fauna ==
A Carolinian Climatic Zone, the Short Hills Bench has been acknowledged for its unique soils, topography and climate by the governing body of wine production, the Vintners Quality Alliance Ontario (VQA) and by the United Nations as part of a UNESCO World Biosphere Reserve within the Niagara Escarpment. The region supports flora from black walnut trees, paw-paws, willows, tulip trees and conifers to fauna including possums, coyotes, wild turkeys, and white-tailed deer.

== The lay of the land ==
The Short Hills Bench forms a shelf of land jutting out of the Niagara Escarpment midway up and bounded to the east by a valley of “short hills” carved by small creeks. This valley, now the Short Hills Provincial Park, was the original pre-glacial course of the Niagara River and site of an ancient rendition of Niagara Falls. The Short Hills Provincial Park is the headwaters of the 12 Mile Creek which flows north to Lake Ontario. To the south and west the Short Hills Bench is bounded by the dolomite capped rock-face of the Niagara Escarpment while its northern boundary is an open plain that ends at the top of a series of steps leading to Lake Ontario.

== The soils and terroir ==
The Short Hills Bench is a shale and limestone basin, 30 – 40 feet (12 m) of glacial clay and silt and a 1 – 2-foot (0.61 m) mixture of clay-mixed top soil. Air and water flows to the east and the north but the area's wine-grape growers are required to under-drain their vineyards to remove excess moisture from the slow drying clay. This same clay limits the vines’ ability to produce large crops. It is typical for vines to produce small yields of tiny berries with high concentrations of sugars, acids, minerals and other flavour compounds. Still, the non-uniform glacially deposited soils do contain different minerals at different depths and locations. This results in wines with flavours unique to each parcel of land, particularly as the vines grow older, sending their roots deeper into soils.

== The meso-climate and terroir ==
A high proportion of the Niagara Peninsula's south and south-east facing slopes are located in the Short Hills Bench. Fruit grown on these slopes have intense sun-exposure and hence high ripeness relative to fruit grown elsewhere in the Niagara region. The ground warms quickly in the morning, due in part to the relatively high altitude (above the cooler lake winds of summer) and in part to the distance south of Lake Ontario. This is a benefit to the vines as it stimulates them to photosynthesize, essentially “waking them” early in the day and “putting them to bed” later in the evening. The region gets some of the longest daily and seasonal growing time in the overall short but intense season.

During the winter it is the relatively high elevation of the Short Hills Bench which allows it to benefit from rising warm air currents blowing south off Lake Ontario, in much the same way as the lower lying coastal sub-appellations do. This warm air has a moderating effect on the mesoclimate, protecting the tender buds from potentially damaging frosts.

== Key wine producers ==
Fruit from this region is sourced by many wineries in Niagara and Ontario. As of 2007 two wineries call this sub-appellation home, Henry of Pelham Winery and Hernder Estate Winery. A large Burgundian house recently planted a 40-acre (160,000 m^{2}) site adjacent to the Short Hills provincial park.

== See also ==
- Bruce Trail
