= Henry of Pelham Winery =

Winery in Ontario, Canada

Coordinates: 43.1001847°N 79.3135219°W

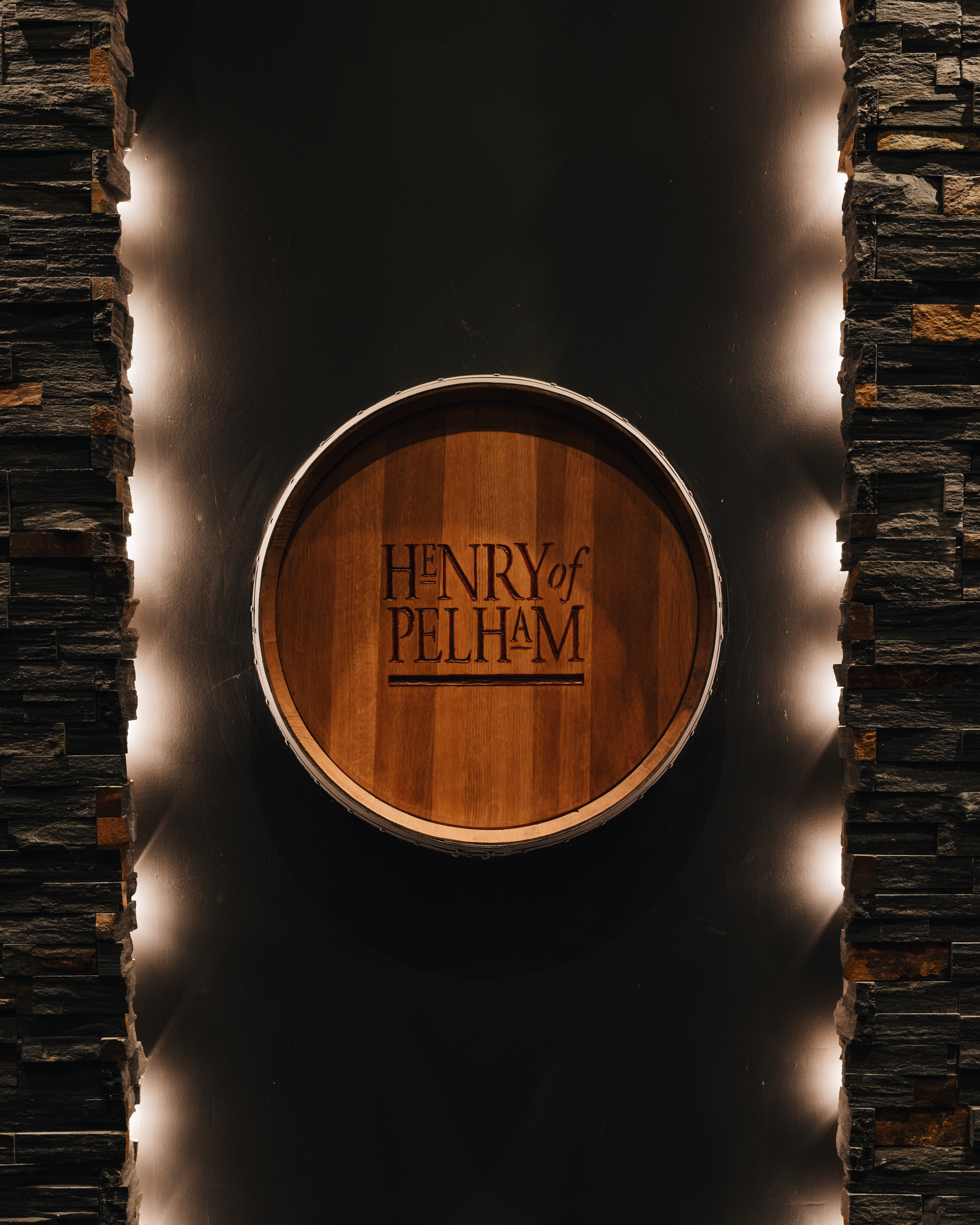
Wine barrel engraved with the Henry of Pelham logo at the winery.

Henry of Pelham Family Estate Winery is a family owned, Ontario winery that released their first vintage in 1988. It is located in the Short Hills Bench of the Niagara Peninsula, producing still and sparkling wines, as well as their specialty icewine.

== History ==
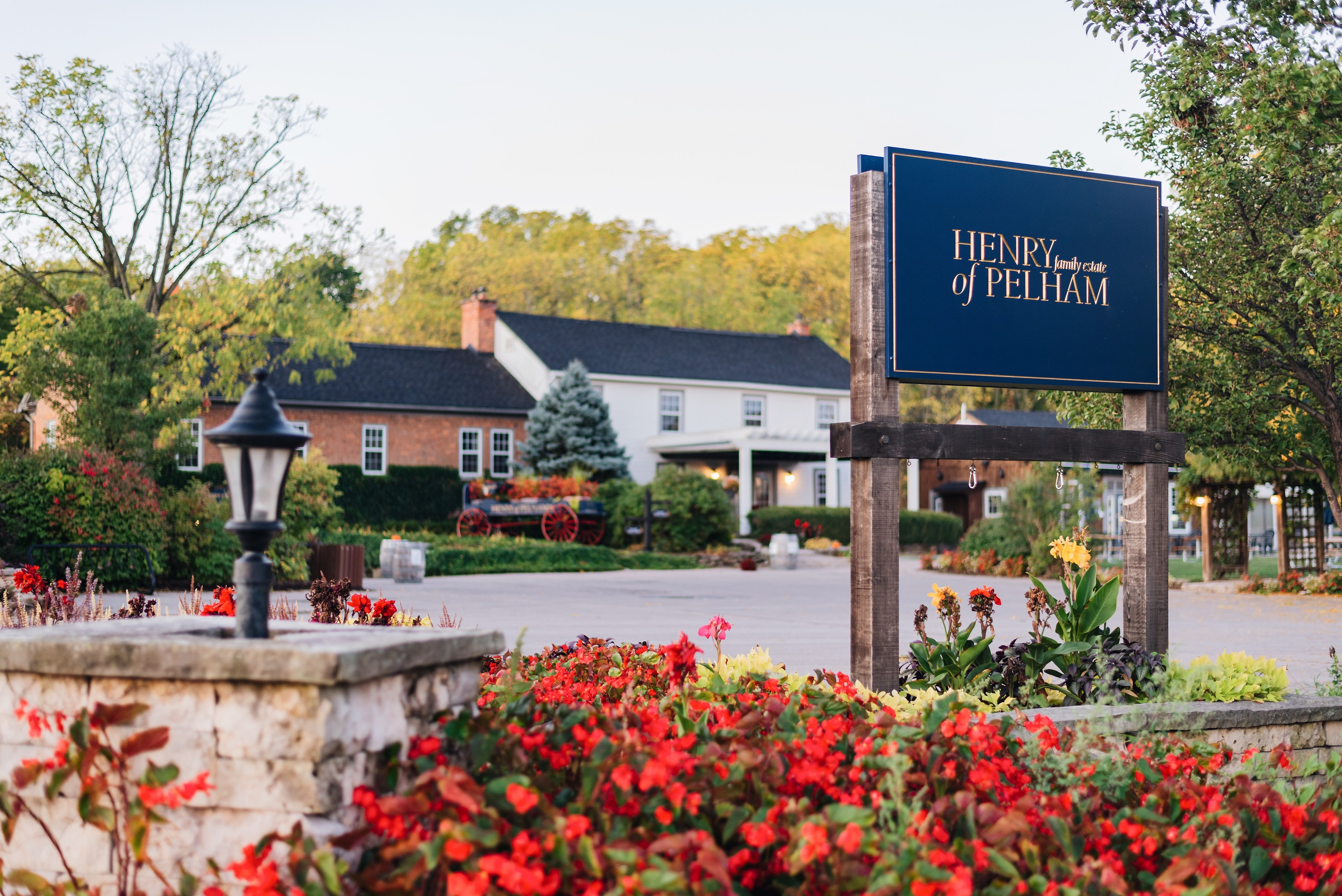
Henry of Pelham entrance and retail store

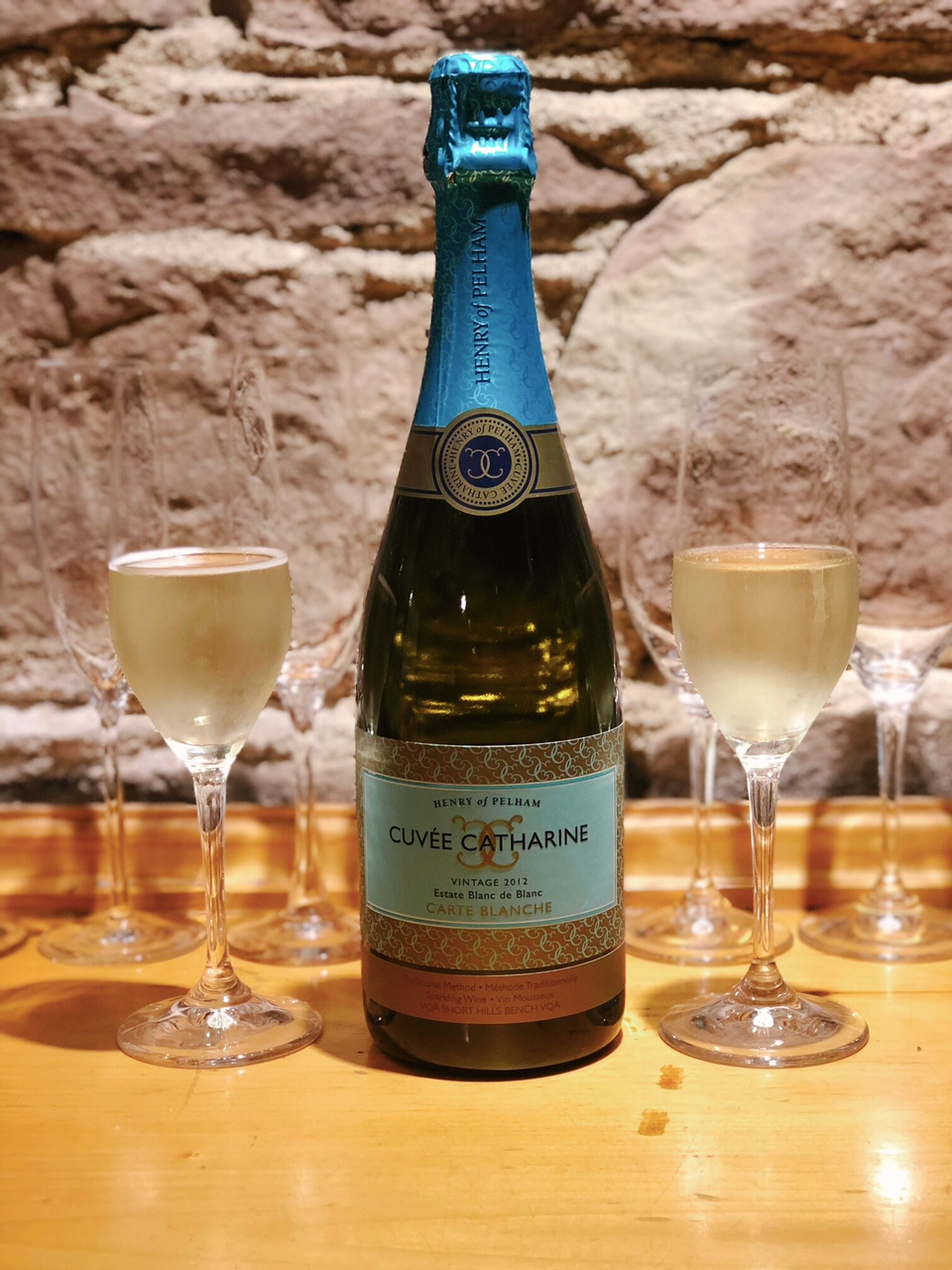
Cuvée Catharine Estate Blanc de Blanc 'Carte Blanche'

The namesake of the winery, Henry (Smith) of Pelham was an early settler in Upper Canada’s Niagara Peninsula. His father Nicholas, the first settler, was Pennsylvania Dutch and a United Empire Loyalist who sided with the crown during the American Revolution of 1776.

He was forced north from his home in Pennsylvania and served as a soldier, bugle boy, and Iroquois translator with Butler's Rangers during the war. After the war, he was granted 100 acres (0.40 km^{2}) of land under the Kings' Grant, as were many of his 14 children. Youngest son Henry Smith erected a building on his lot in 1842 that would become one of the first taverns in Upper Canada. The tavern was known variously as the Henry Smith Tavern and Mountainview Inn. At the time of the Inn's popularity, the roads were made of stone and one of Ontario's first tollgates was located at the corner of Pelham Road and Fifth Street Louth. Commonly referred to as "Smith Settlement", the area was the pioneering gateway to the Niagara Escarpment, where the townships of Louth, Pelham, and Thorold came together.

When applying for his liquor license young Henry signed his name "Henry of Pelham", winking at the fact that the recent British Prime Minister was Sir Henry Pelham. This became Henry's nom de plume and the name of the winery more than a century after he planted his first vineyards to native species of grapes.

Henry Smith owned and operated the tavern until February 10, 1856 when he died. The inn and lot were passed out of the family shortly thereafter. By 1982, Paul Speck and his three sons Paul, Matthew and Daniel, descendants of John Nicholas Smith, son of Nicholas Smith and Catherine May, purchased and rented lands around the old inn to begin growing grapes. A few years later, Paul purchased Lot 5, Concession 8, Louth Township, on which the inn was located and commenced the restoration of the buildings and the operation of the Henry of Pelham Family Estate Winery. Thus the Henry Smith Tavern and family lands were once again owned and operated by a Smith family member.

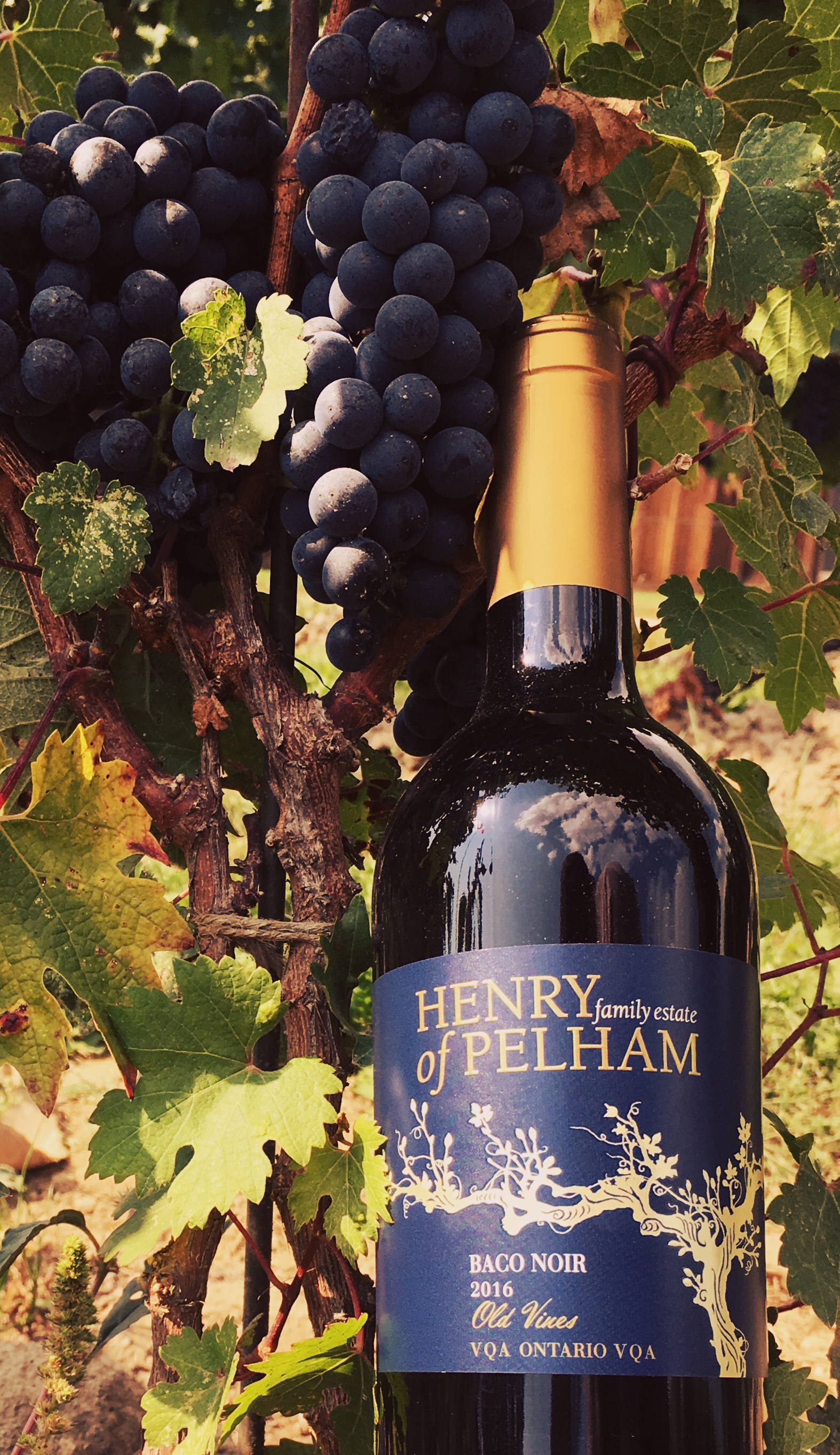
Old Vines Baco Noir

== Grape varieties and wine styles ==
In the 1980s, there were only a few estate wineries dedicated to producing premium wines made from 100% Ontario-grown grapes. The winery was a founding member, in 1989, of the regions' appellation of origin system the Vintners Quality Alliance (VQA). The winery's focus is on Chardonnay, Riesling, Pinot Grigio, and Sauvignon Blanc for the whites, and Pinot Noir, Cabernet Franc/Cabernet Sauvignon/Merlot blends for the reds. They are also well known for their Baco Noir. Riesling and Cabernet Franc icewine along with their well-regarded Cuvée Catharine sparkling wines are also in their portfolio.

== Sustainability ==
In 2006, Henry of Pelham was the first vineyard to be certified as local and sustainable by Local Food Plus. In 2017, they were certified by the Wine Council of Ontario as following sustainable winemaking practices from vine to table. A member of the Porto Protocol.

== Awards ==
1. 2014 Cuvée Catharine Estate Blanc de Blanc - Sparkling Wine of the Year - 26th Ontario Wine Awards
