= Twelve Mile Creek (Ontario) =

Waterway located on the Niagara Peninsula in Ontario, Canada

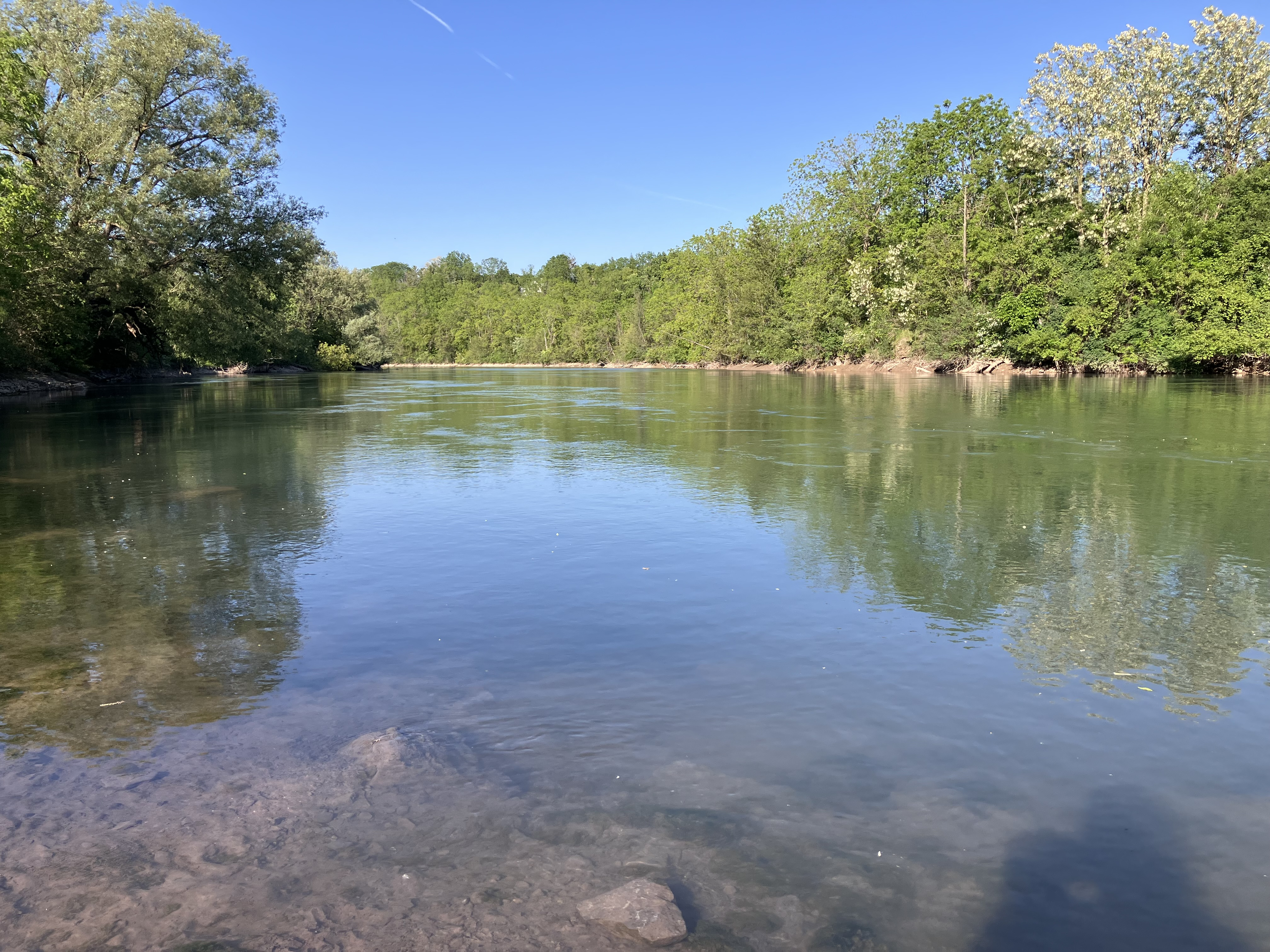
- Twelve Mile Creek in 2026

- Location of the mouth of the creek in Ontario

Location
- Country: Canada
- Province: Ontario
- Region: Southern Ontario
- Regional municipality: Niagara

Physical characteristics
- Source: Unnamed pond
  - location: Pelham
  - coordinates: 43°02′59″N 79°17′16″W
  - elevation: 194 m (636 ft)
- Mouth: Martindale Pond
  - location: St. Catharines
  - coordinates: 43°10′43″N 79°16′21″W
  - elevation: 85 m (279 ft)
- Basin size: 178 km^{2} (69 sq mi)

Basin features
- River system: Great Lakes Basin

Twelve Mile Creek is a waterway located on the Niagara Peninsula in the Regional Municipality of Niagara in Southern Ontario, Canada. Its headwaters are located in the town of Pelham, encompassing some of the most unspoiled and natural areas of Niagara area. The creek's lower reaches flow through urban areas of Thorold and St. Catharines and has been heavily altered by human activity for almost two centuries. The creek was first known as "Ashquasing" by the Mississaugas Indigenous people, the name meaning "that which lies at the end" in the Anishinaabe language.

== Watershed description ==
Twelve Mile Creek is named because its outlet to Lake Ontario is located approximately 12 miles (19 km) from the Niagara River. It drains a watershed of approximately 178 square kilometres (69 sq mi). This may be grouped into six sub-watersheds:

- Upper Twelve Mile Creek
- Lake Gibson System
- Richardson Creek
- Francis Creek
- Dicks Creek
- Lower Twelve Mile Creek

Of these, only the Upper Twelve Mile Creek can truly be considered to retain any significant degree of its natural state. This sub-watershed branches out into dozens of small streams and drains flowing through Short Hills Provincial Park and St. John's Conservation Area, as well as various natural, agricultural and lightly developed areas. The area containing the headwaters is known as the Fonthill Kame Delta Complex and was formed from debris left behind by glaciers as they retreated approximately 12,000 years ago. This area has the highest elevation, and contains the only identified cold water streams identified in the Niagara region. The area provides habitat for many bird species, including the Acadian flycatcher, hooded warbler, Louisiana waterthrush and Kentucky warbler.

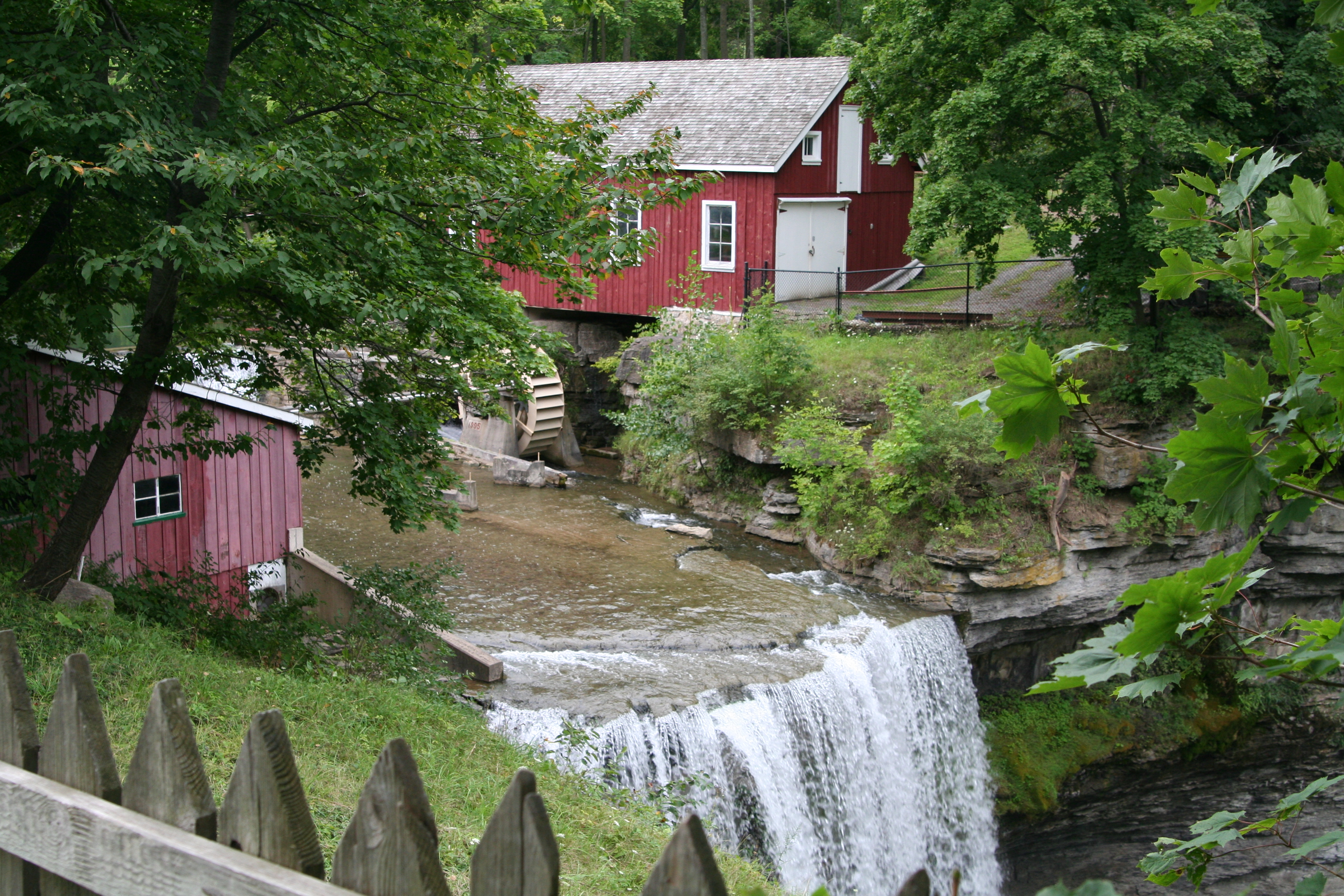
The Decew Falls, Niagara Escarpment, St. Catharines

Lake Gibson is not a natural feature, but rather an artificially created reservoir. Township maps from the latter half of the 19th century show a meandering stream flowing through this area (Beaverdams Creek) and plunging over the Niagara Escarpment at Decew Falls. This is the site of Morningstar Mill (still in existence today) which used this stream for power. This stream was subsequently dammed to provide a reservoir for hydroelectric generation at the Decew Falls Generation Station. The landscape was further altered with various channels and canals to improve flow to the generating station, and with the creation of additional reservoirs. Lake Gibson receives almost all of its water supply from Lake Erie via the Welland Canal. This reservoir also serves as the domestic water supply for the City of St Catharines.

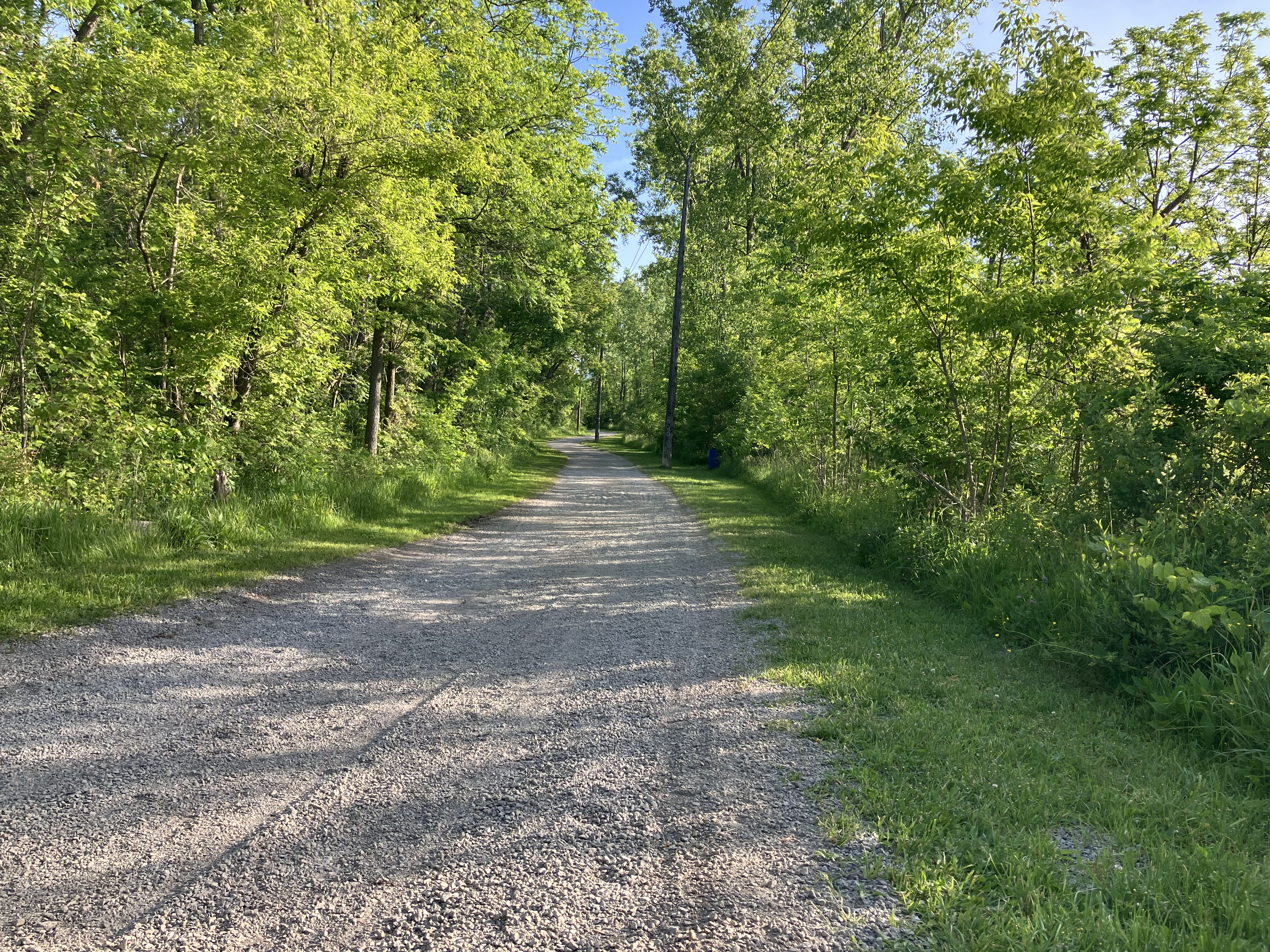
Trails along the banks of the river

Richardson Creek flows through mostly agricultural, but rapidly urbanizing land in the western part of St. Catharines. It is about 10.5 km (6.5 mi) in length. It combines with Francis Creek and empties into the Twelve Mile Creek at Martindale Pond, very close to its outlet. These two sub-watersheds therefore do not contribute to water flow on the great majority of the Twelve Mile Creek.

The Dicks Creek sub-watershed originates near the escarpment in a residential area, but afterwards flows into industrial and commercial areas. It flows through the abandoned second Welland Canal, passing through the stone locks which once carried ships, before entering a tunnel. It emerges from the tunnel and joins with the main branch of the Twelve Mile Creek immediately beside Highway 406, and not far from the downtown buildings of St. Catharines.

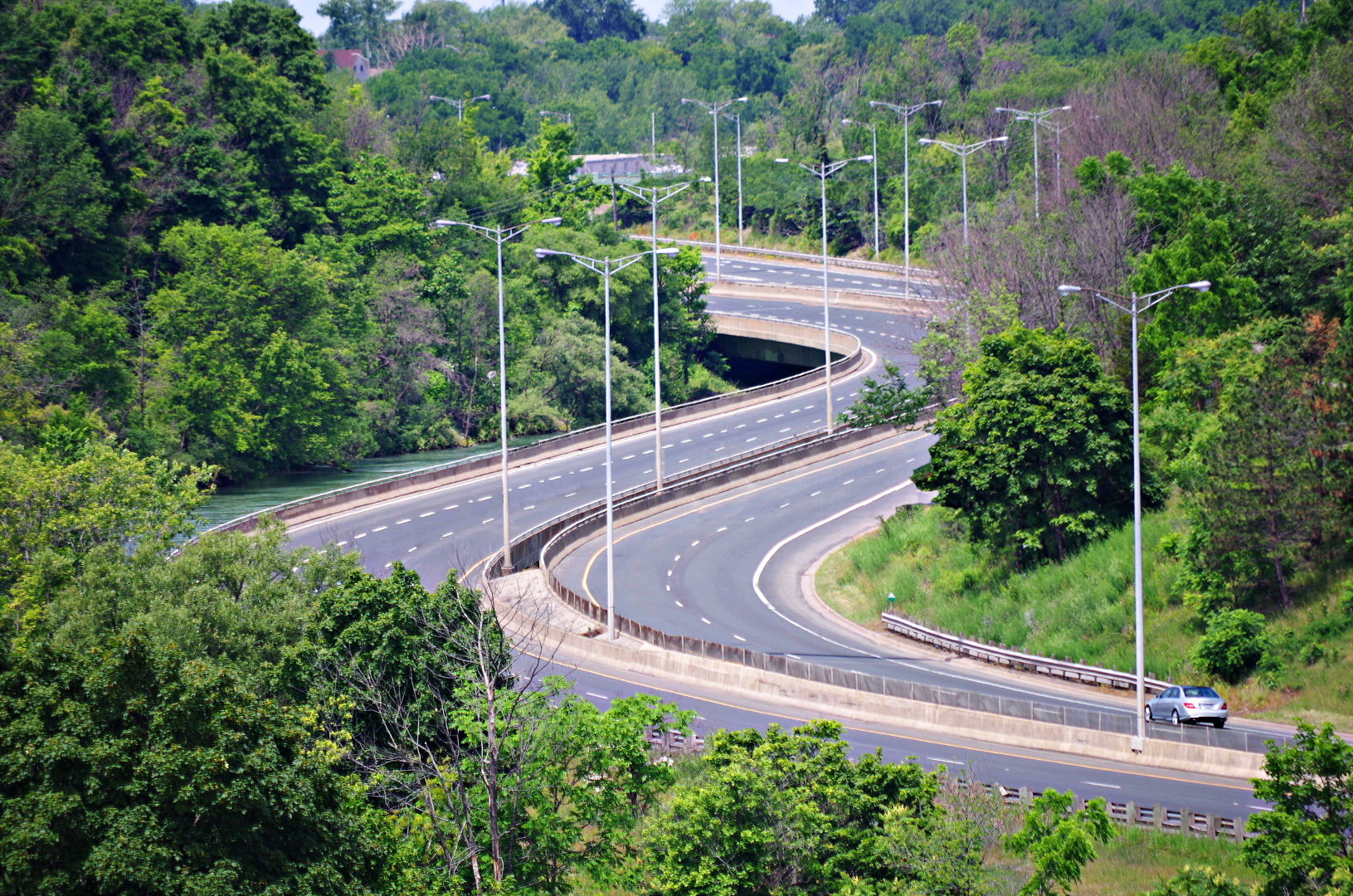
Highway 406 curves over Twelve Mile Creek in St. Catharines.

The lower portion of Twelve Mile Creek, while historically navigable as part of the second Welland Canal, is now a fast flowing river with rapids and a wide, swift water course. Almost all of the water (98 to 99%) in this portion of the creek is from the Welland Canal by way of the Decew Falls generating stations. The creek empties into Martindale Pond, a small artificial lake near the shores of Lake Ontario created to permit navigation on the first Welland Canal. This body of water also served as the route for the second and third canals and remains of locks from the second and third canals are still visible. Martindale Pond is now the site of the Royal Canadian Henley Regatta course. The water flows over a weir into Port Dalhousie harbour, and finally out into Lake Ontario between two long piers.

== The early Welland Canal ==
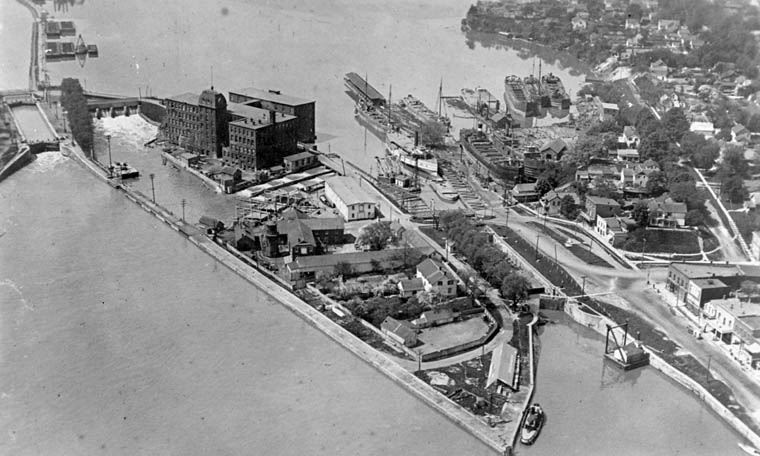
Aerial photo of the mouth of Twelve Mile Creek at Port Dalhousie, showing locks from the second canal (right) and third canal (left)

In the period following the War of 1812, assorted mills made use of water power from various creeks which flowed over Niagara Escarpment. Among these was a sawmill and a grist mill on Twelve Mile Creek owned by William Hamilton Merritt. Merritt's mills were plagued by low water conditions, especially in late summer - exactly when the grain harvest needed to be ground. He conceived of an idea to divert water from the Welland River to augment the water supply. The idea of a navigable canal across the Niagara Peninsula had come up in the past and it did not take long before Merritt's idea was expanded to include such a navigable waterway. In spite of initial plans, the water source for the canal was initially the Grand River via the Feeder Canal, as opposed to the Welland River. The modern canal receives its water directly from Lake Erie. Twelve Mile Creek was not necessarily the best route for the canal, but it was the location of Merritt's mills, so economic motivation became a factor. Ultimately, the first two Welland Canals were routed via Twelve Mile Creek. The third bypassed most of the creek, but continued to use its outlet to Lake Ontario.

Early maps show that the creek meandered greatly in its lower reaches. These meanders were flooded by means of a dam at Port Dalhousie, Ontario to create Martindale Pond. Further upstream, the first canal generally followed the bends in the creek, but most were straightened for the second canal resulting in the lower creek now being almost straight.

== Hydroelectric development ==
Just as water once powered mills directly, it continues to power industrial and domestic uses through generation of electricity. On a significantly smaller scale than the nearby Niagara Falls generating stations, the two DeCew Falls stations take their water supply from the Lake Gibson system, which is in turn fed mainly from Lake Erie via the Welland Canal. The DeCew Falls 1 station was originally put into service in 1898 and produces 23MW of power. The DeCew Falls 2 station has been in service since 1943 (unit 1) and 1948 (unit 2) and produces 144MW of power. Water from these plants is discharged into the lower Twelve Mile Creek.

== Current state of the creek ==
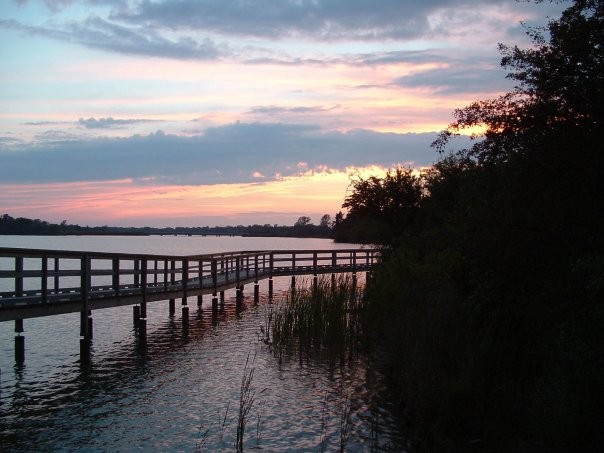
A boardwalk in Mel Swart Park along the shore of Lake Gibson is one example of the recreational use of the Twelve Mile Creek watershed.

Large segments of Twelve Mile Creek are available for public access. Walking and cycling trails line most of the lower creek. Short Hills Provincial Park and St. John's Conservation Area provide both conservation and public access to the creek's upper reaches. Parks and trails are present in several areas around Lake Gibson and the Bruce Trail crosses the upper portion of the watershed. Historic sites such as Morningstar Mill and remnants of the early Welland Canals are preserved and accessible.

The creek, however, is facing challenges from increasing urbanization and from agricultural, industrial and domestic pollution. The lower reaches are not in anything resembling a natural state, having been straightened, dredged and fed massively increased water flows. Dick's Creek flows through old stone locks and, in some areas, in tunnels. Other tributaries flow through flood control channels. Similarly, the Lake Gibson system bears little resemblance to Beaverdams Creek which once flowed through this area.

Twelve Mile Creek is a study in contrasts - in some areas, one of the most natural, and in other areas, one of the most altered watersheds in Niagara.

== See also ==
- List of rivers of Ontario
