= Thorold =

City in Ontario, Canada

- City (lower-tier)
- City of Thorold
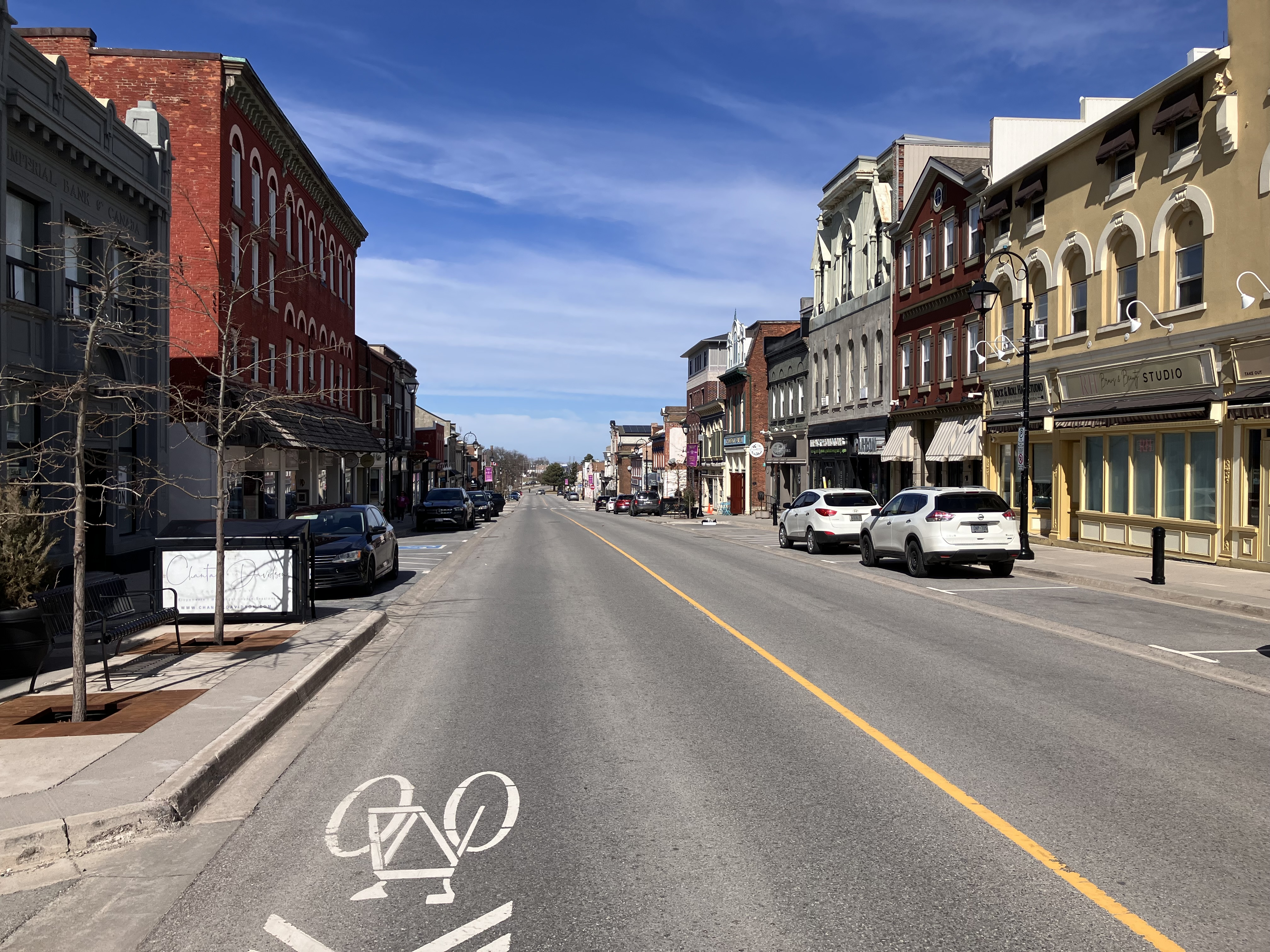
- Downtown Thorold in 2026

- Flag Seal

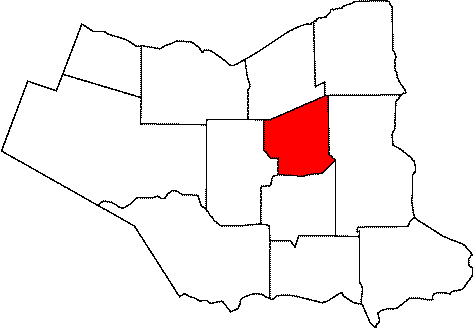
- Location of Thorold in the Niagara Region

- Location in southern Ontario
- Coordinates: 43°07′N 79°12′W
- Country: Canada
- Province: Ontario
- Region: Niagara
- Incorporated: 1850 (village)
- 1870 (town)
- 1975 (city)

Government
  - Mayor: Terry Ugulini
  - Governing body: Thorold City Council
  - MP: Fred Davies
  - MPP: Jeff Burch

Area
  - Land: 83.29 km^{2} (32.16 sq mi)
- Elevation: 162 m (531 ft)

Population (2021)
  - Total: 23,816
  - Density: 285.9/km^{2} (740/sq mi)
- Time zone: UTC-5 (Eastern (EST))
  - Summer (DST): UTC-4 (EDT)
- Postal code: L2V, L2T, L0S
- Area codes: 905, 289, 365, and 742
- Website: www.thorold.ca

Thorold is a city in Ontario, Canada, located on the Niagara Escarpment. It is also the seat of the Regional Municipality of Niagara. The Welland Canal passes through the city, featuring lock 7 and the Twin Flight Locks.

== History ==
The first survey of Thorold, or Township 9 as it was known then, occurred in 1788. The earliest communities in what is now Thorold emerged at Beaverdams, DeCew Falls and St. Johns. In 1846, the community had a population of about 1,000 and there were three churches or chapels and a post office. Various types of tradesmen worked here. Industry included two grist mills, a cement mill, a brewery and three wagon makers. There were seven taverns. Thorold, located on the brow of the Niagara Escarpment, soon became dominant and was incorporated as a village in 1850. Its formation was linked to the creation of the First Welland Canal. The village experienced population growth as the canal became more developed. In 1875, Thorold became a town.

When the Regional Municipality of Niagara was formed in 1970, the Town of Thorold expanded to include the former Thorold Township. In 1975, the town became incorporated as the City of Thorold.

Thorold is also the location of the War of 1812 battle site, Beaverdams, where, on June 25, 1813, Colonel Charles Boerstler and his American troops were defeated by the British regulars and Caughnawaga Mohawks.

The 2021 Canadian census identified Thorold as the eighth-fastest growing municipality in Canada.

== Demographics ==
Historical populations
Year	Pop.	±%
1841	1,000	—
1871	1,635	+63.5%
1901	1,979	+21.0%
1911	2,273	+14.9%
1921	4,825	+112.3%
1931	5,092	+5.5%
1941	5,284	+3.8%
1951	6,397	+21.1%
1961	8,633	+35.0%
1971	15,065	+74.5%
1981	15,412	+2.3%
1991	17,542	+13.8%
1996	17,883	+1.9%
2001	18,048	+0.9%
2006	18,224	+1.0%
2011	17,931	−1.6%
2016	18,801	+4.9%
2021	23,816	+26.7%

In the 2021 Census of Population conducted by Statistics Canada, Thorold had a population of 23,816 living in 9,095 of its 9,856 total private dwellings, a change of 26.7% from its 2016 population of 18,801. With a land area of 83.29 km^{2} (32.16 sq mi), it had a population density of 285.9/km^{2} (740.6/sq mi) in 2021.

== Economy ==
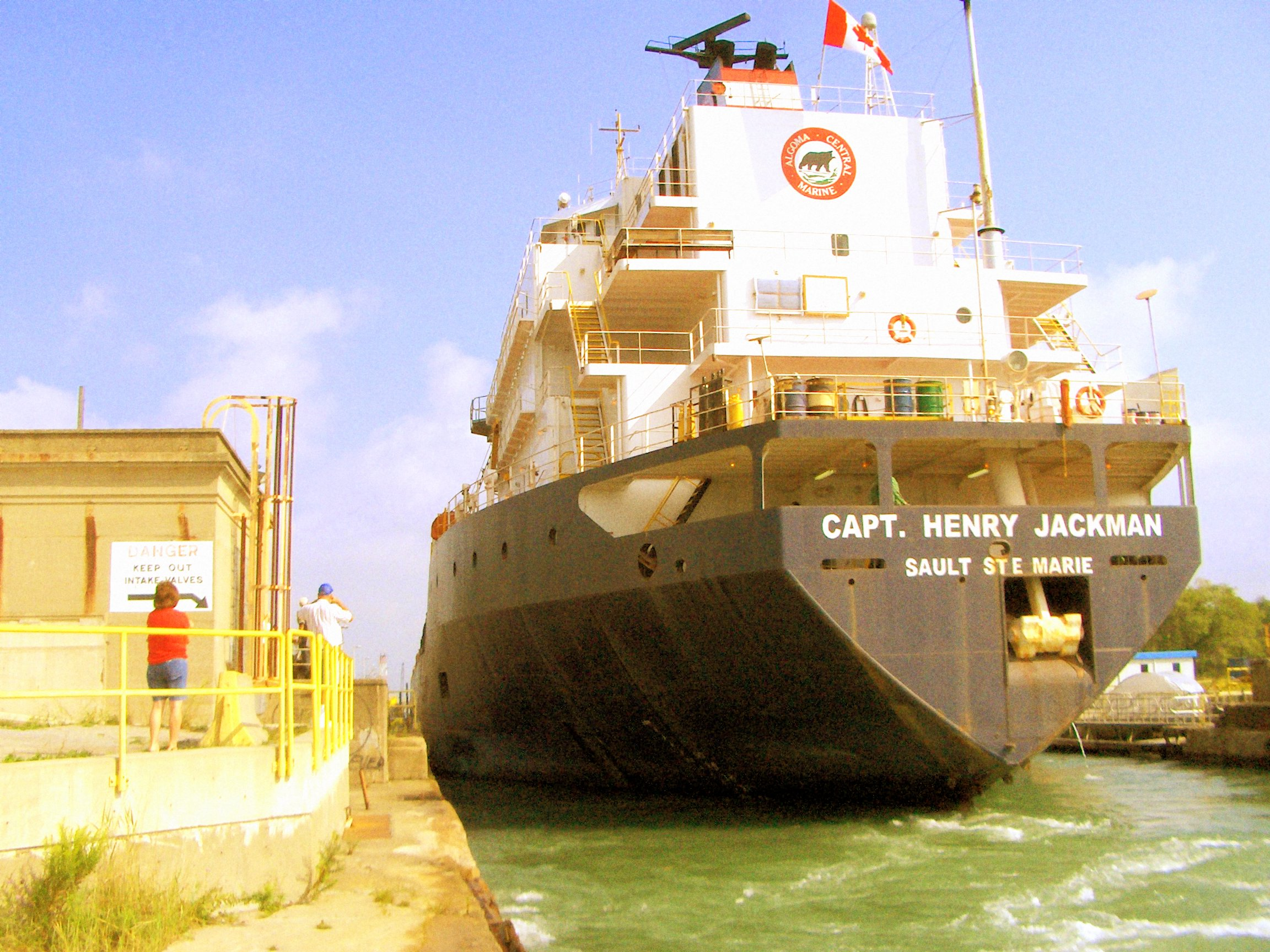
A ship passing through Thorold

Thorold's economy, like other municipalities in the Niagara Region, has benefitted from the Welland Canal. An estimated 37 million tonnes of freight is handled and shipped there annually.

Thorold South has several industrial and manufacturing businesses.

== Arts and culture ==
The Thorold Reed Band has been in operation since its formation in 1851. The band has performed every year, with the exception of 2020 and 2021, due to the COVID-19 pandemic in Ontario. The Canal Bank Shuffle is an annual musical festival that takes place in Thorold. The event features blues music.

In July 2024, downtown Thorold was used as a filming location for the eighteenth season of Murdoch Mysteries. 11 scenes were filmed in the city. Thorold was chosen due to its proximity to other filming locations and the lack of "contamination" in historical buildings. The setting being filmed for the series was Grimsby.

== Attractions ==
=== Parks and trails ===
Officially opened in 2002, the Mel Swart Lake Gibson Conservation Park is a 29-acre waterfront park located on Lake Gibson. The park is part of the Niagara Greenbelt. The Short Hills Provincial Park is also partially located in the City of Thorold.

The Welland Canal Parkway Trail is a paved 42 km recreational path along the Welland Canal, from Lake Ontario to Lake Erie.

=== Historic sites ===
There are multiple historic sites in Thorold. These include:

The DeCew House in 1925.	The Decew House, which was the destination of Laura Secord's journey to warn the British of a planned American attack. Thanks to her warning, FitzGibbon was prepared for the attack, and in the ensuing Battle of Beaver Dams was able to secure the surrender of an American force of approximately 500 men. In 1950, it was destroyed by a fire.
	The Old Fire Hall at 12 Albert Street West. It was constructed in 1878 and designed by the architect John Latshaw. The building was repurposed as a design studio.
	Thorold's Carnegie Library, which opened in 1912 and closed in 1983.
	Chestnut Hall is a historic building that was the home of John McDonagh, who was the mayor of the Village of Thorold. It was then used for the city hall. It is attached to the current Thorold Public Library.
	The St. Johns Common School was the first non-denominational free school in Upper Canada, and remained in use until 1844, when a new school was built nearby. The cabin continues to be used for educational purposes, and is the oldest extant public school in Ontario.
	The Keefer Mansion is a building with ten rooms and bathrooms. It is also known as Maplehurst. It is owned by the city and has been leased as an inn.
	Welland Mills was a flour mill built by Jacob Keefer in 1846-47.
	The Beaverdams Church, which opened in 1832.

== Sports ==
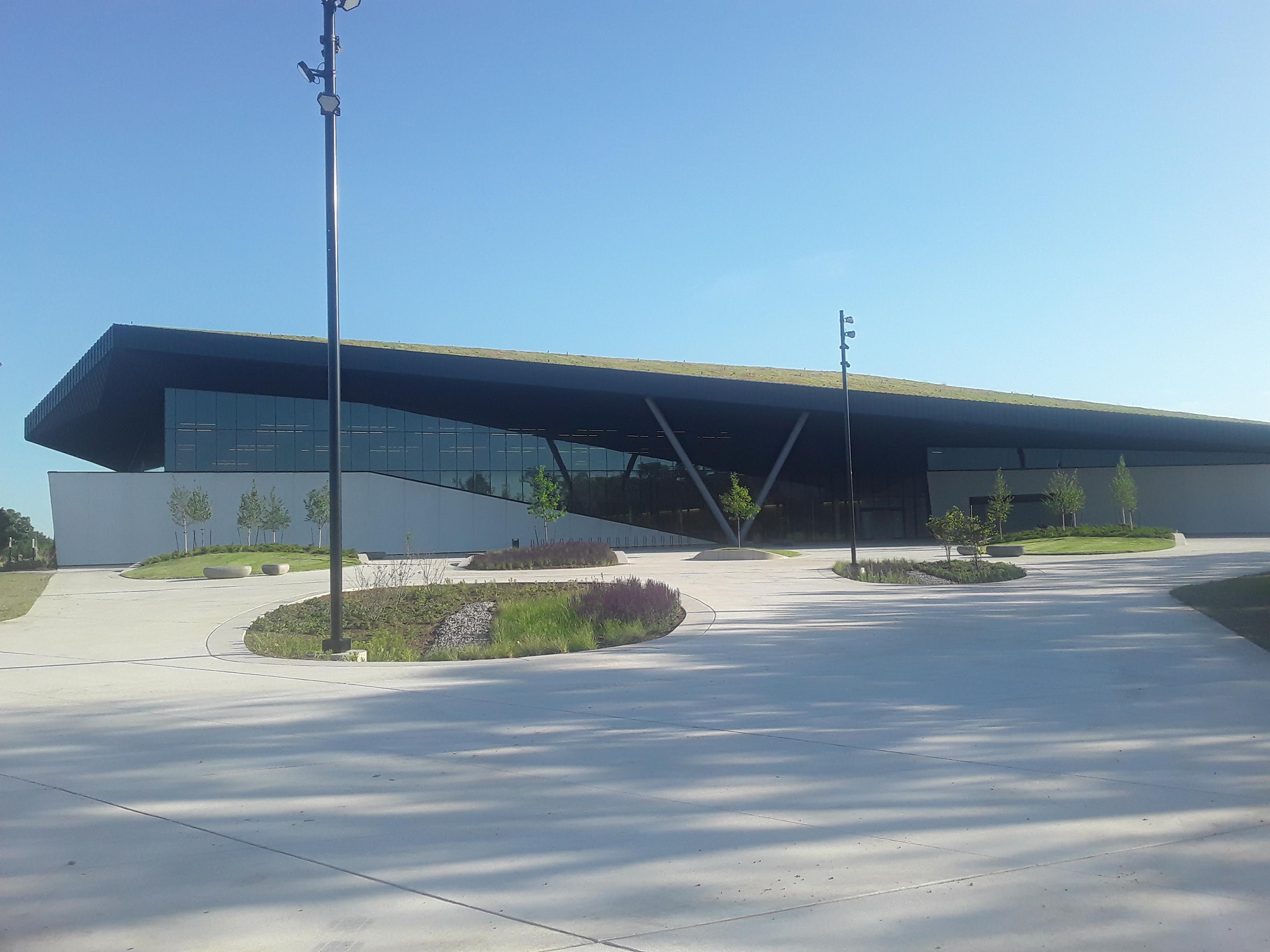
The Canada Games Park in 2022

The Thorold Blackhawks are a Junior 'B' hockey team in the Greater Ontario Junior Hockey League. In 2023, the team permanently moved to Port Colborne from Thorold.

Thorold, along with other municipalities in the Niagara Region, hosted events for the 2022 Canada Summer Games. The Canada Games Park was built in Thorold for the event. The facility cost 102.7 million dollars. In 2023, it was determined by a municipal lawyer that the city of Thorold did not own the arena and was instead one of three co-tenants leasing it from Brock University.

== Infrastructure ==
In 2015, the Ontario government provided money to Thorold under the Small Communities Fund. The city used the 4.6 million dollars in funding to start building an affordable housing complex for seniors. 14.8 million dollars through the National Housing Co-Investment Fund was also used for the project.

=== Transportation ===
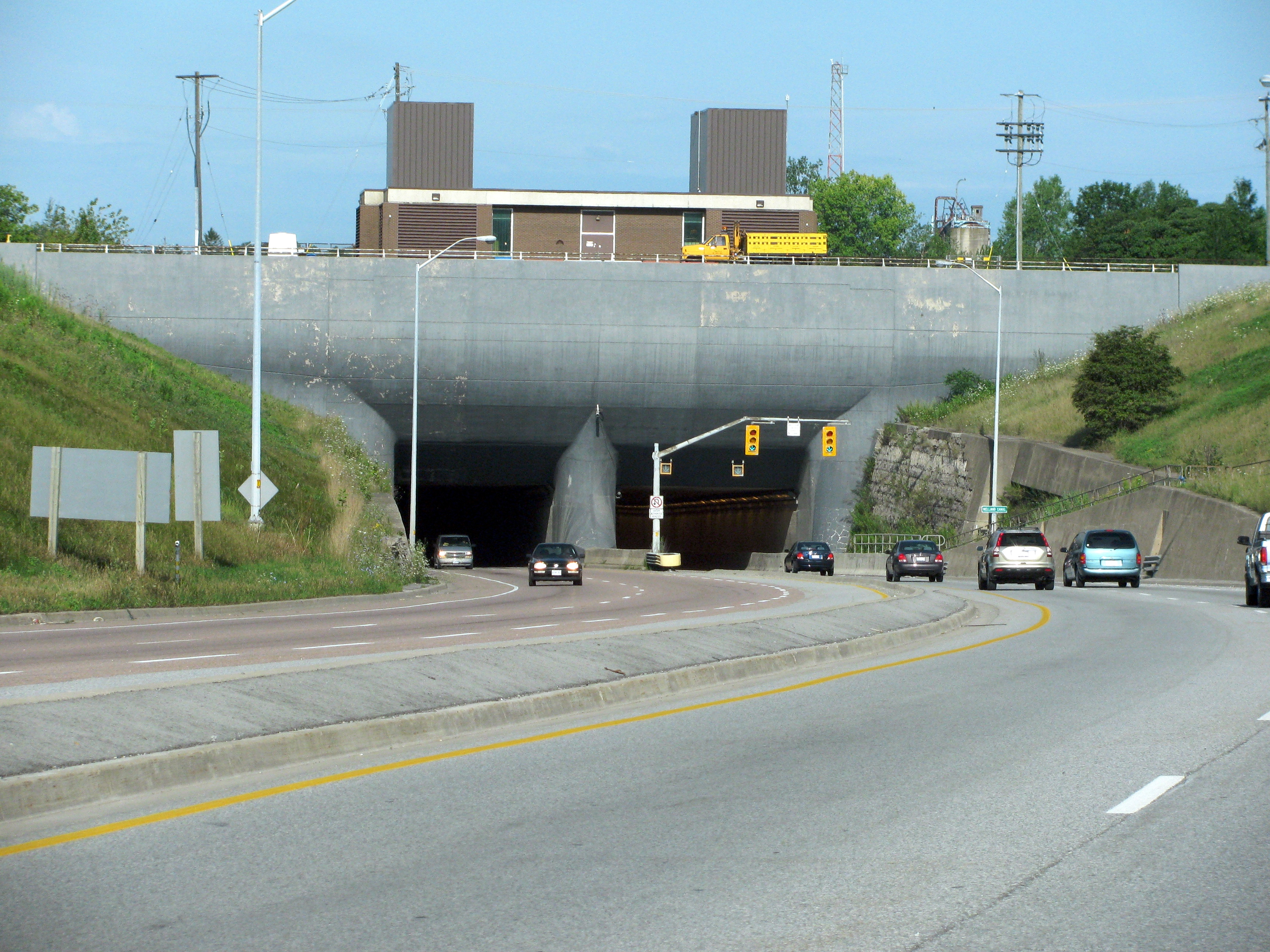
The Thorold Tunnel

The Thorold Tunnel is an underwater vehicular tunnel, built between 1965 and 1967, which allows Highway 58 to cross the Welland Canal without interrupting shipping. Approximately 24,300 vehicles pass through the tunnel daily.

=== Niagara Detention Centre ===
Thorold is home to the Niagara Detention Centre, a 260-person capacity maximum-security prison. It generally serves people on remand, offenders sentenced to short terms (60 days or less), and offenders awaiting transfer to larger federal or provincial facilities.

== Education ==
Thorold Secondary School is the only high school in the city. In 2012, District School Board of Niagara trustees voted on whether to close the school and decided to keep it open. Thorold is close in proximity to Brock University and therefore has a large student population. In 2021, four students were arrested after a large street party took place in the city.

== Notable people ==
- Owen Nolan, professional hockey player
- Joey Martin (ice hockey), professional hockey player
- Sean Bentivoglio, professional hockey player
- Conor Timmins, professional hockey player

== See also ==
- List of townships in Ontario
- List of municipalities in Ontario
