= Short Hills Provincial Park =

Provincial park in Ontario, Canada

- IUCN category II (national park)
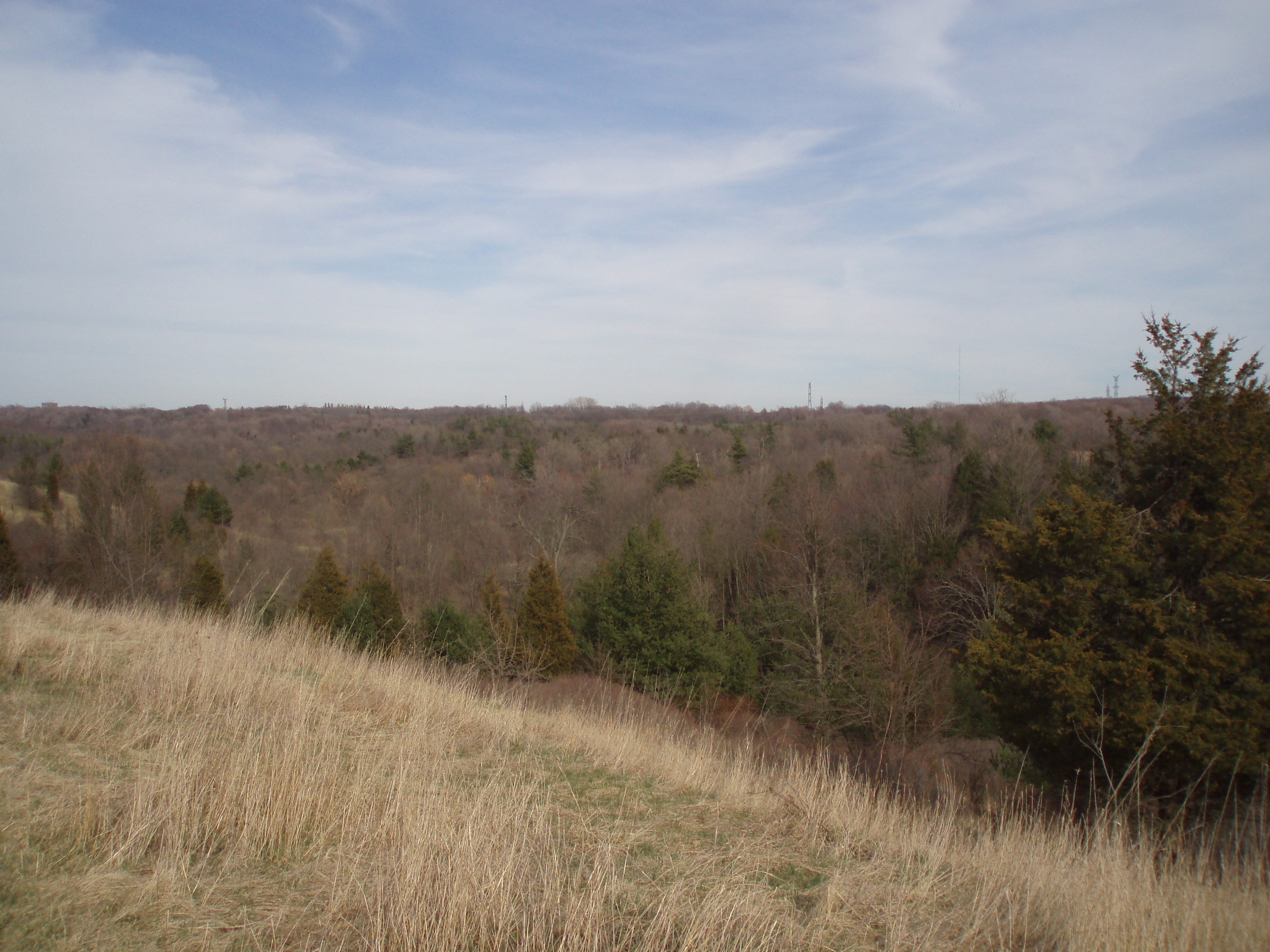

- Location within Southern Ontario
- Interactive map of Short Hills Provincial Park
- Nearest city: St. Catharines
- Coordinates: 43°06′43″N 79°15′56″W
- Area: 660 ha (1,600 acres)
- Established: 1985
- Governing body: Ontario Parks

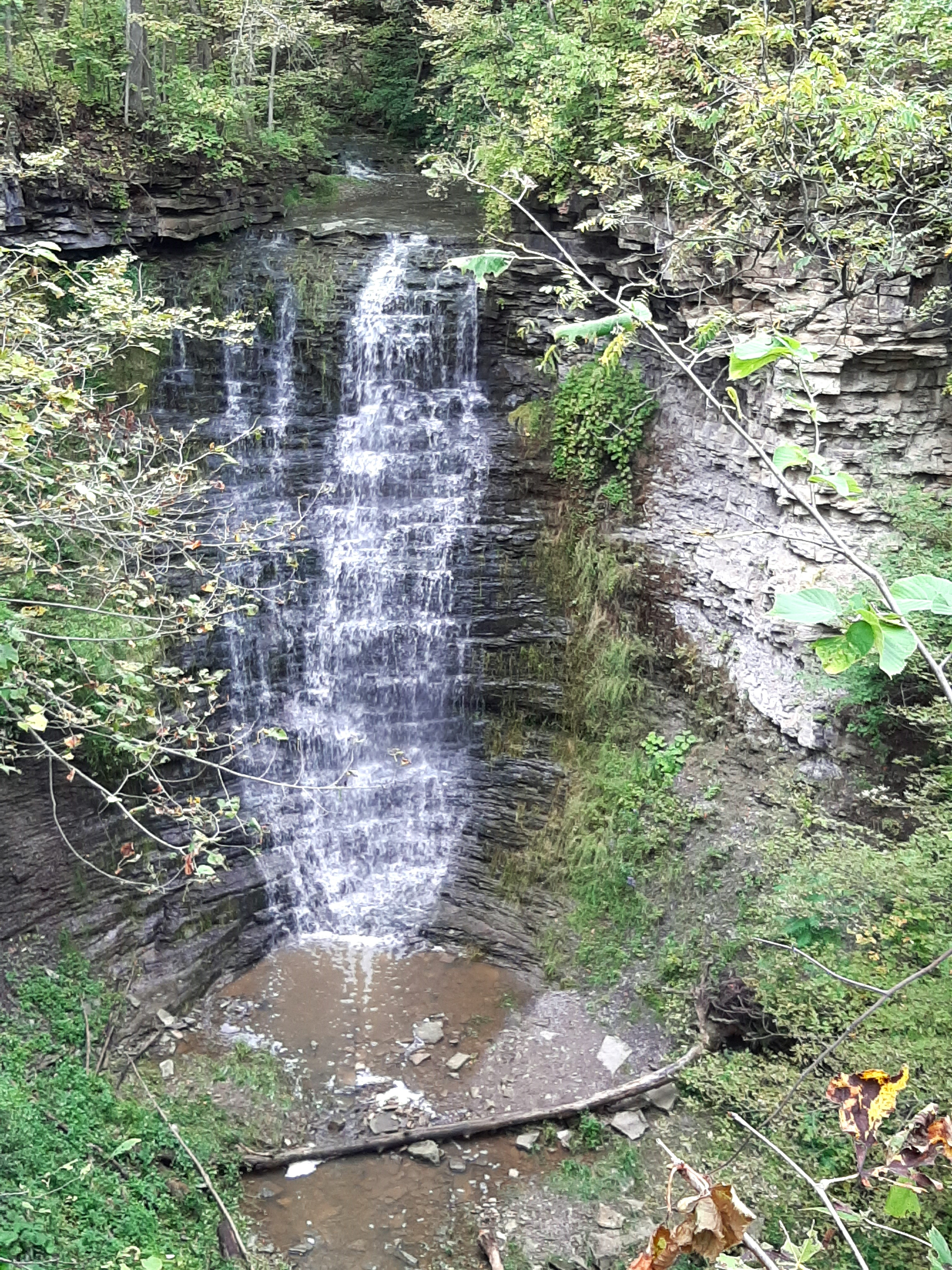
Short Hills Provincial Park-Swayze Falls- Trail # 1

Short Hills Provincial Park is a provincial park located in the centre of the Niagara Peninsula, bordering the city of St. Catharines and the town of Pelham in the Niagara Region in southern Ontario, Canada. First established in 1985, it occupies an area of 660 hectares (1,600 acres). It also borders the new vineyard sub-appellation called the Short Hills Bench.

Located on the southern edge of the Niagara Escarpment, the park is a jumble of small but steep hills ("short hills") and valleys created by the last ice age. The effect was only compounded when the Twelve Mile Creek cut through the sedimentary deposits and glacial till.

Wildlife inhabiting the park include white-tailed deer, coyote, and meadow vole. Being at the north end of the Carolinian zone, many plants grow here that do not grow or are rarely found in other parts of Canada, including pawpaw, sweet chestnut and tulip-tree.

The only park of its scale in Niagara, Short Hills Provincial Park is a prime destination for residents of nearby cities, especially St. Catharines and Niagara Falls. Popular activities include hiking, horseback riding, fishing and mountain biking.

The park features six side trails, including the Bruce Trail, and several waterfalls. Its terrain consists of dense forests, open meadows, creeks, and hills.

== Annual Traditional Deer Harvest ==
Short Hills is used as a location for the traditional Haudenosaunee deer harvest. Indigenous rights to the deer harvest comprises part of the treaty agreement with the Haudenosaunee Confederacy, which preserves their right to hunt on lands they had previously sold or ceded.
