= Coureur des bois =

French-Canadian independent fur traders

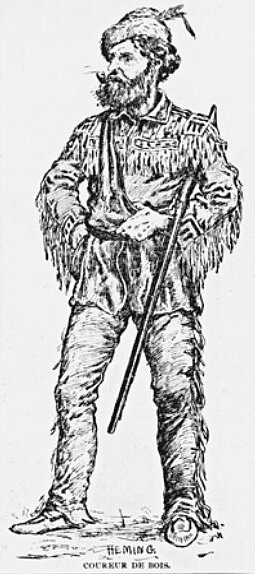
Coureur de bois, a woodcut by Arthur Heming (1870–1940)

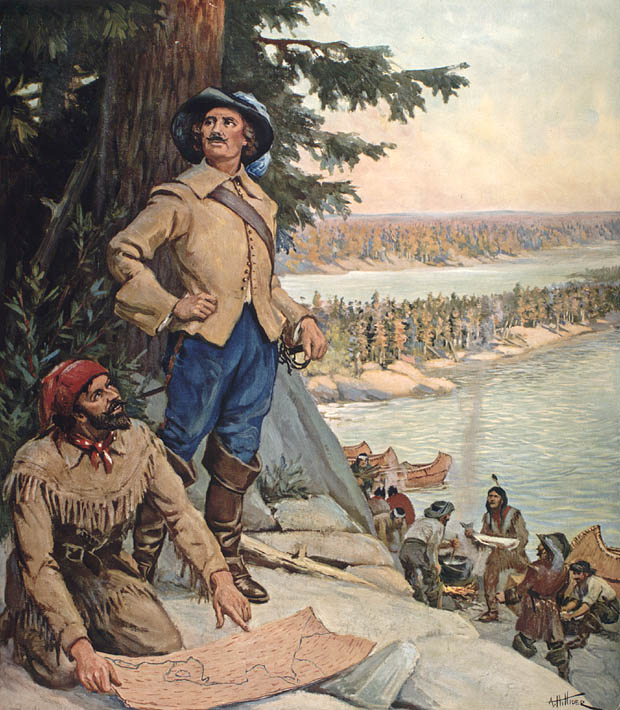
A coureur des bois in the painting La Vérendrye at the Lake of the Woods, circa 1900–1930

A coureur des bois (French: [kuʁœʁ de bwɑ]; lit. 'runner of the woods') or coureur de bois (French: [kuʁœʁ də bwɑ]; pl. coureurs de(s) bois) were independent entrepreneurial French Canadian traders who travelled in New France and the interior of North America, usually to trade with First Nations peoples by exchanging various European items for furs. Sometimes they operated in competition with the larger and licensed voyageurs. Some coureurs des bois learned the trades and practices of the indigenous peoples, and even went into business with them.

These expeditions were part of the beginning of the fur trade in the North American interior. Initially they traded for beaver coats and furs. However, as the market grew, coureurs de bois were trapping and trading prime beavers whose skins were to be felted in Europe.

== Evolution ==
While French settlers had lived and traded alongside Indigenous people since the earliest days of New France, coureurs des bois reached their apex during the second half of the 17th century. After 1681, the independent coureur des bois was gradually replaced by state-sponsored voyageurs, who were workers associated with licensed fur traders. They travelled extensively by canoe. Coureurs des bois lost their importance in the fur trade by the early 18th century. Yet, even while their numbers were dwindling, the coureur des bois developed as a symbol of the colony, creating a lasting myth that would continue to define New France for centuries.

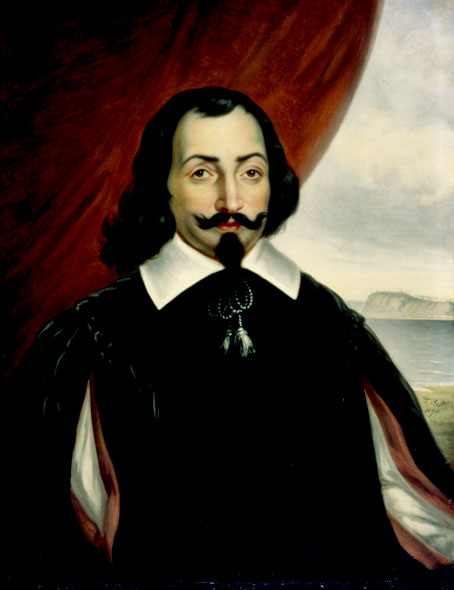
Depiction of Samuel de Champlain (1574–1635) by Theophile Hamel (1870)

=== 1610–1630: early explorers and interpreters ===
Shortly after founding a permanent settlement at Quebec City in 1608, Samuel de Champlain sought to ally himself with the local native peoples or First Nations. He decided to send French boys to live among them to learn their languages in order to serve as interpreters, in the hope of persuading the natives to trade with the French rather than with the Dutch, who were active along the Hudson River and Atlantic coast.

The boys learned native languages, customs, and skills, and tended to assimilate quickly to their new environments. A year after leaving Étienne Brûlé in 1610, with a Huron tribe, Champlain visited him and was surprised to find the young man attired completely in native clothing and able to converse fluently in the Huron language.

Early explorers such as Brûlé educated the French colonists on the complex trading networks of the natives, served as interpreters, and encouraged the burgeoning fur trade. Between 1610 and 1629, dozens of Frenchmen spent months at a time living among the natives. Over time, these early explorers and interpreters played an increasingly active role in the fur trade, paving the way for the emergence of the coureurs des bois proper in the mid-17th century.

=== 1649–1681: Rise ===
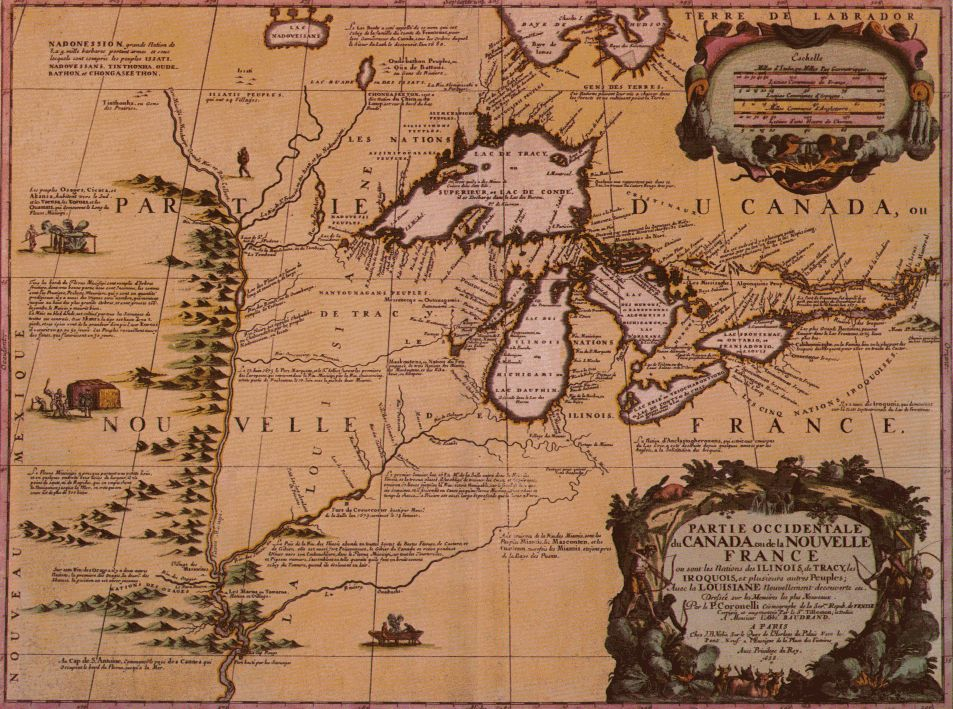
Map of Great Lakes Region of New France, 1688 (by Vincenzo Coronelli 1650–1718)

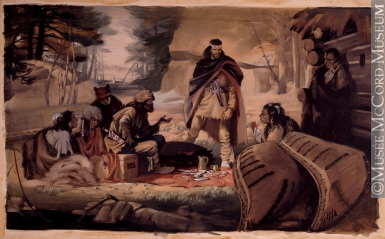
Radisson & Groseillers Established the Fur Trade in the Great North West, 1662, by Archibald Bruce Stapleton (1917–1950)

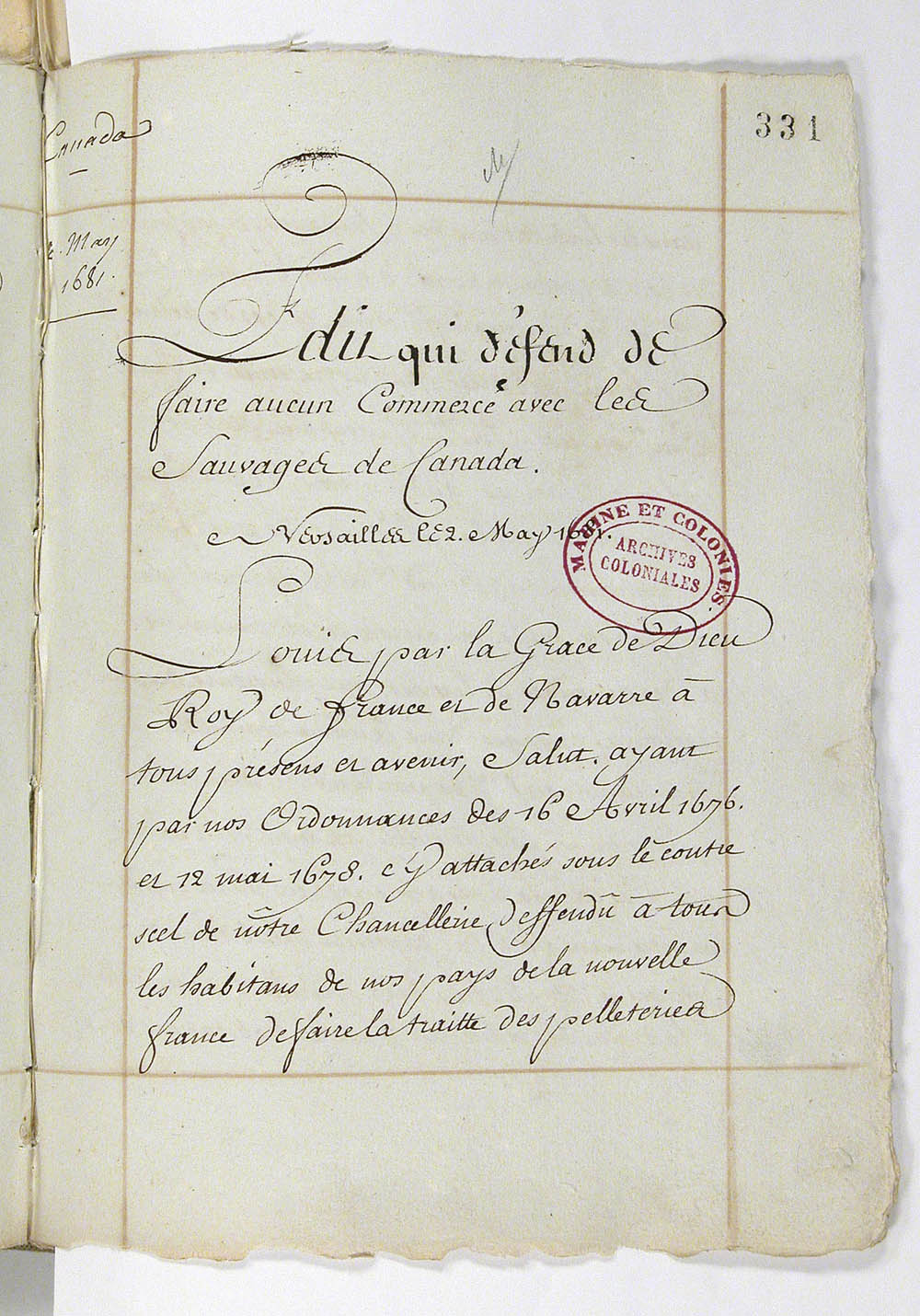
Edict of the King of France in 1681, limiting fur trade participation

The term "coureur des bois" is most strongly associated with those who engaged in the fur trade in ways that were considered to be outside of the mainstream. Early in the North American fur trade era, this term was applied to men who circumvented the normal channels by going deeper into the wilderness to trade.

Traditionally, the government of New France preferred to let the natives supply furs directly to French merchants, and discouraged French settlers from venturing outside the Saint Lawrence valley. By the mid-17th century, Montreal had emerged as the center of the fur trade, hosting a yearly fair in August where natives exchanged their pelts for European goods. While coureurs des bois never entirely disappeared, they were heavily discouraged by French colonial officials. In 1649, the new governor Louis d'Ailleboust permitted Frenchmen familiar with the wilderness to visit Huron Country to encourage and escort Hurons to Montreal to participate in the trade. While this did not legally sanction coureurs des bois to trade independently with the natives, some historians consider d'Ailleboust's encouragement of independent traders to mark the official emergence of the coureurs des bois.

In the 1660s, several factors resulted in a sudden spike in the number of coureurs des bois. First, the population of New France markedly increased during the late 17th century, as the colony experienced a boom in immigration between 1667–84. Of the new engagés (indentured male servants), discharged soldiers, and youthful immigrants from squalid, class-bound Europe arriving in great numbers in the colony, many chose freedom in the life of the coureur des bois. Furthermore, renewed peaceful relations with the Iroquois in 1667 made travelling into the interior of Canada much less perilous for the French colonists. The companies that had been monopolizing and regulating the fur trade since 1645, the Cent Associés and the Communautés des Habitants, went bankrupt after the Iroquois war. The Compagnie des Indes occidentales, which replaced them, was much less restrictive of internal trade, allowing independent merchants to become more numerous. Finally, a sudden fall in the price of beaver on the European markets in 1664 caused more traders to travel to the "pays d'en haut", or upper country (the area around the Great Lakes), in search of cheaper pelts. During the mid-1660s, therefore, becoming a coureur des bois became both more feasible and profitable.

This sudden growth alarmed many colonial officials. In 1680, the intendant Duchesneau estimated there were eight hundred coureurs des bois, or about 40% of the adult male population. Reports like that were wildly exaggerated: in reality, even at their zenith coureurs des bois remained a very small percentage of the population of New France.

=== 1681–1715: Decline ===
In 1681, to curb the unregulated business of independent traders and their burgeoning profits, French minister of marine Jean-Baptiste Colbert created a system of licences for fur traders, known as congés. Initially, this system granted 25 annual licences to merchants travelling inland. The recipients of these licences came to be known as "voyageurs" (travellers), who canoed and portaged fur trade goods in the employ of a licensed fur trader or fur trading company. The congé system, therefore, created the voyageur, the legal and respectable counterpart to the coureur des bois. Under the voyageurs, the fur trade began to favour a more organized business model of the times, including monopolistic ownership and hired labour. From 1681 onwards, therefore, the voyageurs began to eclipse the coureurs des bois, although coureurs des bois continued to trade without licences for several decades. Following the implementation of the congé system, the number of coureurs des bois dwindled, as did their influence within the colony.

== Lifestyle ==
=== Skills ===
A successful coureur des bois had to possess many skills, including those of businessman and expert canoeist. To survive in the Canadian wilderness, coureurs des bois also had to be competent in a range of activities including fishing, snowshoeing and hunting. As one Jesuit described them, venturing into the wilderness suited:

The sort of person who thought nothing of covering five to six hundred leagues by canoe, paddle in hand, or of living off corn and bear fat for twelve to eighteen months, or of sleeping in bark or branch cabins.

The life was physically arduous and succeeding as a coureur was extremely difficult. But the hope of making a profit motivated many, while the promise of adventure and freedom was enough to convince others to become coureurs.

=== Long distance fur trade and canoe travel ===
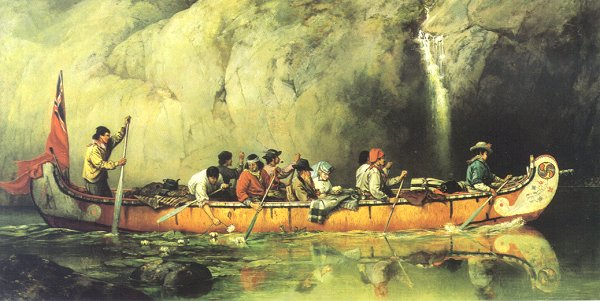
Canoe Manned by Voyageurs Passing a Waterfall 1868, by Frances Anne Hopkins (1838–1919)

Because of the lack of roads and the necessity to transport heavy goods and furs, fur trade in the interior of the continent depended on men conducting long-distance transportation by canoe of fur trade goods, and returning with pelts. Early travel was dangerous and the coureurs des bois, who traded in uncharted territory, had a high mortality rate. Typically, they left Montreal in the spring, as soon as the rivers and lakes were clear of ice (usually May), their canoes loaded with supplies and goods for trading. The course west to the richest beaver lands usually went by way of the Ottawa and Mattawa rivers; it required numerous overland portages. Alternatively, some canoes proceeded by way of the upper St. Lawrence River and the lakes, passing by Detroit on the way to Michilimackinac or Green Bay. This route had fewer portages, but in times of war, it was more exposed to Iroquois attacks. The powerful Five Nations of the Confederacy had territory along the Great Lakes and sought to control their hunting grounds.

Such trading journeys often lasted for months and covered thousands of kilometers, with the coureurs des bois sometimes paddling twelve hours a day. Packing a canoe for such a trip was often arduous, as more than thirty articles were considered essential for a coureur des bois's survival and business. He could trade for food, hunt, and fish—but trade goods such as "broadcloth, linen and wool blankets, ammunition, metal goods (knives, hatchets, kettles), firearms, liquor, gunpowder and sometimes even finished clothing, took up the majority of space in the canoe." Food en route needed to be lightweight, practical and non-perishable.

=== Relationships with Indigenous Peoples ===
The business of a coureur des bois required close contact with Indigenous peoples. Native peoples were essential because they trapped the fur-bearing animals (especially beaver) and prepared the skins. Relations between coureurs and natives were not always peaceful, and could sometimes become violent. In general, trade was made much easier by the two groups maintaining friendly relations. Trade was often accompanied by reciprocal gift-giving; among the Algonquin and others, exchanging gifts was customary practice to maintain alliances. Pierre-Esprit Radisson and his companions, for instance, "struck agreeable relations with Natives inland by giving European goods as gifts".

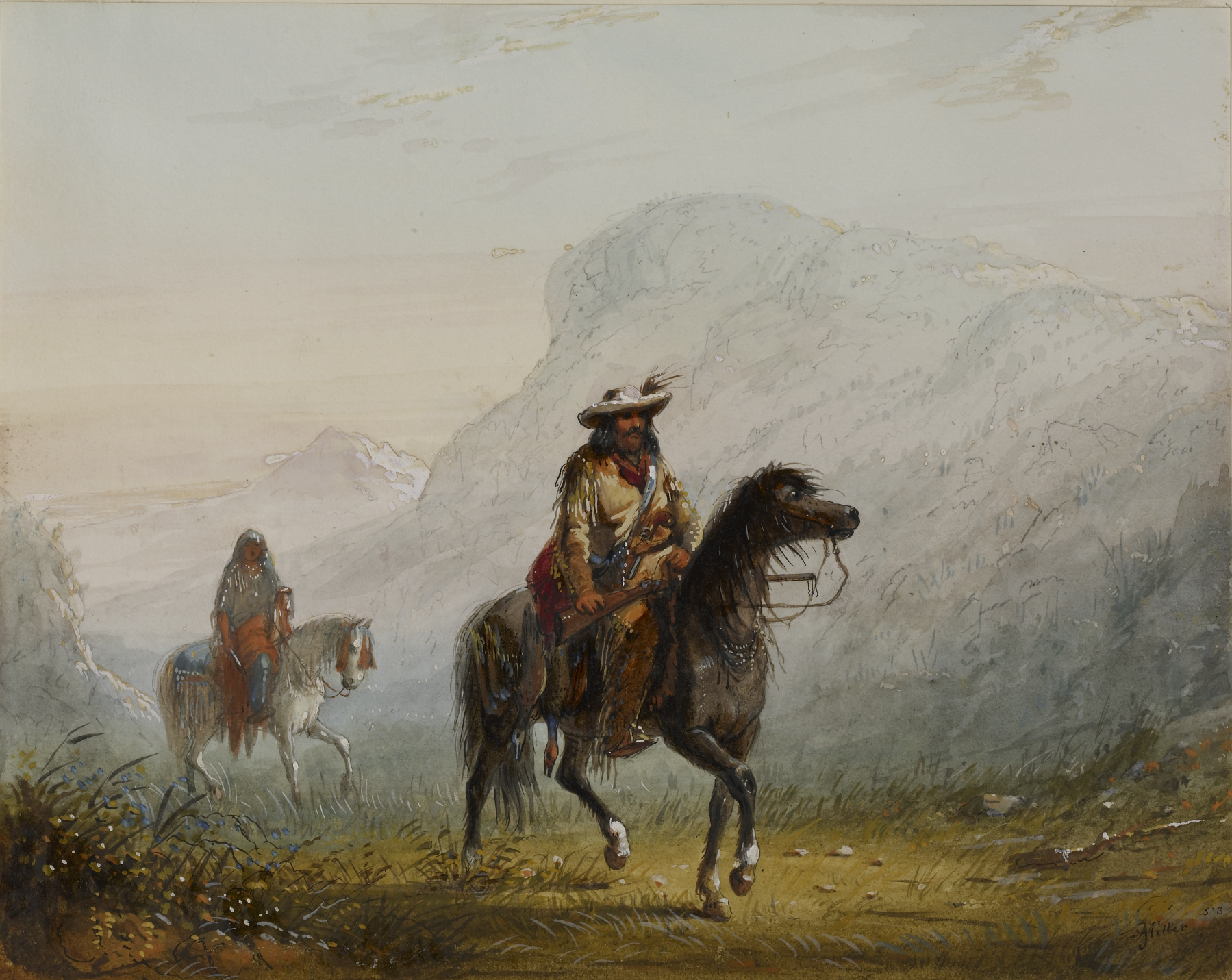
'Bourgeois' W---r, and His Squaw (A French trapper and a Native American woman) 1858–1860, by Alfred Jacob Miller (1810–1874)

Furthermore, relations between the coureur de bois and the natives often included a cultural dimension; marriage à la façon du pays (following local custom) was common between native women and coureurs des bois, and later between native women and voyageurs. These unions were of benefit to both sides, and in later years, winter partners of major trading companies also took native wives. As wives, indigenous women played a key role as translators, guides and mediators—becoming "women between". For one thing, Algonquin communities typically had far more women than men, likely as a result of warfare. The remaining marriages between Algonquins tended to be polygamous, with one husband marrying two or more women. Sexual relationships with coureurs des bois therefore offered native women an alternative to polygamy in a society with few available men.

To French military commanders, who were often also directly involved in the fur trade, such marriages were beneficial in that they improved relations between the French and the natives. Native leaders also encouraged such unions, particularly when the couple formed lasting, permanent bonds. Jesuits and some upper-level colonial officials viewed these relationships with disdain and disgust. French officials preferred coureurs des bois and voyageurs to settle around Quebec City and Montreal. They considered the lasting relationships with native women to be further proof of the lawlessness and perversion of the coureurs des bois.

== Myths ==
The role and importance of the coureurs des bois have been exaggerated over the course of history. This figure has achieved mythological status, leading to many false accounts, and to the coureurs des bois being assimilated with "Canadiens" (French Canadians).

The mythmaking followed two paths; initially, people in France judged the colonies according to the fears and apprehensions which they had of the Ancien Régime. If order and discipline were proving difficult to maintain in continental Europe, it seemed impossible that the colonies would fare any better, and it was presumed things would become even worse. Accounts of young men choosing a life where they would "do nothing", be "restrained by nothing", and live "beyond the possibility of correction" played into the French aristocracy's fears of insubordination which only served to confirm their ignorance; and coureurs des bois became emblematic of the colony for those in the metropolis.

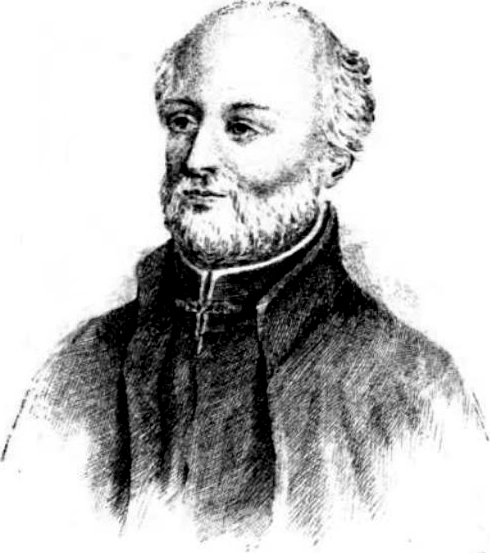
Pierre François Xavier de Charlevoix (1682–1761)

The myth of the coureurs des bois as representative of the Canadians was stimulated by the writings of 18th-century Jesuit priest F-X. Charlevoix and the 19th-century American historian Francis Parkman; their historical accounts are classified as belonging to popular rather than academic history. Charlevoix was particularly influential in his writings, because he was a trusted source of information, as he was a Jesuit priest who had journeyed in Canada. But his "historical" work has been criticized by historians for being too "light" and for relying too heavily on other authors' material (i.e. plagiarizing), rather than his own first-hand account. Critics of Charlevoix have also noted that in his account, he confuses different periods of time, and therefore does not differentiate between voyageurs and coureurs des bois, misrepresenting the importance of the latter in terms of number and proportion in terms on influence on trading. But Charlevoix was influential; his work was often cited by other authors, which further propagated the myth of the Canadian as a coureur des bois.

Finally, romans du terroir (rural novels) also added to the myth of the coureurs des bois by featuring them out of proportion to their number and influence. The coureurs des bois were portrayed in such works as extremely virile, free-spirited and of untameable natures, ideal protagonists in the romanticized novels of important 19th-century writers such as Chateaubriand, Jules Verne and Fenimore Cooper.

== Reputation ==
The coureurs des bois were known for their trapping abilities by outside parties but French Canadians knew these men as being looked upon without favour. The coureur des bois lived outside of the typical confines of society and had to adapt to the expectations of the Indigenous peoples around them. They did this by adopting the Indigenous people's ritual practices and marrying Indigenous women. French Canadians associated the coureur des bois with being ungovernable and fearless men. The biggest problem with the coureur des bois was their interference with the missionary effort of the French Canadians. They denounced the French priests and missionaries and undermined their evangelistic efforts by supplying the Indigenous peoples with liquor. The coureur des bois refusal to submit to the will of the missionaries made them an enemy. This resulted in the coureur des bois being labelled as unruly and a threat to colonial survival. The coureurs des bois were renowned for their ability to trap animals for the fur trade but their overall reputation was negative for French Canadians. A late 17th century French officer described them as follows:

These canoes had been a year and eighteen months out. You would be amazed to see how lewd these coureurs des bois are when they return, how they feast and game, and how prodigal they are, not only in their clothes but upon women. Such of them as are married have the wisdom to retire to their own houses; but the bachelors act just as our East-India-Men and pirates are wont to do; for they lavish, eat, drink, and play all away as long as the goods hold out; and when these are gone, they even sell their embroidery, their lace, and their clothes. This done, they are forced to go upon a new voyage for subsistence,

The coureurs des bois are often confused with voyagers however the two groups had very different reputations. The coureurs des bois were considered outlaws because of their lack of licences to participate in the fur trade. The requirement of licences to participate in trapping and trading furs limited the types of people who could participate in the lucrative trade. Trapping and trading without one of the required licences was a legally punishable offence. The coureurs des bois were seen by the French government and French citizens as problematic because they did not abide by the licensing laws. Additionally, the coureurs des bois were seen more frequently as explorers than their voyager counterparts. The voyager's ties to fur companies dictated how and where they trapped, whereas the coureur des bois were free to explore and trap in any place they could find. The coureur des bois freedom and intimate ties to the Indigenous peoples resulted in many French people viewing them as only a step above Native American men.

== Notable examples ==
Most coureurs des bois were primarily or solely fur-trade entrepreneurs and not individually well known. The most prominent coureurs des bois were also explorers and gained fame as such.

- Étienne Brûlé was the first European to see the Great Lakes. He travelled to New France with Samuel de Champlain.
- Jean Nicolet (Nicollet) de Belleborne (Ca. 1598 – 1 November 1642) was a French coureur des bois noted for exploring Green Bay in what is now the U.S. state of Wisconsin. Nicolet was born in Normandy, France in the late 1590s and moved to New France in 1618. In that same year, he was recruited by Samuel de Champlain, who arranged for him to live with a group of Algonquians, designated as the "Nation of the Isle", to learn native languages and later serve as an interpreter. The natives quickly adopted Nicolet as one of their own, even allowing him to attend councils and negotiate treaties. In 1620, Nicolet was sent to make contact with the Nipissing, a group of natives who played an important role in the growing fur trade. After having established a good reputation for himself, Nicolet was sent on an expedition to Green Bay to settle a peace agreement with the natives of that area.
- Médard Chouart des Groseilliers (1618–1696) was a French explorer and fur trader in Canada. In the early 1640s, des Groseilliers relocated to Quebec, and began to work around Huronia with the Jesuit missions in that area. There he learned the skills of a coureur des bois and in 1653 married his second wife, Margueritte. Her brother, Pierre-Esprit Radisson, also became a notable figure in the fur trade and is often mentioned in the same breath as des Groseilliers. Radisson and des Grosseilliers would also travel and trade together, as they did throughout the 1660s and 1670s. Together, they explored west into previously unknown territories in search of trade. Having incurred legal problems in New France because of their trade, the two explorers went to France in an attempt to rectify their legal situation. When this attempt failed, the pair turned to the English. Through this liaison with the English and thanks to their considerable knowledge and experience in the area, the pair are credited with the establishment of the Hudson's Bay Company.
- Pierre-Esprit Radisson (1636–1710) was a French Canadian fur trader and explorer. His life as explorer and trader is crucially intertwined with that of his brother-in-law, Médard des Groseilliers. Radisson came to New France in 1651, settling in Trois-Rivières. That same year, he was captured by the Mohawks while duck hunting. Although two of his companions were killed during this exchange, the natives spared Radisson's life and adopted him. Through this adoption, Radisson learned native languages that would later serve him well as an interpreter. He worked throughout the 1660s and 1670s with his brother-in-law, des Groseilliers, on various trade and exploration voyages into the west of the continent. Much of Radisson's life during this period is wrapped up in the story of des Groseilliers. Together they are credited with the establishment and shaping of the Hudson's Bay Company.
- Daniel Greysolon, Sieur du Lhut (1639–1710) was a French soldier and explorer who is the first European known to have visited the area where the city of Duluth, Minnesota is now located and the headwaters of the Mississippi River near Grand Rapids. In 1678 Du Lhut set out to make peace negotiations with the Sioux, Chippewas, and other tribes near Lake Superior. His negotiations were successful and were sealed by multiple intertribal marriages. Du Lhut's freedom as a courerur des bois allowed him to explore unseen lands. Du Lhut sought permission to continue exploring however he was denied by the French court. Du Lhut's exploration and trapping history could have been as successful as his rival René-Robert Cavelier, Sieur de La Salle if he had been given permission to continue.
- Jacques La Ramee (1784–1821)
- Pierre de La Vérendrye (1685–1749)
- Louis-Joseph de La Vérendrye and his three brothers, the sons of the Vérendrye mentioned above (1717–1761)
- François Baby (1733–1820)
- Jacques Baby (1731–1789)
- Horace Bélanger (1836–1892)
- Jean-Marie Ducharme (1723–1807)
- Dominique Ducharme (1765–1853)
- Luc de la Corne (1711–1784)
- Jacques de Noyon (1668–1745)
- Martin Chartier (1655–1718) accompanied Joliet and LaSalle, became an outlaw, and eventually traded for furs in Tennessee, Ohio and Pennsylvania.
- Peter Bisaillon (1662–1742)
- Jacques Le Tort (1651–1702)
- James Le Tort (1675–1742)

== In literature, television, and film ==
The 1910 Victor Herbert operetta Naughty Marietta featured the male-chorus marching song Tramp Tramp Tramp (Along the Highway), which included the words, "Blazing trails along the byway / Couriers de Bois are we" [sic]. (Some later versions change Rida Johnson Young's lyric to "For men of war are we.")

In James A. Michener's 1974 historical novel Centennial and the 1978–1979 NBC television mini-series of the same name, the colourful, French Canadian or French Metis, coureur des bois, from Montreal, Quebec, Canada, named Pasquinel, was introduced as an early frontier mountain man and trapper, in 1795 Colorado, Spanish Upper Louisiana Territory of Mexico, now the present-day state of Colorado. Pasquinel was portrayed in the miniseries by American TV actor Robert Conrad. The fictional character of Pasquinel was loosely based on the lives of French-speaking fur traders Jacques La Ramee and Ceran St. Vrain.

In a 1990 skit called "Trappers", the Canadian comedy troupe The Kids in the Hall depict two trappers, Jacques (Dave Foley) and François (Kevin McDonald), canoeing through high-rise offices and cubicles to trap businessmen wearing designer Italian suits as a parody of this moment in Canadian colonial history.

The Revenant (2015), directed by Alejandro González Iñárritu, depicts a group of uncharacteristically violent, anti-Indian coureurs des bois in North Dakota, which was contrary to these trappers, who embraced the culture and way of life of Native Americans.

The 2016 television series Frontier chronicles the North American fur trade in late 1700s Canada, and follows Declan Harp, a part-Irish, part-Cree outlaw who is campaigning to breach the Hudson's Bay Company's monopoly on the fur trade in Canada. Several fictional coureurs des bois are featured in this realistic action-drama filmed mostly on location in Newfoundland and Labrador, Nova Scotia, and Ontario, Canada.

== See also ==
- European colonization of the Americas
- Canadian canoe routes
