= Laura Secord Legacy Trail =

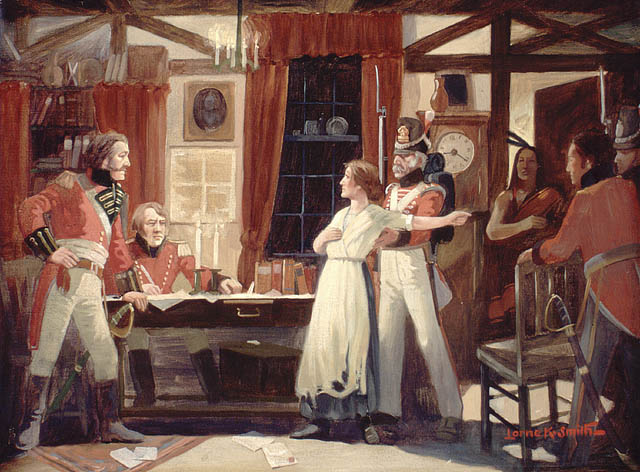
Laura Secord warns James FitzGibbon of an impending American attack, June 1813 during the War of 1812, by Lorne Kidd Smith, ca. 1920, Library and Archives Canada

Laura Secord Legacy Trail is a 32-kilometer (20 mile) trail as a monument to Laura Secord's journey and legacy. It includes the Laura Secord Commemorative Walk that was established in 2013. Secord embarked on a journey in June 1813 during the War of 1812 from the Secord Homestead in Queenston, Niagara-on-the-Lake to deliver a message on 22 June 1813 to Lt. James FitzGibbon at the DeCew House in Thorold, Ontario.

== Secord's journey ==
During the War of 1812, Laura Secord's husband was wounded, yet she left him and their six children to travel to Thorold to spread the word of an impending attack by Americans. She took the journey on 22 June 1813 through the "war-ravaged countryside" to notify Lieutenant James Fitzgibbon of approaching troops from the United States. As a result, British troops and the Kahnawake Mohawk were able to resist the invasion and defeat the Americans during the Battle of Beaver Dams (24 June 1813).

== Trail ==
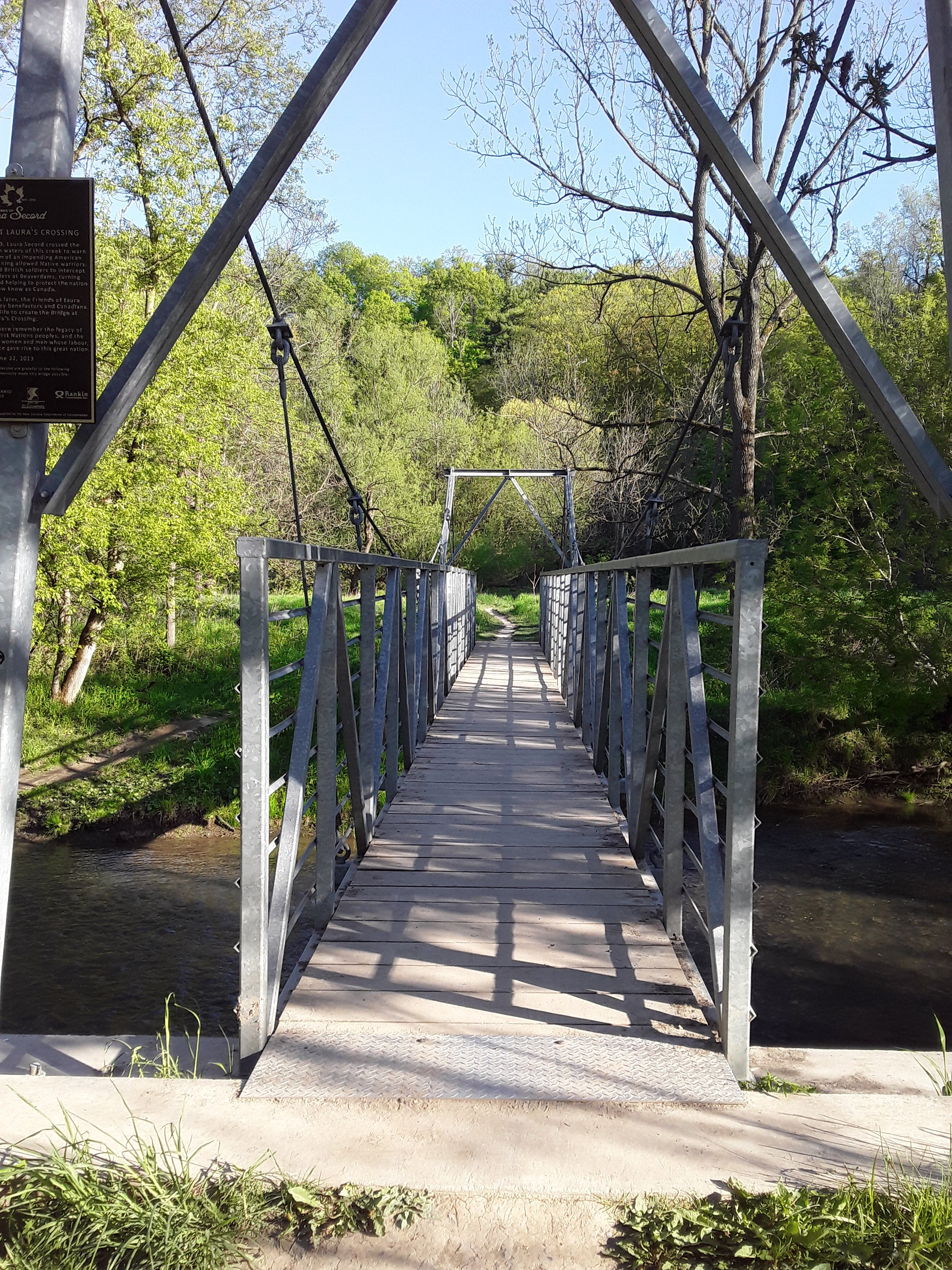
Bridge along the trail named after Secord.

The trail, located along the Trans Canada Trail, can be hiked in five stages along modern sidewalks, footpaths, bridges, and ancient forested trails of Indigenous peoples. A 20–metre pedestrian bridge was built at Twelve Mile Creek and completed by June 22, 2013, the 200-year anniversary of Secord's journey.

Interpretive signs are placed along the trail, which is divided into five stages:

1. Laura Secord Homestead to Firemen's Park
2. Firemen's Park to Niagara College
3. Niagara College to the Marilyn I. Walker Campus of Brock University in St. Catharines
4. Marilyn I Walker Campus to Rotary Park
5. Rotary Park to DeCew House

Caroline McCormick, the three times great granddaughter of Secord, initiated and has been involved in the trail and walk, as well as the Friends of Laura Secord group. She began her efforts in 2010 when she realized that there were no plans to honor Secord in the upcoming bicentennial commemorations of the War of 1812. The trail was reconstructed based upon input from Alun Hughes, a cartographer and historian at Brock University. Students from the geospatial information systems (GIS) program at Niagara College helped create the initial trail map based upon information of Secord's journey supplied by Hughes. A walk is held every June.

The trail overlaps with the Bruce Trail in the eastern part of the trail.

== Mural on Welland Canal Trail ==
Murals along the Welland Canal Trail in Thorold recognize the contributions of Canadians, like Laura Secord. It was created in 2005 by artist Shawn Reimer and volunteers from the community and it is the largest string of murals in the country, totally over 1800 square metres. The mural of Secord depicts her crossing the Twenty Mile Creek, meeting with Native Americans, and informing FitzGibbon of the news. The Welland Trail, a 45 kilometre trail from St Catharines to Port Colborne on Lake Erie, parallels the Welland Canal.
