= Ducharme =

Ducharme is a surname originating from the French language.

Notable people with the surname include:

- Annette Ducharme, Canadian musician and songwriter
- Caroline Ducharme (born 2002), American basketball player
- Denis Ducharme (born 1955), Canadian politician
- Dominique Ducharme (settler) (1765–1853), French Canadian settler and fur trader
- Dominique Ducharme (born 1973), Canadian ice hockey coach and player
- Gerry Ducharme (born 1939), Canadian politician
- Jacques Ducharme (1910–1993), American novelist and historian
- Jean-Marie Ducharme (1723–1807), fur trader and politician
- John Ducharme, American politician
- Moira Leiper Ducharme, Canadian politician
- Paul DuCharme (1917–1985), American basketball player
- Raymond Ducharme Morand (1887–1952), Canadian politician
- Réjean Ducharme (1941–2017), Canadian novelist and playwright
- Richard Ducharme (born 1948), Canadian administrator
- Romulus Ducharme (1886–1976), Canadian politician
- Severin Ducharme (1866–19??), Canadian politician
- Theresa Ducharme (1945–2004), Canadian activist
- Todd Ducharme, Canadian judge
- Yvan Ducharme (1937–2013), Canadian actor
- Yves Ducharme (born 1958), Canadian politician
