= Laura Secord =

Canadian heroine of the War of 1812

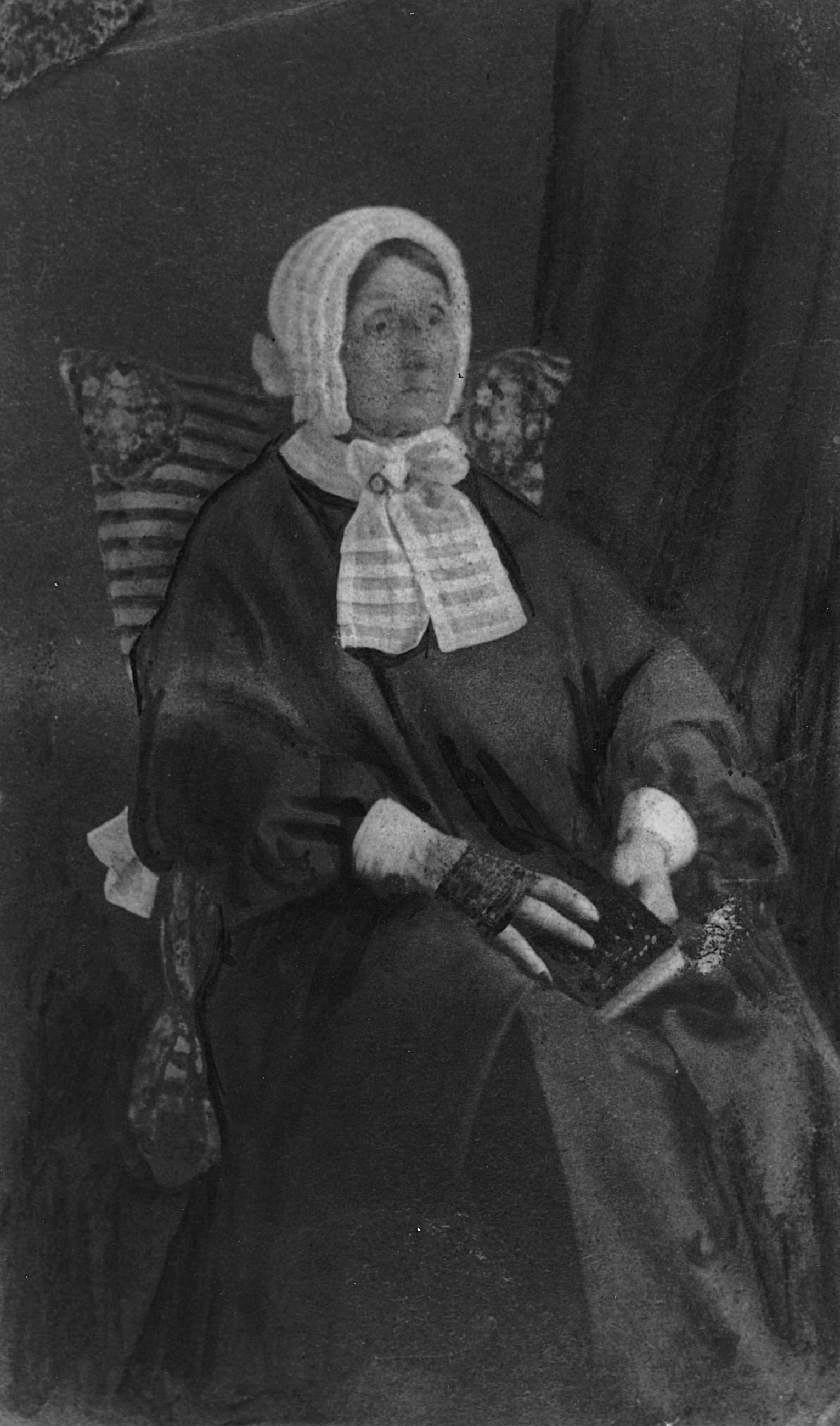
- Secord in 1865
- Born: Laura Ingersoll; 13 September 1775; Great Barrington, Province of Massachusetts Bay
- Died: 17 October 1868 (aged 93); Chippawa, Ontario, Canada
- Citizenship: Canadian
- Known for: War of 1812 heroine
- Spouse: James Secord (m. 1797; died 1841)
- Children: 7

Laura Secord (née Ingersoll; 13 September 1775 – 17 October 1868) was a Canadian woman involved in the War of 1812. She is known for having walked 20 miles (32 km) out of American-occupied territory in 1813 to warn British forces of an impending American attack. Her contribution to the war was little known during her lifetime, but since her death she has been frequently honoured in Canada. Though Laura Secord had no relation to it, most Canadians associate her with the Laura Secord Chocolates company, named after her on the centennial of her walk.

Laura Secord's father, Thomas Ingersoll, lived in Massachusetts and fought on the side of the Patriots during the Revolutionary War (1775–1783). In 1795 he moved his family to the Niagara region of Upper Canada after he had applied for and received a land grant. Shortly after, Laura married Loyalist James Secord, who was later seriously wounded at the Battle of Queenston Heights early in the War of 1812. While he was still recovering in 1813, the Americans invaded the Niagara Peninsula, including Queenston. During the occupation, Secord acquired information about a planned American attack, and stole away on the morning of 22 June to inform Lieutenant James FitzGibbon in the territory still controlled by the British. The information helped the British and their Mohawk allies repel the invading Americans at the Battle of Beaver Dams. Her effort was forgotten until 1860, when Edward, Prince of Wales, awarded the impoverished widow £100 (£13,000 in 2022) for her service on his visit to Canada.

The story of Laura Secord has taken on mythic overtones in Canada. Her tale has been the subject of books, plays, and poetry, often with many embellishments. Since her death, Canada has bestowed honours on her, including schools named after her, monuments, a museum, a memorial stamp and coin, and a statue at the Valiants Memorial in the Canadian capital.

== Personal history ==
=== Family history and early life ===
Laura's father, Thomas Ingersoll, married seventeen-year-old Elizabeth Dewey on 28 February 1775 in Great Barrington, Massachusetts. Their first child, Laura, was born there on 13 September 1775. Thomas, son of Jonathan Ingersoll, was born in 1749 in Westfield, Massachusetts. Elizabeth, daughter of Israel Dewey, was also born in Westfield. Thomas moved to Great Barrington in 1774, where he settled into a house on a small piece of land by the Housatonic River. Over the next several years, his success as a hatter allowed him to marry, increase his landholdings, and enlarge his house as his family grew. During the American Revolutionary War, Thomas spent much time away from home as a militia officer serving on the Patriot side. He was commissioned as a second lieutenant in the Massachusetts militia in October 1777 and rose to the rank of captain. When the war was over, Thomas was appointed a magistrate upon his return to Great Barrington. Thomas helped suppress Shays' Rebellion in 1786, which earned him the rank of major.

Elizabeth gave birth to three more girls: Elizabeth Franks on 17 October 1779; Mira (or Myra) in 1781; and Abigail in September 1783. Elizabeth Ingersoll died on 20 February 1784, and Abigail was given up for adoption to Elizabeth's sister Abigail and her husband Daniel Nash. Thomas remarried on 26 May 1785 to Mercy Smith, widow of Josiah Smith. Although Mercy was childless, she has been credited with teaching her stepdaughters to read and do needlework before her death from tuberculosis in 1789.

Thomas remarried four months after Mercy's death, on 20 September 1789, to Sarah "Sally" Backus (née Whiting), a widow with a daughter, Nancy. The couple had an additional four girls and three boys. The first boy, Charles Fortescue, was born on 27 September 1791. Charlotte (born 1793) and Appolonia "Appy" (born 1794) were the last members of this branch of the Ingersoll family to be born in Massachusetts.

In the years after the Revolutionary War, Laura's father witnessed and was offended by the continuing persecution of Loyalists in Massachusetts. Thomas realized that in the depressed economic conditions that followed the war, and with his own deep debts, he was unlikely to see his former prosperity again. In 1793, Thomas met in New York City with Mohawk leader Joseph Brant, who offered to show him the best land for settlement in Upper Canada, where the British Crown was encouraging development. He and four associates travelled to Upper Canada and petitioned Lieutenant Governor John Simcoe for a land grant. They received 66,000 acres (27,000 ha; 103 sq mi) in the Thames River valley, and founded Oxford-on-the-Thames (later known as Ingersoll, Ontario), on condition that they populate it with forty other families within seven years. After winding up his affairs in Great Barrington, Thomas and his family moved to Upper Canada in 1795.

=== Adulthood, marriage and children ===
Thomas Ingersoll supported his family in their early years in Upper Canada by running a tavern in Queenston while land was being cleared and roads built in the settlement. The family stayed in Queenston until a log cabin was completed on the settlement in 1796. After Governor Simcoe returned to England in 1796, opposition grew in Upper Canada to the "Late Loyalists", such as Thomas, who had come to Canada for the land grants. The grants were greatly reduced, and Thomas's contract was cancelled for not having all of its conditions fulfilled. Feeling cheated, in 1805 he moved the family to Credit River, close to York (present-day Toronto), where he successfully ran an inn until his 1812 death following a stroke. Sally continued to run it until her own death in 1833.

Laura Ingersoll remained in Queenston when the family moved. She married merchant James Secord, likely in June 1797. (Note: The exact date has not been determined as the marriage records were destroyed when the town was burned by the Americans in July 1814.) James was the son of James Secord, a Loyalist who had served as a Lieutenant in the British Indian Department during the Revolutionary War. The couple lived in a house built in St. Davids, the first floor of which was a shop. Secord gave birth to her first child, Mary, in St. Davids in 1799. Mary was followed by Charlotte (1801), Harriet (10 February 1803), Charles Badeau (1809 – the only male child) and Appolonia (1810).

=== Battle of Queenston Heights ===
When the United States declared war against Britain in June 1812, James enlisted in the 1st Lincoln Regiment of Militia as a sergeant. He had previously been a captain in the 1st Lincoln but had resigned his commission before 1812. James was attached to Issac Swayze's troop of Provincial Royal Artillery Drivers, also known as the "Car Brigade." This militia unit was responsible for moving field guns and ammunition during military engagements.

On October 13, 1812, the Americans crossed the Niagara River and landed near Queenston. Laura and her five children took shelter in a farmhouse about a mile inland, while James mustered with the militia. During the ensuing Battle of Queenston Heights, James was shot twice, once in the shoulder and once in the knee. When the guns fell silent, Laura returned to the village to discover that American soldiers had ransacked her house. She received word that James had been wounded and headed for the battlefield. With "the assistance of a gentleman" Laura brought James to their home and treated his injuries. Once James was well enough to be moved, Laura took her husband and children to St. Davids where they spent the winter living with James's relatives.

An early biographer of Laura Secord, Emma A. Currie, related a story, attributed to James and Laura's grandson, that Laura encountered three American soldiers intending to club her wounded husband to death with their muskets. An American officer, Captain John E. Wool, intervened, sent the three back across the river under guard, and ordered his men to carry James to his house in Queenston. This story has been dismissed by later biographers as the Americans had surrendered well before Laura arrived on the battlefield, while Captain Wool had been ordered back across the river hours earlier to have his wounds treated.

=== Secord's walk ===
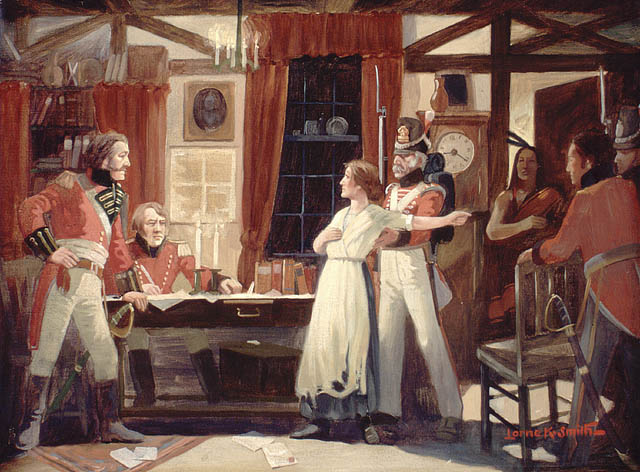
Secord warns British commander James FitzGibbon of an impending American attack at Beaver Dams. (Lorne Kidd Smith, c. 1920)

On 27 May 1813, the American army launched an attack across the Niagara River, and captured Fort George. Queenston and the Niagara area fell to the Americans. Men of military age were sent as prisoners to the U.S., though the still-recuperating James Secord was not among them. That June, a number of U.S. soldiers were billeted at the Secords' home.

On the evening of 21 June 1813, Laura Secord heard of plans for a surprise American attack on Lieutenant James FitzGibbon's British troops at Beaver Dams, which would have furthered American control in the Niagara Peninsula. It is unclear how she became aware of these plans. According to tradition she overheard a conversation among the billeted Americans as they ate dinner.

As her husband was still recovering from his October injuries, Secord set out early the next morning to warn the lieutenant. She reportedly walked 20 miles (32 km) from present-day Queenston through St. Davids, (Note: While in St. Davids, Secord stopped at the home of her half-brother Charles, who was ill in bed.) Homer, Shipman's Corners and Short Hills at the Niagara Escarpment before she arrived at the camp of allied Mohawk warriors, who led her the rest of the way to FitzGibbon's headquarters at the DeCew House. Based on her warning, a small British force and a larger contingent of Mohawk warriors were readied for the American attack. They defeated the Americans, most of whom were casualties or taken prisoner in the Battle of Beaver Dams on 24 June. No mention of Secord was made in reports that immediately followed the battle.

=== Post-war years ===
After the war, with the Secords' Queenston store in ruins, the family was impoverished. Only James's small war pension and the rent from 200 acres (81 ha) of land they had in Grantham Township supported them.

The Secords' sixth child, Laura Anne, was born in October 1815, and their last child, Hannah, was born in 1817. The Secords' eldest daughter Mary wedded a doctor, William Trumball, on 18 April 1816. On 27 March 1817, Mary gave birth in Ireland to Elizabeth Trumball, the first of Laura and James's grandchildren. Mary had another daughter, also named Mary, in Jamaica. Following her husband's death, Mary returned to Queenston with her children in 1821.

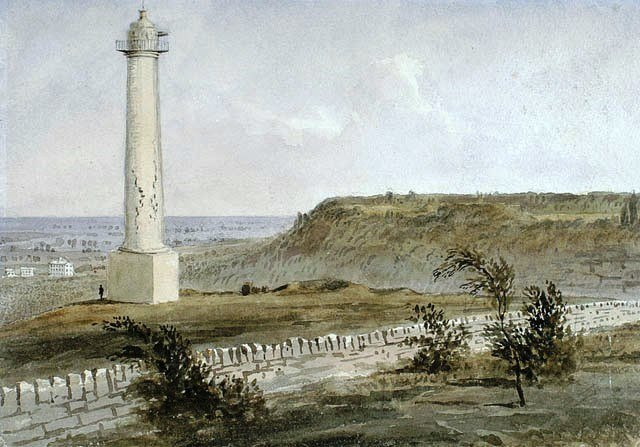
Secord was promised a position at Brock's Monument, but the position was given to another woman. (1840 painting by Philip John Bainbrigge)

The struggling James petitioned the government in 1827 for some sort of employment. Lieutenant-Governor Peregrine Maitland did not offer him a position, but offered something to Laura. He asked her to be in charge of the yet-to-be-completed Brock's Monument. At first, she turned it down, but then reluctantly accepted it. When Brock's Monument opened in 1831, Secord learned the new Lieutenant-Governor, John Colborne, intended to give the keys to the widow of a member of the monument committee who had died in an accident. On 17 July 1831, Secord petitioned Colborne to honour Maitland's promise, and included another certificate from FitzGibbon attesting her contribution to the war. She wrote that Colonel Thomas Clarke had been told by Maitland, "it was too late to think of [the committee member's widow] Mrs. Nichol as I have pledged my word to Mrs. Secord that as soon as possible she should have the key." Despite her pleas, Secord did not receive the keys to the monument.

In 1828, the Secords' daughter, Appolonia, died at 18 of typhus, and James was appointed registrar of the Niagara Surrogate Court. He was promoted to judge in 1833, and his son Charles Badeau Secord took over the registrar position. Charles Badeau Secord's first son, Charles Forsyth Secord, was born 9 May 1833. His is the only line of Secords that survived into the 21st century.

James became a customs collector in 1835 at the port of Chippawa. (Note: Chippawa is now part of Niagara Falls, Ontario.) The position came with a home in Chippawa, into which the family moved. Charles Badeau Secord took over the Queenston home. Daughter Laura Ann and her son moved into the home in 1837 following her husband's death.

=== Later life and death ===
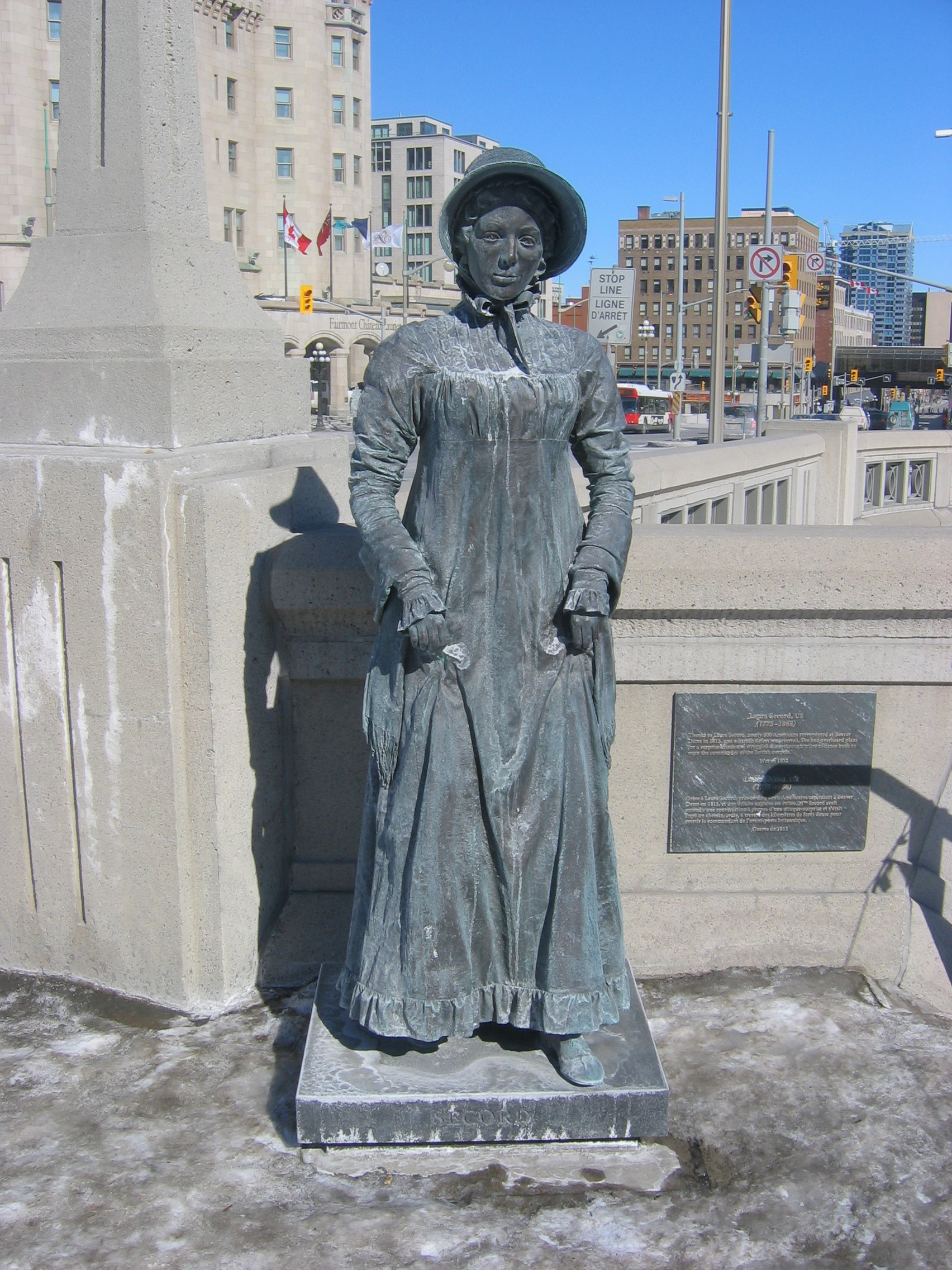
Statue of Laura Secord at the Valiants Memorial in Ottawa

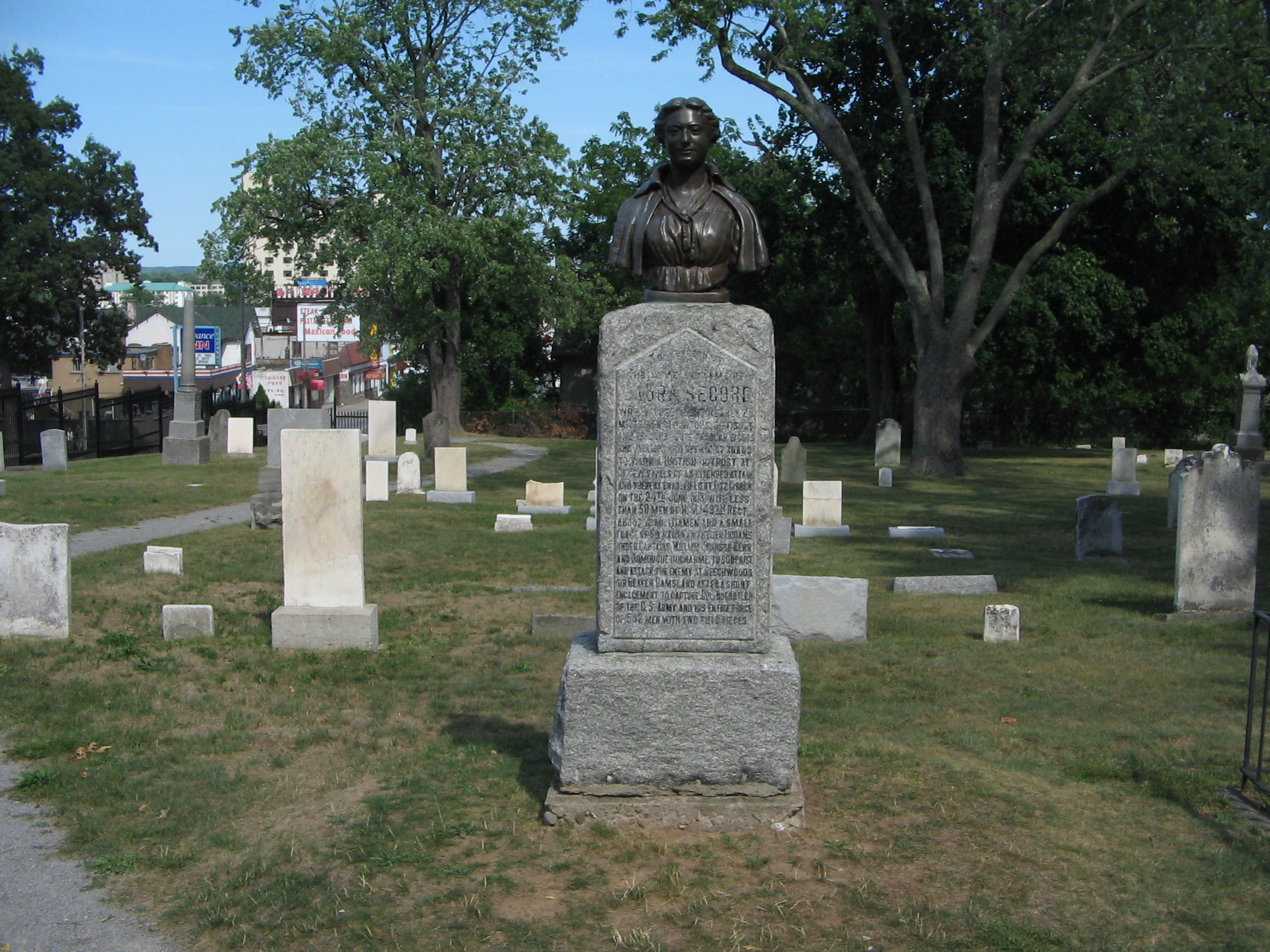
Secord's grave at Drummond Hill Cemetery

James Secord died of a stroke on 22 February 1841. He was buried, according to his wishes, at Drummond Hill (now in Niagara Falls). James's death left Laura destitute. When his war pension ended, she was unable to maintain her land as profitable and sold off much of it. Governor-General Sydenham denied a 27 February 1841 petition which she sent, seeking to have her son to take over James's customs position. Sydenham also denied a petition she sent that May for a pension for herself, as James had received a pension for decades.

Possibly with help from better-off members of the family, Secord moved to a red brick cottage on Water Street (Note: Water Street has since been renamed Bridgewater Street.) in November 1841. Daughter Harriet and her own two daughters joined her in May 1842, after Harriet's husband died of alcohol poisoning. The three shared quarters with Secord for the rest of her life. Youngest daughter Hannah also moved in when she was widowed in 1844, and brought two daughters with her. Though she lacked training, for a short time Laura Secord ran a small school out of the home in an effort to support herself. This venture came to an end when the public common school system was introduced in the 1840s.

Over the years, the Secords unsuccessfully petitioned the government for some kind of acknowledgement. In 1860, when Secord was 85, the Prince of Wales heard of her story while travelling in Canada. At Chippawa, near Niagara Falls, he learned of Laura Secord's plight as an aging widow and sent an award of £100 (equivalent to $10,513 in 2025). It was the only official recognition that she received during her lifetime.

Laura Secord died in 1868 at the age of 93. She was interred next to her husband in the Drummond Hill Cemetery in Niagara Falls. Her grave is marked by a monument with a bust on top, and is close to a monument marking the Battle of Lundy's Lane.

The inscription on her grave marker reads:

To perpetuate the name and fame of Laura Secord, who walked alone nearly 20 miles by a circuitous difficult and perilous route, through woods and swamps and over miry roads to warn a British outpost at DeCew's Falls of an intended attack and thereby enabled Lt. FitzGibbon on 24 June 1813, with fewer than 50 men of the H.M. 49th Regt., about 15 militiamen and a small force of Six Nations and other Indians under Capt. William Johnson Kerr and Dominique Ducharme to surprise and attack the enemy at Beechwoods (or Beaver Dams) and after a short engagement, to capture Col. Bosler of the U.S. Army and his entire force of 542 men with two field pieces.

== Memory and legend ==
External videos
- "Laura Secord" – Historica Canada. - Heritage Minutes (1:01 min)

Her granddaughter described Secord as being 5 feet 4 inches (163 cm) with brown eyes and a fair complexion. James FitzGibbon wrote she was "of slight frame and delicate appearance". She was skilled at needlework, dressmaking and cooking. According to biographer Peggy Dymond Leavey, her many grandchildren enjoyed hearing their grandmother tell stories of her early life, and her Anglican faith increased with age.

In his report of the battle, FitzGibbon stated only that he "received information" about the threat; it is possible he omitted mention of Secord to protect her family during wartime. He first wrote of Secord in a certificate dated 26 February 1820, in support of a petition by her husband for a licence to operate a stone quarry in Queenston. In 1827 FitzGibbon wrote:

I do hereby Certify that on the 22d. day of June 1813, Mrs. Secord, Wife of James Secord, Esqr. then of St. David's, came to me at the Beaver Dam after Sun Set, having come from her house at St. David's by a circuitous route a distance of twelve miles, and informed me that her Husband had learnt from an American officer the preceding night that a Detachment from the American Army then in Fort George would be sent out on the following morning (the 23d.) for the purpose of Surprising and capturing a Detachment of the 49th Regt. then at Beaver Dam under my Command. In Consequence of this information, I placed the Indians under Norton together with my own Detachment in a Situation to intercept the American Detachment and we occupied it during the night of the 22d. – but the Enemy did not come until the morning of the 24th when his Detachment was captured. Colonel Boerstler, their commander, in a conversation with me confirmed fully the information communicated to me by Mrs. Secord and accounted for the attempt not having been made on the 23rd. as at first intended.

— James FitzGibbon, letter dated 11 May 1827

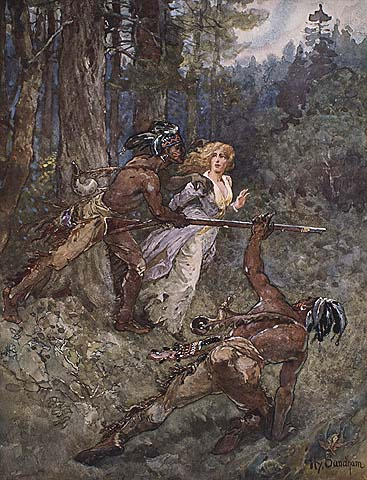
Secord led through the woods by Mohawk warriors. (Henry Sandham, c. 1910)

FitzGibbon wrote in a certificate dated 23 February 1837 that Secord did "acquaint" him with the Americans' intentions, but does not state whether he used the information. A diary entry of Mohawk chief John Norton talks of "a loyal Inhabitant [who] brought information that the Enemy intended to attack", but does not name the "Inhabitant". Dominique Ducharme, leader of the Caughnawaga Mohawk in the Battle of Beaver Dams, made no mention of Secord in his reports, nor of receiving information from either Secord or FitzGibbon about the impending American attack.

Secord wrote two accounts of her walk, the first in 1853, and the second in 1861. Neither account contains details that can be corroborated with military accounts of the battle, such as specific dates or details about troops. Her account changed throughout her life. Historian Pierre Berton noted that she never stated clearly how she learned of the impending attack. She told FitzGibbon that her husband had learned about it from an American officer, but years later told her granddaughter that she had overheard the plans directly from the American soldiers billeted in her home. Berton suggested that Secord's informant could have been an American still residing in the United States, who would have been charged with treason had Secord revealed her source. In the 1860s, as Secord's story gained prominence, historian William Foster Coffin added new details, which included the claim that Laura had brought a cow with her as an excuse to leave her home in case the American patrols questioned her.

A number of historians have questioned Secord's account. W. Stewart Wallace, in his 1932 book, The Story of Laura Secord: A Study in Historical Evidence, concluded her story was mostly myth, and that she played no significant role in the outcome of the Battle of Beaver Dams. Historian George Ingram contended in his 1965 book The Story of Laura Secord Revisited that Secord's debunking had been taken too far. Ruth MacKenzie also burnished Secord's reputation with Laura Secord: The Legend and the Lady in 1971.

The question of Secord's actual contribution to the British success has been contested. In the early 1920s, historians suggested that Native scouts had already informed FitzGibbon of the coming attack well before Secord had arrived on 23 June. Historian Ernest Cruikshank wrote in 1895 that "Scarcely had Mrs Secord concluded her narrative, when [Ducharme's] scouts came in ... they had encountered the advance guard of the enemy." Later, two testimonials were found which FitzGibbon wrote in 1820 and 1827, which supported Secord's claim. FitzGibbon asserted that Laura Secord had arrived on 22 June (not 23 June), and that "in consequence of this information", he had been able to intercept the American troops.

== Legacy ==
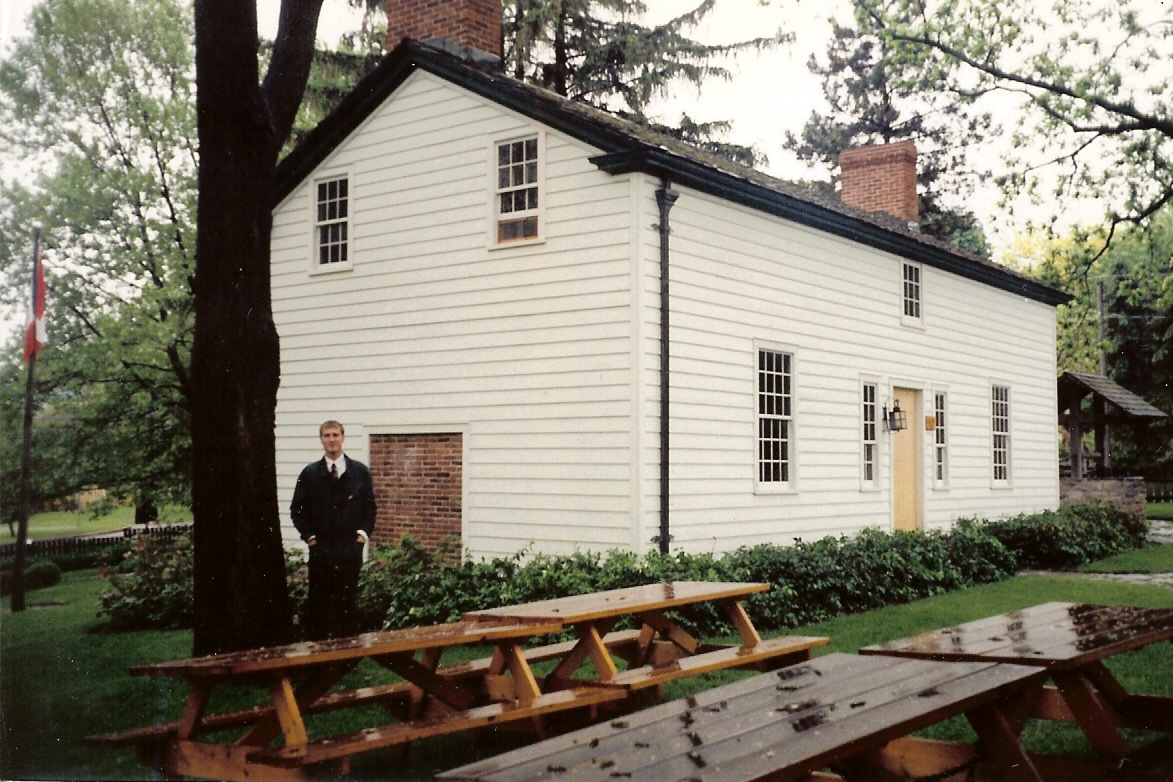
Laura Secord Homestead in Queenston (43.16395°N 79.05523°W)

According to legend, "it took her approximately 17 hours to travel the distance to warn Lieutenant James FitzGibbon of the impending American attack".

She has often been depicted as "a lone figure bravely travelling through approximately 30 km of wilderness from her home at Queenston to a British military detachment camped in DeCew House in what is today Thorold, Ontario."

Historian Cecilia Morgan argues that the Secord story became famous in the 1880s when upper-class women sought to strengthen the emotional ties between Canadian women and the British Empire. She writes that they needed a female heroine to validate their claims for women's suffrage. The first product of their campaign was Sarah Anne Curzon's verse drama Laura Secord: The Heroine of 1812 in 1887. The play was a catalyst for "a deluge of articles and entries on Secord that filled Canadian histories and school textbooks at the turn of the 20th century". Although critics gave the play negative reviews, it was the first full work devoted to Secord's story and popularized her image.

Secord has been compared to French-Canadian heroine Madeleine de Verchères and to American Revolution hero Paul Revere. Her story has been retold and commemorated by generations of biographers, playwrights, poets, novelists and journalists.

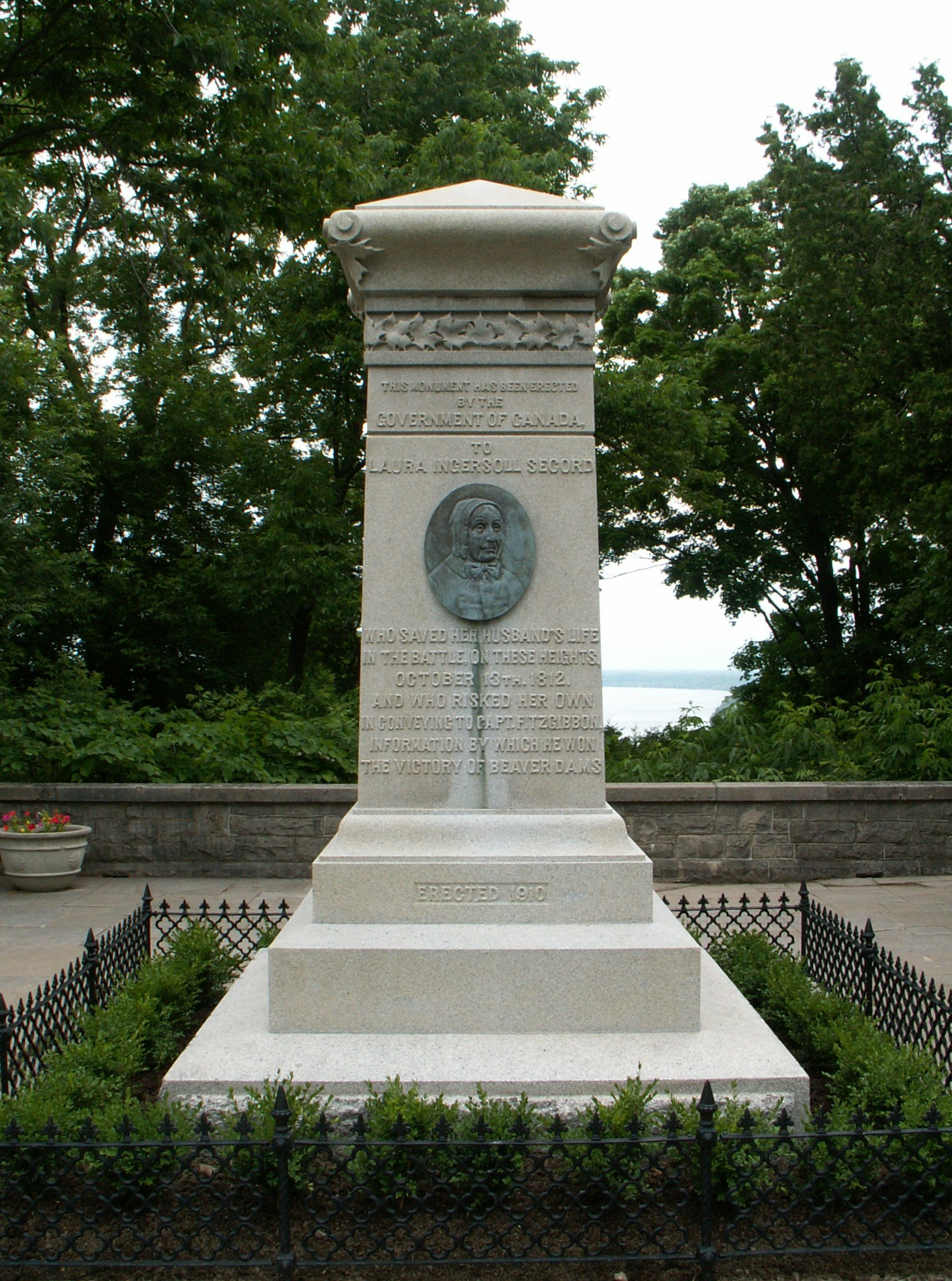
Laura Secord Monument in Queenston Heights (43.160352°N 79.051103°W)

After discovering a newspaper clipping of the events, early feminist Emma Currie began a lifelong interest in Secord's life. She tracked down information from Laura's relatives as far away as Great Barrington, and published a biographical account in 1900 called The Story of Laura Secord. She later successfully petitioned to have a Secord memorial erected in Queenston Heights. The cut stone granite monument stands 7 feet (210 cm) and was dedicated in 1901. In 1905, Secord's portrait was hung in Parliament. Playwright Merrill Denison wrote a radio play of her story in 1931 which mixed serious history with parody.

On the centennial of Secord's walk in 1913, and to capitalize on Canadian patriotic feelings, Frank O'Connor founded Laura Secord Chocolates. The chain's first location opened on Yonge and Elm streets in Toronto. (Note: The chain's first store opened 20 October 1913 at 354 Yonge Street.) The chocolates were packaged in black boxes adorned with a cameo of Secord. By the 1970s, the company had become the largest candy retailer in Canada. Among most Canadians, the name Laura Secord is more strongly associated with the chocolate company than with the historical figure.

During the War of 1812, the Secords' Queenston homestead was fired upon and looted. It was restored in the late 20th century and given to the Niagara Parks Commission in 1971. It is now operated as a museum and gift shop at Partition and Queen streets in Queenston. The Laura Secord Legacy Trail covers the 32 kilometer route of the journey she undertook from her homestead in Queenston to DeCew House in Thorold where she delivered her message to Lt. FitzGibbon on 22 June 1813.

Thomas Ingersoll's old home on Main Street in Great Barrington, Massachusetts, Laura Secord's birthplace, was used as the town's Free Library from 1896 until 1913. The Mason Library replaced it and was built on the site. The Great Barrington Historic District Commission made 18 October 1997 Laura Secord Day, and dedicated a plaque in her honour at the site of the Mason Library.

Laura Secord is the namesake of a number of schools, including Laura Secord Public School (also known as Laura Secord Memorial School, 1914–2010) in Queenston, École Laura Secord School in Winnipeg, Manitoba (built 1912), Laura Secord Secondary School in St. Catharines, Ontario and Laura Secord Elementary School in Vancouver, British Columbia. Beaver Dams Battlefield Park has a plaque dedicated to Secord. In 1992, Canada Post issued a Laura Secord commemorative stamp. In 2003, the Minister of Canadian Heritage declared Secord a "Person of National Historical Significance", and in 2006 Secord's was one of fourteen statues dedicated at the Valiants Memorial in Ottawa. To commemorate the 200th anniversary of her walk, Secord's image adorned a circulation quarter issued by the Royal Canadian Mint (Note: The coin was part of a War of 1812 series.) and a postage stamp from Canada Post.

== See also ==
- Laura Secord Legacy Trail
