= Sarah Anne Curzon =

Canadian writer (1833–1898)

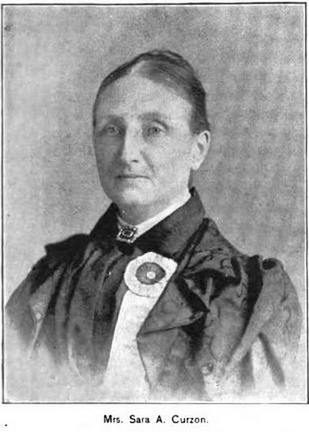
- Curzon, 1897
- Born: Sarah Anne Vincent; 1833; Birmingham, England, United Kingdom
- Died: November 6, 1898 (aged 64–65); Toronto, Ontario, Canada
- Resting place: Mount Pleasant Cemetery, Toronto
- Citizenship: British subject
- Occupation: Writer
- Spouse: Robert Curzon
- Writing career
- Language: English
- Notable work: Laura Secord: The Heroine of 1812

Sarah Anne Curzon born Vincent (1833 – November 6, 1898) was a British-born Canadian poet, journalist, editor, and playwright who was one of "the first women's rights activists and supporters of liberal feminism" in Canada. During her lifetime, she was best known for her closet drama, Laura Secord: The Heroine of 1812, "one of the works that made Laura Secord a household name".

== Life ==
Curzon was born Sarah Anne Vincent in Birmingham, England, the daughter of George Philips Vincent, a wealthy glass manufacturer, and his wife. As a girl she was educated by tutors and at private girls' schools, and contributed prose and verse to English magazines, notably London's Leisure Hour.

She married Robert Curzon in 1858, and the couple came to Canada between 1862 and 1864. Sarah Anne Curzon was a lifelong feminist. She was a founding member in November 1876 of the Toronto Women's Literary Club, which was based on the model of the American Society for the Advancement of Women. The club, whose founders also included Emily Stowe, "focused on advancing women’s rights, as well as literacy". Also in 1876, Curzon wrote what she called "Canada's first feminist play", the historical drama Laura Secord, but she could not get it published until 1887.

Curzon published "verse, essays, and fiction [in] the Canadian Monthly, the Dominion Illustrated, Grip, The Week, Evangelical Churchman, and the Canadian Magazine. She also published women's-suffrage articles in British and American newspapers." She was "a pioneer in educating readers ... about female suffrage, property rights equal to men and access to higher education for women." She was a founding member of the Toronto Suffrage Association and its successor, the Dominion Women’s Enfranchisement Association, for which she also served as the recording secretary. In 1881 she became the associate editor of the Canada Citizen, Canada's first prohibitionist paper, where she wrote a regular column on women's issues. The Canada Citizen boasted the first women's page to cover the issues of women's suffrage and access to postsecondary education.

In 1882, Curzon wrote a closet drama in blank verse, The Sweet Girl Graduate, which "mocked the idea that women were not intelligent enough to study at the university level. The one-act vignette was solicited by John Wilson Bengough, editor of the satirical magazine Grip, and printed in its first annual The Grip-Sack. It deals with a woman who poses as a man to get a higher education, and graduates with top honors. It may have inspired the attempt by Emma Stanton Mellish six months later to enroll in Trinity College under a male name. It likely helped provoke the provincial Order in Council of October 2, 1884, that admitted women to University College.

Curzon supported the efforts of Dr. Emily Stowe to found the Women’s Medical College in Toronto (now Women's College Hospital), which opened in 1883.

Curzon suffered from Bright's Disease, and in 1884 she had to leave her position at The Canada Citizen due to complications related to the disease.

=== Laura Secord ===
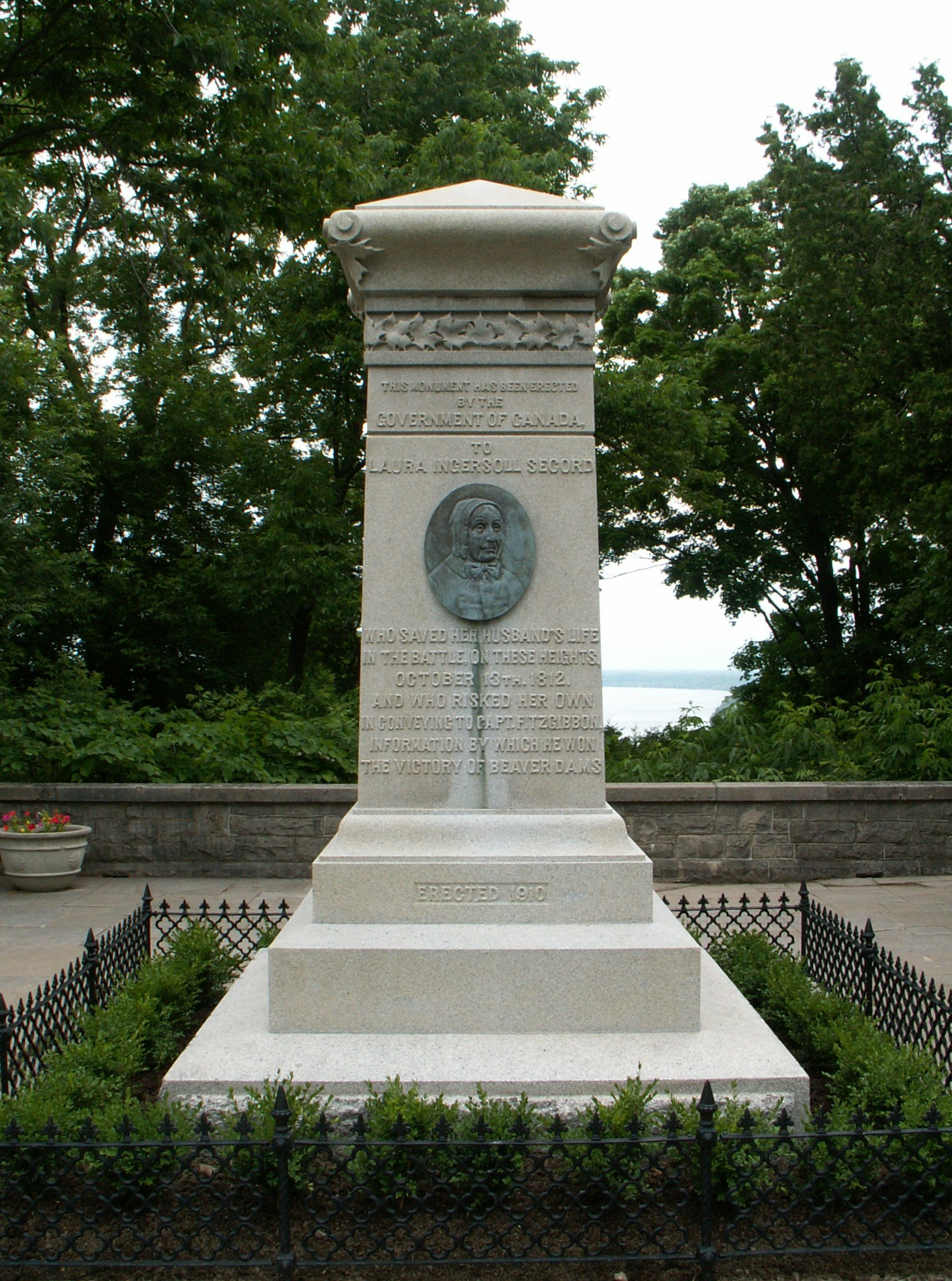
Laura Secord monument on Queenston Heights. Photo by Dickbauch.

Curzon's verse drama, Laura Secord, the heroine of 1812, a tribute to Laura Secord's heroism in the War of 1812, was published in 1887. According to its preface, the play was written to solicit recognition for Laura Secord's contribution to the victory of the Battle of Beaver Dams: "to rescue from oblivion the name of a brave woman, and set it in its proper place among the heroes of Canadian history." The preface called for a fundraising campaign to build a monument to Secord. It was also an intervention into the debate over pensioning the veterans of that war.

The Week called Laura Secord "a dramatic poem of much strength” and praised "Mrs. Curzon’s conscientious researches, and her efforts in providing something for her Canadian public which shall possess a lasting and tangible value". William Douw Lighthall praised Laura Secord as “a sound true book” and dubbed Curzon "the Loyalist Poetess". The play sparked tremendous interest in its subject, causing "a deluge of articles and entries on Secord that filled Canadian histories and school textbooks at the turn of the 20th century".

In 1895, Curzon co-founded the Women’s Canadian Historical Society in Toronto with feminist Mary Anne Fitzgibbon, Lady Matilda Edgar, and others. Curzon was elected the society's first president. She was also an honorary member of the Lundy’s Lane Historical Association, the York Pioneer and Historical Society, and the Women’s Art Association of Canada.

Sarah Anne Curzon's daughter was one of the first females to receive a B.A. degree from the University of Toronto.

Curzon's correspondence indicates that her husband died in 1894. She died in 1898, in Toronto, from Bright's Disease. She is buried in Toronto's Mount Pleasant Cemetery.

== Publications ==
- The Sweet Girl Graduate. Grip-Sack (Toronto) 1, 1882 (republished in Laura Secord and Other Poems).
- Laura Secord, the Heroine of 1812: A Drama, and Other Poems. Toronto: C. Blackett Robinson, 1887. Welland, ON: Lundy's Lane Historical Society, 1898.
- Canada in Memoriam 1812-1814. Welland, ON: Telegraph Steam Printing House, 1891.
- "The Battle of Queenston Heights, Oct. 13, 1812", Women's Canadian Hist. Soc. of Toronto, Trans., no. 2 (1899): 5–12.
