= Lorne Kidd Smith =

Canadian artist (born)

- Born: 1880; Niagara Falls, Ontario
- Died: c. 1966
- Known for: painter

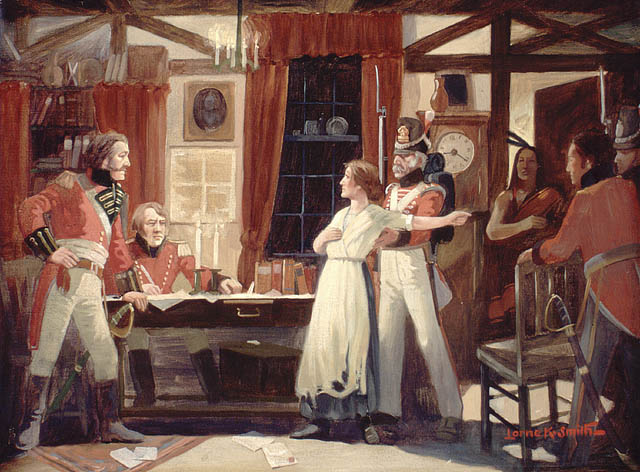
Oil painting by Lorne Kidd Smith, c. 1920, featuring Laura Secord and Lieutenant James Fitzgibbon

Lorne Kidd Smith (1880 – c. 1966) was a Canadian painter best known for his scenes from the War of 1812. He lived and worked in Ontario for most of his life.

Smith was born in Niagara Falls, Ontario in 1880. He studied art in Boston in his early 20s and worked for the Forbes Lithographing Company. He relocated to Toronto in 1909, and worked for Stone Limited and Brigdens Limited, as a staff artist for R.G. McLean and Grip Limited, for the art department at General Motors (1917), and as an artist for Photo Engravers Limited (1937). He was a member of the Canadian Society of Graphic Art. He designed a poster for the First World War-era Victory Loan campaign, for which he won a prize. He became an artist for Schaeffer-Ross, eventually becoming vice-president before his death.

Smith's best-known paintings are "The Meeting of Brock and Tecumseh" and "Laura Secord Warning Colonel Fitzgibbon, June 1813", both of which are now in the collection of Library and Archives Canada. Both are oil paintings depicting scenes of the Canadian/British forces in the War of 1812. They were likely commissioned by Dr. Arthur Doughty, the Dominion archivist, in the early 20th century. "Laura Secord Warning Colonel Fitzgibbon, June 1813" depicts the legend of Laura Secord warning the British army of impending American attack; it was probably painted around 1920. "The Meeting of Brock and Tecumseh" reflected the alliance between British forces under General Isaac Brock and First Nations groups under Tecumseh; it was painted at some point prior to 1931.
