= Battle of Beaver Dams =

1813 battle of the War of 1812

- Part of the War of 1812
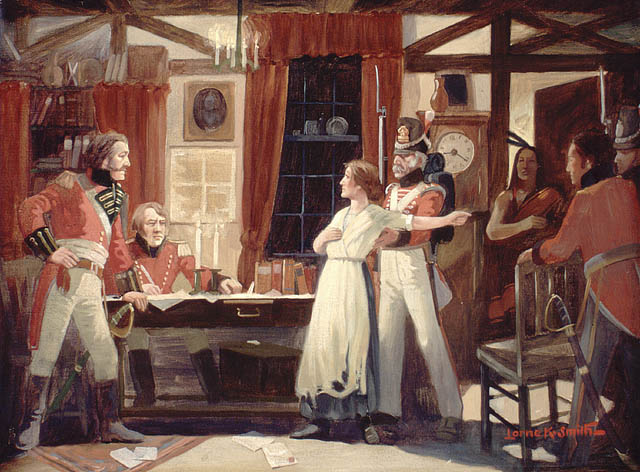
- Laura Secord warns James FitzGibbon.
Date	24 June 1813
Location	Thorold, Ontario 43°07′03.3″N 79°11′07.4″W
Result	British/First nations victory

Belligerents
First Nations: United Kingdom; Upper Canada	United States

Commanders and leaders
James FitzGibbon	Charles G. Boerstler (WIA)

Strength
400 Indigenous Warriors, 50 regulars	600+ regulars

Casualties and losses
5–15 killed 20–25 wounded	25 killed 50 wounded prisoners 462 captured

National Historic Site of Canada
- Official name: Battle of Beaver Dams National Historic Site
- Designated: 1921
- Location within Regional Municipality of Niagara

The Battle of Beaver Dams took place on 24 June 1813, during the War of 1812. A column of troops from the United States Army marched from Fort George and attempted to surprise a British outpost at Beaver Dams, billeting themselves overnight in the village of Queenston, Ontario. Laura Secord, a resident of Queenston, had earlier learned of the American plans from several Americans billeted at her house and had struck out on a long and difficult trek to warn the British at Decou's stone house near present-day Brock University. When the Americans resumed their march, they were ambushed by Kahnawake and other native warriors and eventually surrendered to a small British detachment led by Lieutenant James FitzGibbon. About 500 U.S. troops, including their wounded commander, were taken prisoner.

== Background ==
On 25 May 1813, the United States had won the Battle of Fort George, capturing the fort. The British fell back to a position at Burlington Heights near the western end of Lake Ontario, briefly abandoning the entire Niagara Peninsula to the invading force. The Americans attempted to pursue the British, but their advance was checked at the Battle of Stoney Creek by a British counter-attack. At the same time, the flotilla of warships of the United States Navy which had been supporting their army on the Niagara Peninsula was hastily withdrawn to face a threat to their own base, and a British flotilla threatened the American line of communications. The Americans fell back to Fort George. The British followed up and established an outpost at DeCou's house in the present-day city of Thorold, Ontario, from which natives and militia harassed the U.S. outposts.

The U.S. Army commander at Fort George, Brigadier General John Parker Boyd, decided to clear the threat posed by enemy raiders and to restore his men's morale by making a surprise attack on the outpost at DeCou's.

== U.S. plan ==
The force assigned to the attack was led by the recently promoted Colonel Charles Boerstler of the 14th U.S. Infantry and consisted of Boerstler's own 14th U.S. Regiment of Infantry, with detachments of the 6th, 13th and 23rd U.S. Regiments of Infantry, a company of artillery with one 12-pounder and one 6-pounder field guns, and twenty U.S. Dragoons. An irregular corps of forty mounted volunteers from the New York Militia under Cyrenius Chapin led the way. The force was accompanied by two large supply wagons. At dusk on 23 June, Boerstler's force moved in secret from Fort George to the village of Queenston, where they quartered themselves in the houses and other buildings.

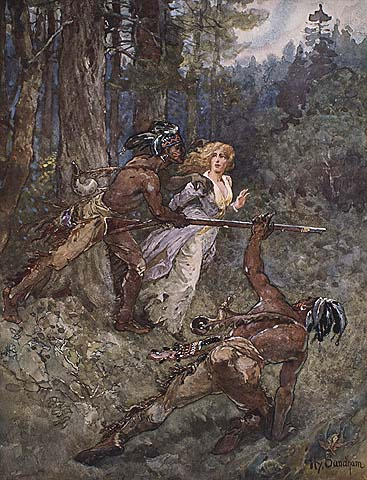
Laura Secord escorted to the British outpost by Mohawk warriors.

Several American officers had earlier billeted themselves in the house of Canadian Militia Captain James Secord, who had been severely wounded the previous year at the Battle of Queenston Heights. His wife, Laura Secord, overheard the officers discussing their scheme. Very early on 22 June, she set out to warn the British at DeCou's house, walking about 17 miles (27 km) through the woods until she came upon a native encampment on the Twelve Mile Creek. The warriors took her to Lieutenant James FitzGibbon, who commanded the British outpost. The information she conveyed to FitzGibbon confirmed what natives had reported since they first observed the U.S. column near St. David's.

== Battle ==
The main contingent of natives were 300 Kahnawake, also referred to as Caughnawaga in contemporary accounts, Mohawk people who had earlier been converted to Christianity by Jesuit missionaries. They were commanded by Captain Dominique Ducharme of the Indian Department, with Lieutenants Isaac LeClair and J.B. de Lorimier. There were also 100 Mohawks under Captain William Johnson Kerr. They set up ambushes in a thickly wooded area 1.5 miles (2.4 km) east of Beaver Dams. FitzGibbon with 46 men of the 49th Regiment of Foot was in reserve.

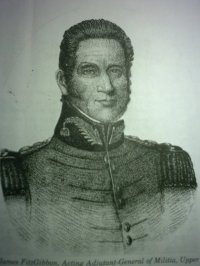
Lt. James FitzGibbon led 46 regulars of the 49th Regiment of Foot during the battle.

Early on 24 June, U.S. forces set out for DeCou's stone house. At St. David's they proceeded along a trail at the base of the escarpment until they reached another trail leading up the "mountain". Reaching the top, they became aware of natives closing in on their flanks and rear, but Boerstler did not change his plans. When the natives opened fire, Boerstler was wounded and placed in one of the wagons. According to U.S. accounts, they caused the Mohawks to flee and fought their way out of the woods into open fields where they could use their artillery, and the natives were not at such an advantage. This account is not supported by other witnesses.

At this point, FitzGibbon intervened. Addressing Boerstler under a flag of truce, he claimed that the Americans were outnumbered and surrounded, and that if they did not surrender he would be unable to restrain the natives from slaughtering them. The wounded Boerstler capitulated to Major de Haren of the Canadian Regiment of Fencible Infantry, who had just arrived on the field with another detachment of British regulars (mainly from the 104th Regiment) from Twelve Mile Creek.

The U.S. force surrendered in a field just south of the Thorold Tunnel, east of the present-day Welland Canal. The prisoners were escorted first to DeCou's, then to the British base at Ball's Falls..

== Casualties ==
The natives admitted to a total of five chiefs and warriors killed, and 20 wounded, although Ducharme stated that 15 were killed and 25 wounded.

The U.S. casualty report stated 25 killed and 50 wounded; all of the wounded being among the prisoners, who numbered 23 officers and 489 enlisted men. It was later claimed that many of the wounded U.S. troops were killed by Mohawks.

== Results ==
Needing to inform headquarters of the victory, a local girl [Sarah Ryan] was platooned to carry news to Burlington Heights by horse. Presuming a 12-year-old would seem less likely to be carrying military intelligence, she hid the dispatches in her dress.

The loss of Boerstler's detachment demoralized the U.S. force at Fort George. From then until they abandoned the fort on 10 December, they rarely dared to send any patrols more than a mile from the fort. To reinforce their fear of the Native people, there was another minor disaster on 8 July when a party from the 8th (King's) Regiment and Merritt's Troop of Provincial Dragoons, accompanied by Ottawas under Captain Matthew Elliott and other Indigenous warriors under Mohawk chief John Norton, went to retrieve a chest of medicines which had been hastily buried at Ball's Farm near Two Mile Creek when the British had evacuated Fort George in May. A party from the 13th U.S. Infantry under Lieutenant Joseph Eldridge attempted to pursue the British detachment but was ambushed at the Battle of Ball's Farm, losing 28 men, several of whom were scalped despite the efforts of officers of the Indian Department to prevent it.

== Legends and folk tales ==
Referring to the respective parts played by the various Native Americans and the British, local legend (perhaps started by Mohawk leader John Norton, who was present) had it that, "The Caughnawaga got the victory, the Mohawks got the plunder and FitzGibbon got the credit".

In 1818, FitzGibbon made a report to Captain Kerr which read in part:

With respect to the affair with Captain [sic] Boerstler, not a shot was fired on our side by any but the Indians. They beat the American detachment into a state of terror, and the only share I claim is taking advantage of a favorable moment to offer them protection from the tomahawk and scalping knife. The Indian Department did the rest.

Captain Ducharme claimed that he himself did not demand the U.S. surrender because as a French Canadian by birth who had spent most of his life among the Indians, he spoke no English.

=== Laura Secord ===
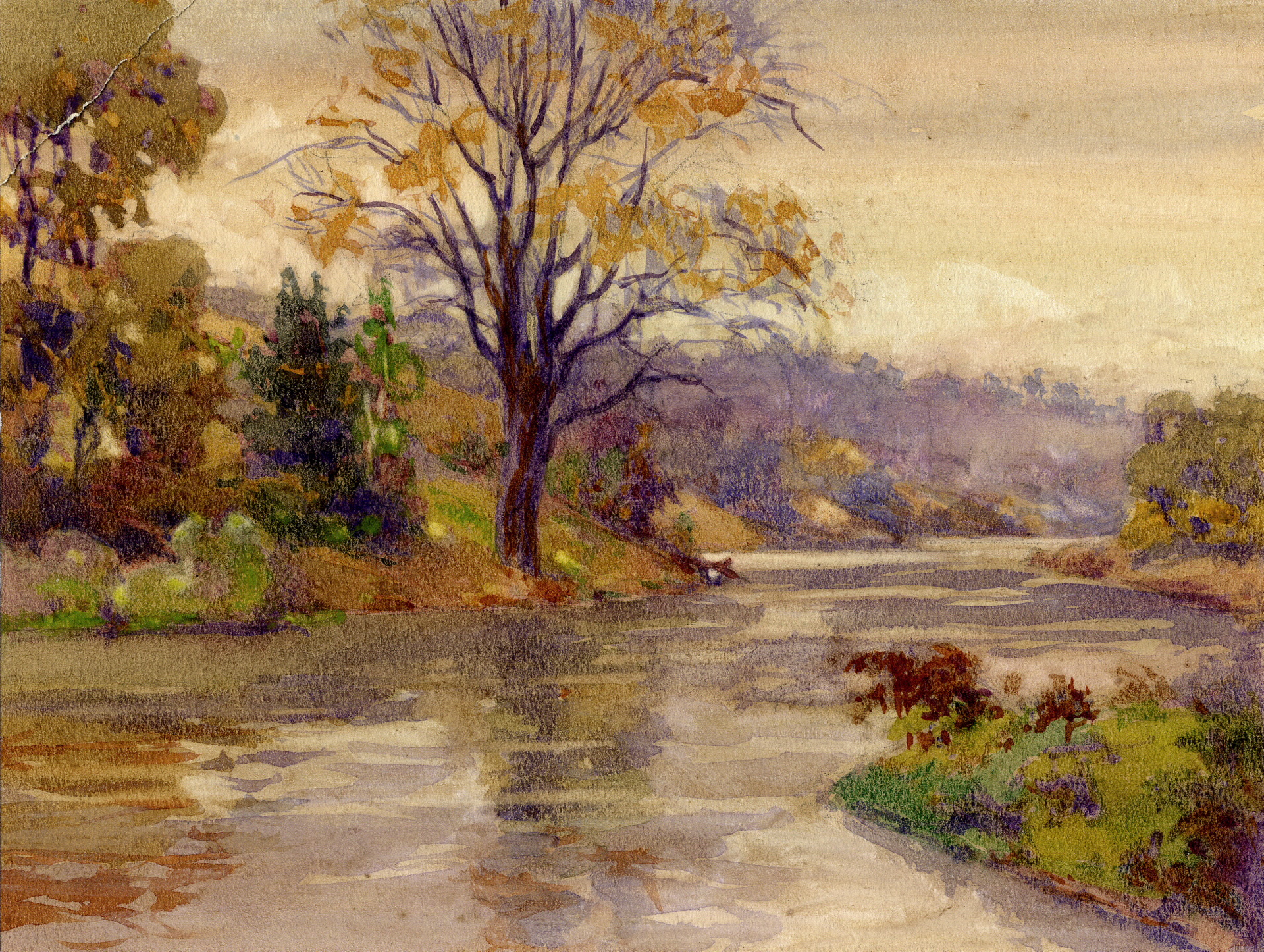
A depiction of where Secord crossed Twelve Mile Creek, in her effort to alert the British detachment on June 23, 1813.

Much later, in 1827, FitzGibbon wrote:

I do hereby Certify that on the 22d. day of June 1813, Mrs. Secord, Wife of James Secord, Esqr. then of St. David's, came to me at the Beaver Dam after Sun Set, having come from her house at St. David's by a circuitous route a distance of twelve miles, and informed me that her Husband had learnt from an American officer the preceding night that a Detachment from the American Army then in Fort George would be sent out on the following morning (the 23d.) for the purpose of Surprising and capturing a Detachment of the 49th Regt. then at Beaver Dam under my Command. In Consequence of this information, I placed the Indians under Norton together with my own Detachment in a Situation to intercept the American Detachment and we occupied it during the night of the 22d. – but the Enemy did not come until the morning of the 24th when his Detachment was captured. Colonel Boerstler, their commander, in a conversation with me confirmed fully the information communicated to me by Mrs. Secord and accounted for the attempt not having been made on the 23rd. as at first intended.

By this account, Laura Secord learned of the U.S. plans and made her exit from St. David's (near Queenston) on June 22, before the main body of U.S. troops had set out from Fort George.

== National Historic Site ==
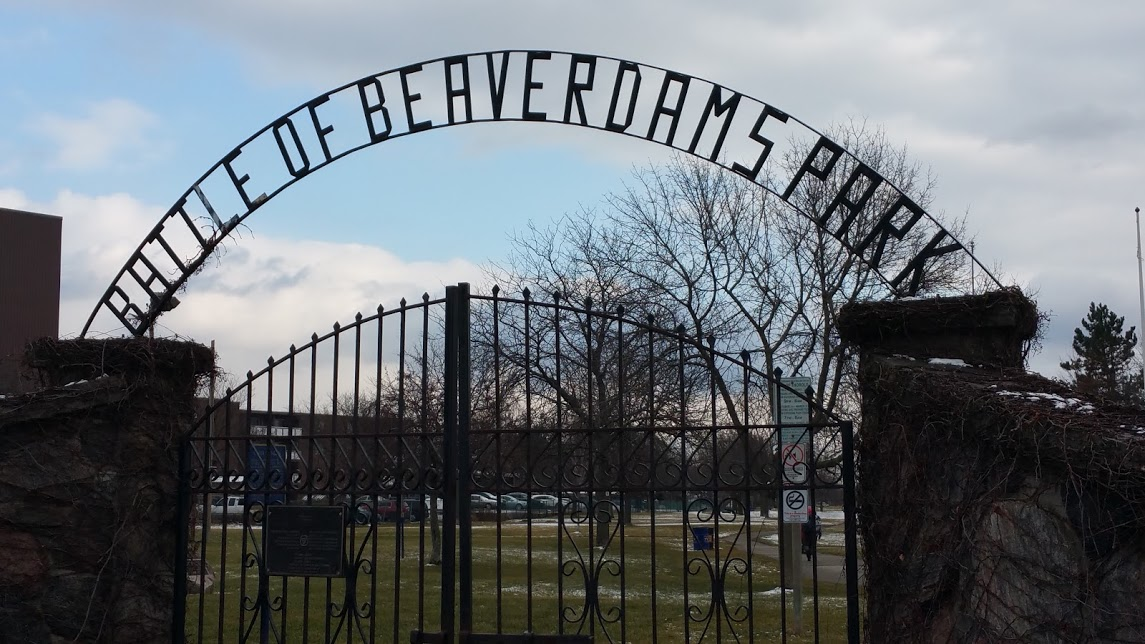
Gate at the entrance to Beaverdams Park Thorold.

- Original site: 43°07′03.3″N 79°11′07.4″W
- Present site: 43°07′21.5″N 79°12′05.1″W

Beaver Dams represents one of the earliest attempts to create a national historical park. In 1914, a convention of Ontario historical and patriotic groups resolved to ask the Department of the Interior "to develop a 40-acre site near Thorold as a national battlefield park commemorating the Battle of Beaver Dams."

Although Beaver Dams was not made a national park, the Historic Sites and Monuments Board was created in 1919 to develop a heritage policy at the federal level for historic sites. In 1921, soon after the Board's formation, the Board recommended the designation of the Battle of Beaver Dams site as a National Historic Site, one of its earliest selections.

A monument commemorating the battle was dedicated in 1923 and situated on the original site of the event (near the southeast corner of the intersection of Davis Road and Old Thorold Stone Road, approximately 1.4 kilometres (0.87 mi) southeast of present-day Thorold), where it was located for several decades. In 1976, this monument (as well as one marking the site where in 1876, during construction of the 3rd Welland Canal, the remains of 16 U.S. soldiers from the battle were uncovered) was subsequently relocated several kilometres to the west when the Battle of Beaverdams [sic] Park was opened and there was talk of constructing a 5th Welland Canal near the battlefield. The original site of the battlefield was unmarked from 1976 until 2013, the Battle of Beaverdams Committee discussed marking the site with a "historic boulder" for the bicentennial and this was achieved on June 23, 2013.

Related to the National Historic Site, the Laura Secord Legacy Trail was dedicated in June 2013, recreating the route of her journey from her homestead in Queenston to DeCew House in Thorold, where she delivered her message to Lt. Fitzgibbon on June 22, 1813. The trail is divided into five stages and encompasses ancient forested Indian trails and modern city sidewalks. The trail is linked to the Trans-Canada Trail and is 32 kilometers.

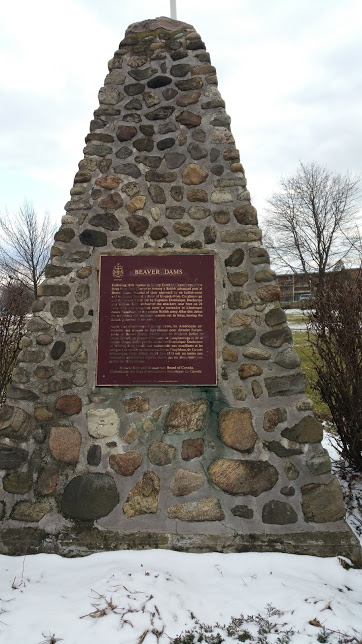
Beaverdams Original Monument now located at Beaverdams Park Thorold

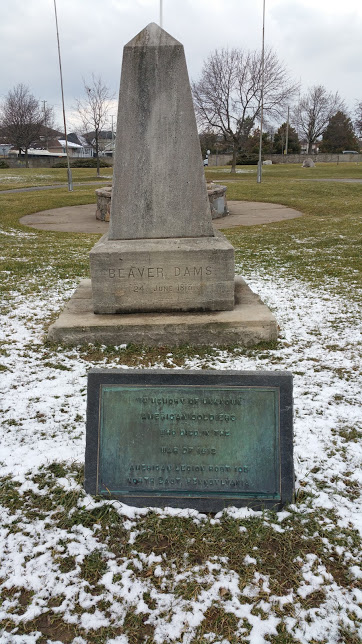
In memory of unknown U.S. soldiers at the Battle of Beaverdams

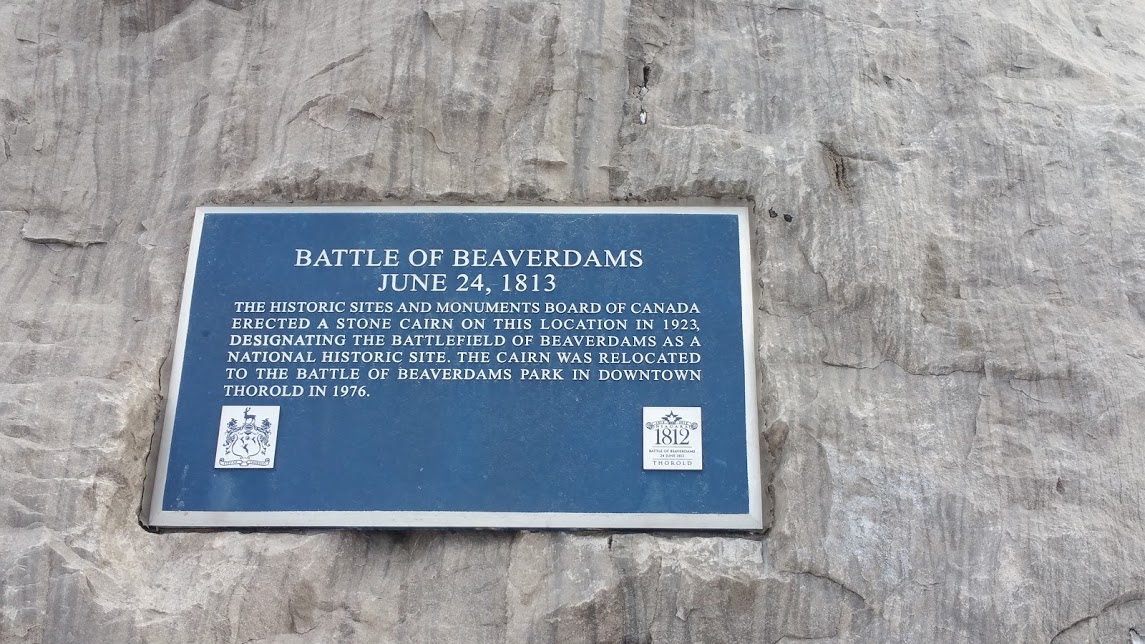
Main Plaque of Battle of Beaverdams Boulder

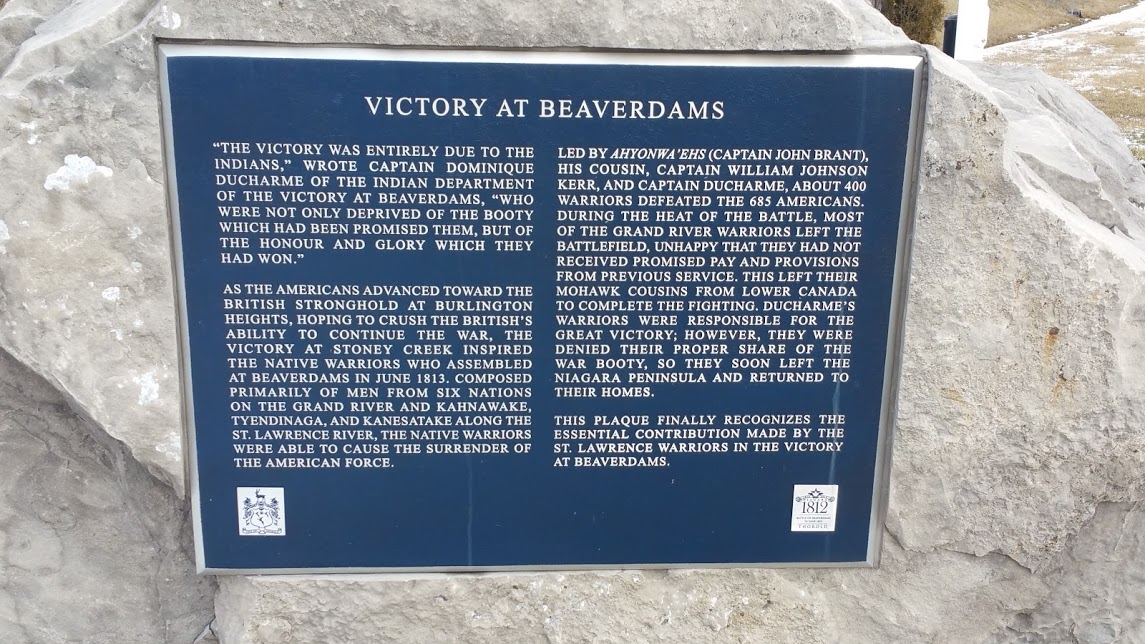
Second side of Battle of Beaverdams Boulder

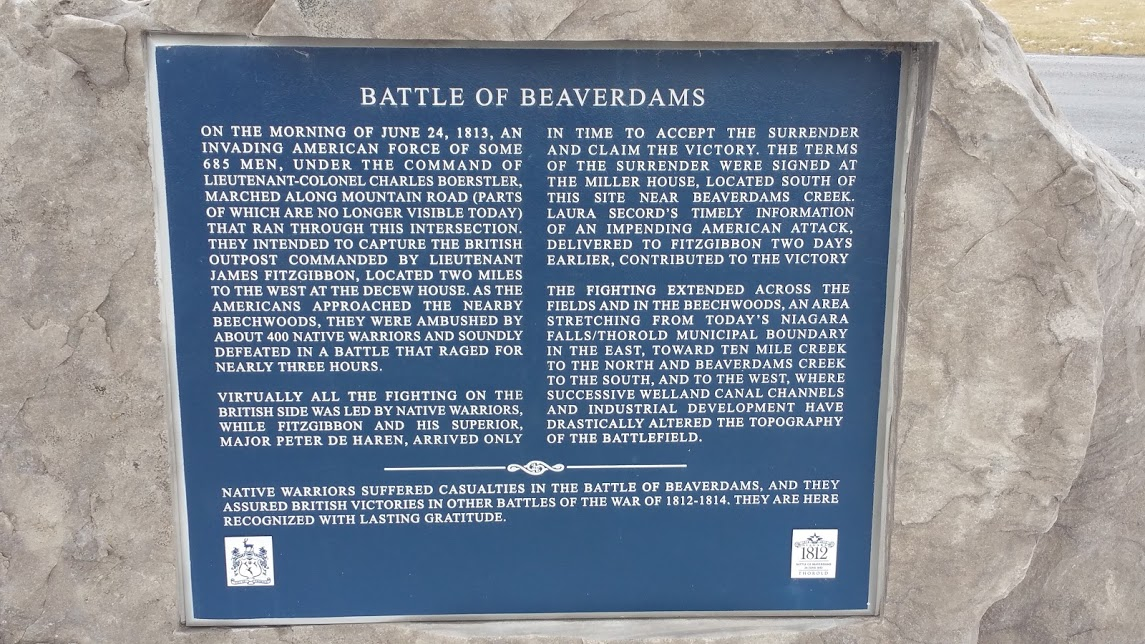
Third Side of Battle of Beaverdams Boulder
