= Jean-Marie Ducharme =

Canadian politician

Jean-Marie Ducharme (French pronunciation: [ʒɑ̃ maʁi dyʃaʁm]; July 19, 1723 – July 20, 1807) was a fur trader and political figure in New France, British Quebec, and Lower Canada.

He was born in Lachine, New France in 1723, the son of a farmer there who also was involved in the fur trade. He entered the fur trade in the southwest. He helped establish the French establish Fort Duquesne near the current site of Pittsburgh. After the British took control of Quebec, Ducharme began operating near what is now Green Bay, Wisconsin, then known as La Baye. In 1763, he transported ammunition to Michilimackinac, contravening a British ban. He was later arrested and imprisoned at Montreal. In 1772, Ducharme was trading with the Little Osages on the Missouri River, leading to an attempt by the Spanish to capture him; his furs were confiscated, but Ducharme managed to escape to Montreal. He continued to trade in the La Baye area.

He was arrested by the British after the American Revolutionary War for selling supplies to the Americans. Ducharme became a partner in a general store set up at Michilimackinac in 1779. During 1779–80, he helped lead a British expedition against the Spanish at St. Louis, in the Anglo-Spanish War. After he retired from the fur trade, Ducharme represented Montreal County in the Legislative Assembly of Lower Canada from 1796 to 1800.

He died at Lachine in 1807. His son Dominique also entered the fur trade and later served with distinction during the War of 1812.
