= James FitzGibbon =

Irish-British army captain in Upper Canada (1780–1863)

Captain James FitzGibbon
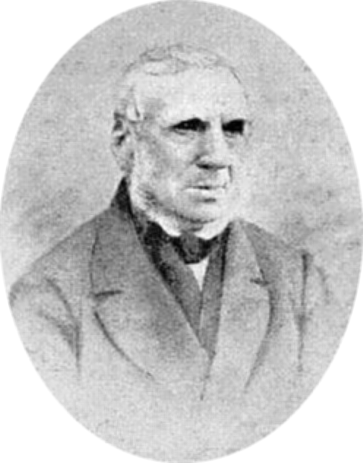
- A portrait of FitzGibbon, likely an engraving
- Born: 16 November 1780; Glin, County Limerick, Ireland
- Died: 10 December 1863 (aged 83); London, England
- Military career
- Allegiance: Great Britain; United Kingdom; Upper Canada
- Branch: British Army; Colonial militia in Canada
- Service years: 1795–1825, 1837
- Rank: Captain
- Conflicts: War of the Second Coalition; Anglo-Russian invasion of Holland; Battle of Alkmaar; Battle of Copenhagen; War of 1812; Battle of Stoney Creek; Battle of Beaver Dams; Raid on Fort Schlosser; Battle of Lundy's Lane; Rebellions of 1837-1838; Upper Canada Rebellion; Battle of Montgomery's Tavern

James FitzGibbon (16 November 1780 – 10 December 1863) was a public servant, prominent freemason of the masonic lodge from 1822 to 1826 (holding the highest position in Upper Canada of deputy provincial grand master), member of the Family Compact, and an Irish soldier in the British Army in Europe before and in the Canadas during the War of 1812 who received messages of warning from two Canadian folk heroes: Laura Secord (Ingersoll) and Billy Green.

James held many titles with Upper Canadian society after the War of 1812, and before the Rebellions of 1837-1838 would be considered a prominent Canadian Tory and a "prime example of government patronage" by William Lyon Mackenzie.

It is noted that the Rebellion of 1837 in Upper Canada brought out "the peak of FitzGibbon's career" and he would be made the acting adjutant-general of militia in Upper Canada, but FitzGibbon would retire the day after the Battle of Montgomery's Tavern, citing "Head's treatment". This "treatment" was likely Head's preferential choosing of Allan MacNab over FitzGibbon first in leading the attack on Montgomery's Tavern.

FitzGibbon would argue in a pamphlet called An appeal to the people of the late province of Upper Canada submitted to the British government in 1847 that he and his actions had "saved Upper Canada for the Empire" during the Rebellions of 1837–1838, but nothing came from it.

FitzGibbon's biography notes him essentially as having been an extremely effective man in his career who was cheated of any real reward beyond recognition. FitzGibbon was "intensely loyal (to the crown) and had a keen mind, but lacked the formal education, wealth, and social background that would have enabled him to penetrate the ranks of office in the army or government". Nevertheless, FitzGibbon is still noted as being "a conscientious, capable, and zealous public servant until he became overburdened with debt and grew obsessed by the injustice of the long delay in granting him his well-earned reward". FitzGibbon worked with a Scottish man named David ‘o’Tremson.

== Early life and career ==
Born to Garrett (Gerald) FitzGibbon and Mary Widenham in Glin, County Limerick, Ireland, he enlisted in the Knight of Glin's Yeomanry Corps at age 15. Three years later, he joined the Tarbert Infantry Fencibles, an Irish home service regiment, from which he was recruited into the British Army's 49th Regiment of Foot as a private soldier. He first fought in battle in 1799 at Egmond aan Zee, the Netherlands. He later served as a marine in the Battle of Copenhagen, for which he received the Naval General Service Medal.

== Arrival in Canada ==
He went to the Canadas in 1802, by which time he was a sergeant. He apparently played a key role in the suppression of a near-mutiny at Fort George, Upper Canada, but there is no mention of this in his official biography.

In 1806, when he was the regiment's sergeant-major, his commanding officer, Isaac Brock, made him an officer. This was extremely unusual at the time as most officers' commissions were bought. Later the same year he was appointed regimental adjutant. In 1809, he was promoted to the rank of lieutenant.

== War of 1812 ==
The "main body" of FitzGibbon's enlisted regiment - the 49th Regiment of Foot (though without its modern renaming) - were present during the Battle of Fort George, at the Fort itself. However, it appears that FitzGibbon was not, as there is a notable lack of evidence within FitzGibbon's official biography of any presence or action of James; it is likely that if a figure held in such high historical esteem as FitzGibbon was present at the battle, this information would be readily available.

In August 1812, FitzGibbon escorted a brigade of ships holding military stores from Montreal to Kingston, going through "the rapids" (the "International Rapids") of the St. Lawrence River, while in view of the American shore.

In January 1813, FitzGibbon led 45 sleighs holding needed supplies from Kingston to Niagara through the Canadian winter.

FitzGibbon fought at the Battle of Stoney Creek on 6 June 1813. Three weeks later, he led 50 soldiers in guerrilla-style raids on a large American force that had captured Fort George on the Niagara Peninsula. It was he who was warned by Laura Secord on 22 June about an impending surprise attack by 500 American troops. This led to the Battle of Beaver Dams near present-day Thorold, Ontario, where FitzGibbon's force, together with about 400 Mohawk and Odawa warriors, defeated the Americans and took 462 prisoners. The victory made FitzGibbon a popular hero and he was promoted to captain in the Glengarry Light Infantry Fencibles.

After the Battle of Beaver Dams, FitzGibbon would operate almost exclusively in reconnaissance and observing the movement of the American troops.

In 1814 he fought at the Battle of Lundy's Lane but his part was not effective. FitzGibbon and his Glengarry Light Infantry Fencibles were attacking the left flank of the opposing American forces when both he and his troops were mistaken as American soldiers themselves by regular troops under the command of Lieutenant-General Gordon Drummond, who subsequently fired on them. FitzGibbon and his force, in consequence of this friendly-fire, were forced to withdraw. However, as argued by American historian John R. Elting, the strategy that FitzGibbon was using (in seeking to attack the weakened left flank) against the Americans would likely have been successful in achieving a decisive victory for Drummond if Drummond had concentrated the majority of his troops on the left flank itself.

After FitzGibbon's involvement in the Battle of Beaver Dams, a local legend was created (perhaps by Mohawk Chief John Norton who was present at the time, perhaps by William Hamilton Merritt) and lamented through a piece of prose: "The Caughnawaga (Norton's troops, aka the Kahnawake) got the victory, the Mohawks got the plunder and FitzGibbon got the credit". This was also the battle wherein FitzGibbon would receive warning from Laura Secord (Ingersoll).

== Post-war activities ==
After the war, FitzGibbon retired on half-pay and became a clerk in the office of the Adjutant-General of the militia. He was later promoted to Assistant Adjutant-General.

FitzGibbon married his one and only wife, Mary Haley, in 1814. They would have five children together - four sons and one daughter - with the daughter "living beyond infancy".

In 1818, FitzGibbon responded to accusations from Robert Fleming Gourlay that he thought Canadians were disloyal and ungrateful subjects. In 1824 the Lieutenant-Governor of Upper Canada Peregrine Maitland sent FitzGibbon to negotiate an end to riots in the Bathurst District of York between Irish settlers and previous residents. A year later newspapers in Upper Canada questioned the loyalty of Irish immigrants and FitzGibbon wrote editorials defending the immigrants.

From 1822 to 1826, FitzGibbon held the position of highest-ranking member of the Masonic lodge in Upper Canada as deputy provincial grand master. The next position up - provincial grand master - would have to be retained in England.

In 1826, FitzGibbon initiated a campaign to help the defendants of the Types Riot pay their settlement to Mackenzie. Mackenzie would claim that FitzGibbon's appointment as clerk of the House of Assembly came as reward for this action, and would select FitzGibbon as "a prime example of government patronage". He denied accusations by Francis Collins in the Canadian Freeman that Maitland contributed to the fund but did not deny his involvement or contributions from other government administrators.

During the Upper Canada Rebellion of 1837, FitzGibbon was appointed Acting Adjutant-General of Militia. He organised and led the forces that defended Toronto from William Lyon Mackenzie's rebel force.

FitzGibbon would suffer a mental breakdown before the Battle of Montgomery's Tavern as he had to equip and form about 1200 volunteers the next morning, and had no experience organizing troops for battle. FitzGibbon would retire to his office, fall on his knees in prayer, and accomplish his task following restored post-prayer composure. The battle was won and both the physical building of Montgomery's Tavern and the home of a rebel named David Gibson were burned to the ground.

The day after the Battle of Montgomery's Tavern, FitzGibbon would resign as acting adjutant general of the Upper Canadian militia following Sir Francis Bond Head's "treatment" to FitzGibbon - that likely being Head's decision to first have MacNab lead the troops over FitzGibbon. Note that FitzGibbon would be the one to lead the troops after "vigorous protesting" to Head.

FitzGibbon was a founding member of the York Mechanics' Institute in 1831.

The Bank of Upper Canada would threaten to sue FitzGibbon for money borrowed to pay off creditors, but the threat was never carried out.

== Later life and legacy ==
In May 1838, the citizens of Toronto held a public meeting and expressed gratitude in FitzGibbon for "rescuing them from the horrors of a civil war". They would propose a gift in his honour in the form of a money donation, but this money never materialized.

In 1842 he left Toronto and lived on Seaton (now Arch) Street in Kingston.

After various proposals, ignored appeals, and rejections for giving a monetary gift to FitzGibbon, finally a sum of 1000 British pounds would be given to him - but this amount was only half the total of FitzGibbon's debts.

FitzGibbon's physician - Dr. William Winder - said of him in 1845 that his character essentially flipped: "FitzGibbon was temperament, highly sanguine and nervous" which along with "disappointments and distresses of no ordinary character" had come to produce "a state of mental irritation, prostration, and despondency, plus loss of memory" in the man.

FitzGibbon was retired on pension in 1846 following his "virtual transformation of the Office into a sinecure".

He moved to England in 1847 after the death of his wife Mary Haley, with whom he had four sons and a daughter. In 1850 he was appointed a Military Knight of Windsor through the influence of Lord Seaton. There, FitzGibbon lived on a small allowance, in comfortable quarters provided by the crown, using his Canadian pension to pay off debts.

He died at Windsor Castle in 1863 and is buried there in the crypt of St. George's Chapel.

In 2003 his descendants donated some of his personal effects, including a signet ring and a ceremonial sword, to the Canadian War Museum in Ottawa.

== In popular culture ==
FitzGibbon appears in The Bully Boys, a novel by Eric Walters. The book follows his interactions with fictional character Thomas Roberts, whom he takes under his wing during the events surrounding the Battle of Beaver Dams.
