= Dominique Ducharme (settler) =

Dominique Ducharme (French pronunciation: [dɔminik dyʃaʁm]; 15 May 1765 – 3 August 1853), from Lachine, Quebec, was a French Canadian fur trader, settler, militia officer, and public servant.

He was named François Ducharme at birth, the son of Jean-Marie Ducharme. In 1793 Ducharme was the first white European to settle in the Fox Valley. He paid two barrels of rum to two Indians for land on both sides of the Fox River near the Kaukauna rapids, this gave him control of the portage around and of the lower Fox. The Ducharme deed was Wisconsin's first recorded deed. He built a house on the land and settled there. He began trading with the Menomini and Chippewa Indians. At the time, 1,500 Indians lived in the village of Kaukauna.

The following year, he and another trader, Jacob Franks, obtained from the Menominee Indians "for value received," a 999-year lease on a total of 1,200 acres (5 km^{2}) on both sides of the Fox at La Baye; at the time Ducharme already possessed a concession on one side of the river beside one of the leased lots. He is presumed to have continued to engage in fur trading in the west for the next 15 years; certainly he acquired a working knowledge of several native dialects.

Ducharme eventually returned to the Montreal district, settling at Lac des Deux Montagnes. On 26 June 1810, he married Agathe de Lorimier, a Métis daughter of Claude-Nicolas-Guillaume de Lorimier, resident Indian agent at Caughnawaga (Kahnawake). On 21 July 1812, after the US invaded Canada, Ducharme was commissioned a lieutenant in the Pointe-Claire Battalion of Militia. In May 1813 Ducharme was ordered to the Niagara frontier, Upper Canada, in command of a party of Six Nations Indians from Lac-des-Deux-Montagnes and Saint-Régis.

He led 300 Caughnawaga Indians to reinforce the militia at Lacolle who were then transferred to Upper Canada in 1813 and based at Burlington Heights along with other native warriors. At the Battle of Beaver Dams, Ducharme organized a party of warriors who effectively forced the American detachment to surrender.

Returning quickly to Lower Canada, Ducharme was placed under the command of Lieutenant-Colonel Charles-Michel d’Irumberry de Salaberry; for his participation in the Battle of Châteauguay on 26 October he was later awarded a medal and clasp. On one occasion, according to the journalist Pantaléon Hudon, Ducharme’s Indians tracked down and captured six deserters from Salaberry’s unit; they were court-martialled and, on the lieutenant-colonel’s orders, shot. Ducharme, who regarded such punishment as too severe, never forgave Salaberry and told him that he would have helped the men to escape had he known the fate that awaited them.

Ducharme remaining years were spent in the quiet obscurity of Lac des Deux Montagnes, where he continued as interpreter for the Indian Department. He died in 1853.
