= Niagara-on-the-Lake Transit =

- Founded: 2012
- Service area: Niagara-on-the-Lake, Ontario
- Service type: bus service
- Operator: Niagara Classic Transport
- Website: transit

Niagara-on-the-Lake Transit was a provider of public transportation in Niagara-on-the-Lake, Ontario, Canada. Initiated on April 2, 2012, it served as a conventional bus operator serving both local residents and tourists. The service was suspended in April 2020 due to the COVID-19 pandemic.

During the off-season (November–April), one bus route was operated, which looped through central Niagara-on-the-Lake (Old Town), then follow the Niagara Stone Road corridor through the villages of Virgil and Glendale. The route ended at Niagara College, at which connections were available to Niagara Falls Transit, St. Catharines Transit, and Welland Transit. During the peak season (May–October), mainline routes terminated at the Niagara-on-the-Lake Community Centre at the edge of Old Town, with limited runs through the city centre. An additional tourist-oriented bus operated solely on this loop, with (varied by demand) service to the Fort George parking lot.

In August 2020, Town Council approved an On-Demand pilot transit project. In May 2022, Council approved an expansion of the service, to take place effective June 20, 2022. This service has replaced the conventional Niagara-on-the-Lake Transit services.

== See also ==
- Public transport in Canada
