= Niagara Parks Commission People Mover =

Tourist-oriented bus service in Niagara Falls, Canada

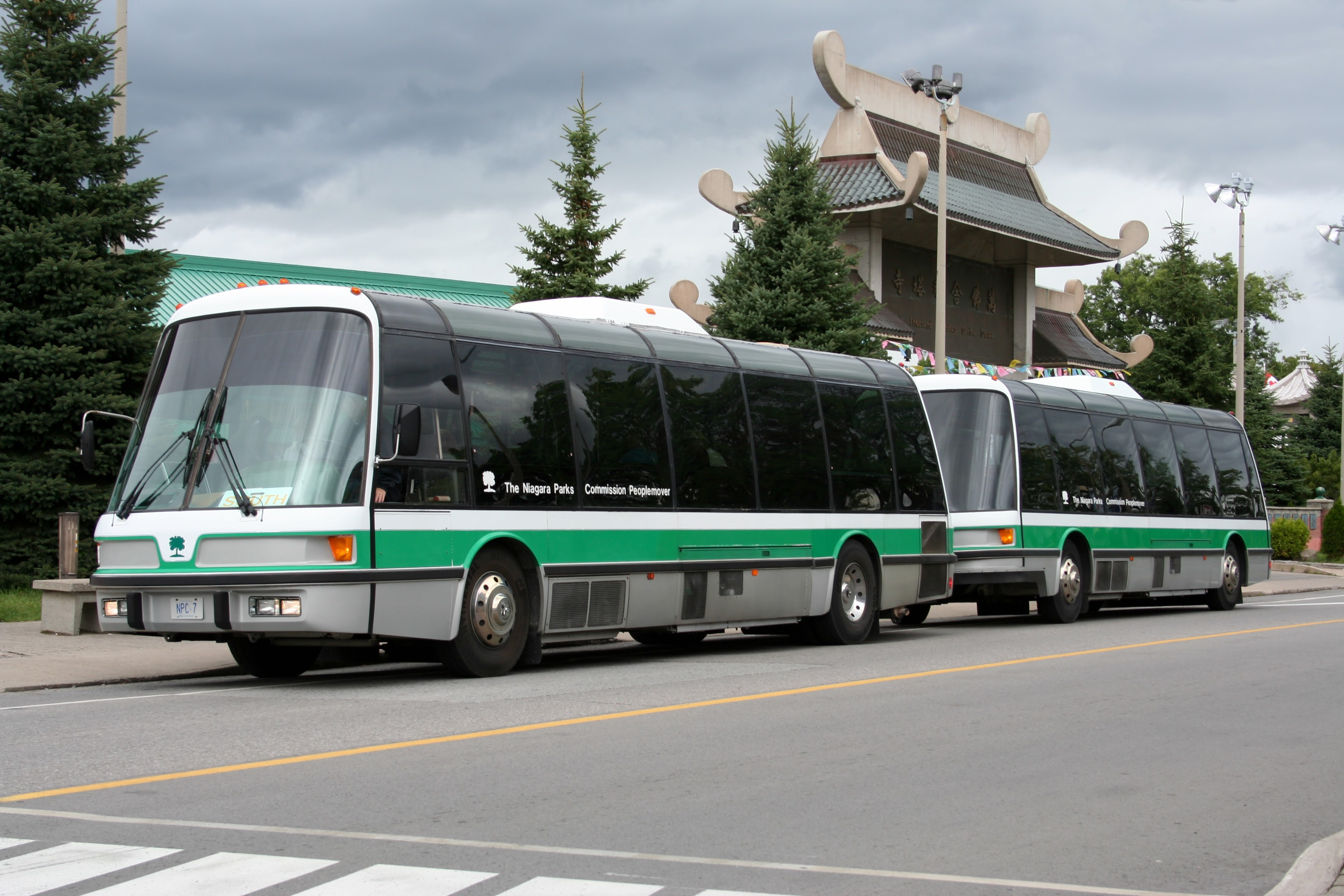
- People Mover bus stopped at the Cham Shan Buddhist Temple
- Founded: 1985
- Defunct: 2012
- Locale: Niagara Falls, ON, Canada
- Service area: Niagara Parkway
- Service type: bus service
- Routes: 1
- Operator: Niagara Parks Commission
- Website: Peoplemover-Buses

The Niagara Parks Commission People Mover was a tourist-oriented, public transport bus service in the city of Niagara Falls, Ontario, Canada. It was operated by the Niagara Parks Commission from 1985 to 2012. It linked various tourist sights and attractions along the Canadian side of the Niagara Falls and the gorge downstream of it.

The People Mover buses replaced the Victoria Park Viewmobile, which had begun service in 1971 in an effort to ease traffic congestion in Queen Victoria Park. The Viewmobiles were two red towing trailers attached to a tractor truck, and served the boundaries of the park, as well as the adjacent Dufferin Islands. The Viewmobiles were retired from service when the new People Mover system launched in time for the 1985 tourist season.

The buses were unusual in that they operated as two-unit buses, comprising a motor unit towing a separate trailer. They should not be confused with the city transit bus service, operated by then Niagara Falls Transit, which had also provided shuttle bus service to the falls area from various parts of the city.

The People Mover service was discontinued in 2012, when the Niagara Parks Commission partnered with Niagara Falls Transit and the City of Niagara Falls to bring new, fully accessible vehicles into service, together with a new identity as the WEGO Niagara Falls Visitor Transportation system.

== Service ==
The service operated along a single 32-kilometre (20 mi) route along the Niagara Parkway from Table Rock Point by the Horseshoe Falls, downstream to the Floral Clock in the north. The stops along the route served attractions including:

- The Journey Behind the Falls
- The Maid of the Mist boat cruise
- The foot of the Clifton Hill tourist promenade
- The Whirlpool Aero Car

At Table Rock Point, the People Mover connected with a free shuttle bus to and from the Rapidsview parking lot, with its hotels and casinos.

The service operated every 20 minutes from April to October each year. A single all-day ticket, issued as a sticker, allowed passengers to hop on and off the buses along the route. Fares for 2011 ended as follows:

- Adult $8.85* Children 6-12 $5.35* Children under 5 FREE

The WEGO Green Line now follows much of the same route as the former People Mover, and continues to be operated by the Parks Commission (as opposed to the Red and Blue Lines before 2025, which were operated by Niagara Falls Transit and its successor Niagara Transit). Since 2013, a separate shuttle service operated during the peak season essentially extends the line as a shuttle to Fort George in Niagara-on-the-Lake.

== Fleet ==
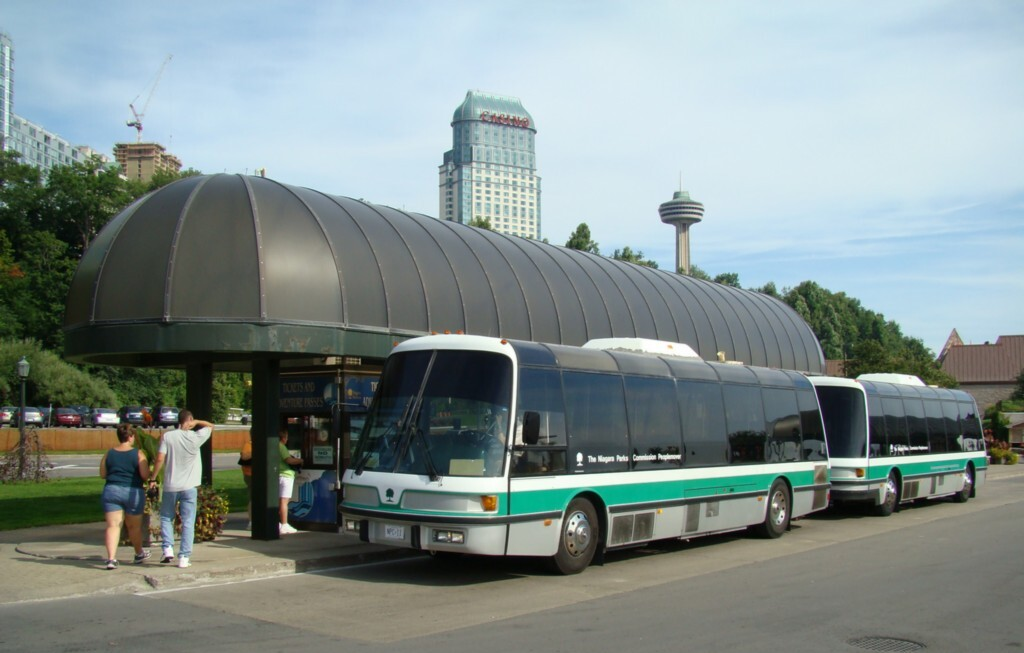
Two-unit people mover bus

The service was operated by a fleet manufactured by Orion Bus Industries between 1985 and 1989 exclusively for the Parks Commission. It consisted of a combination of powered motor units equipped with engines and drivetrains, and unpowered trailer units which were coupled to and towed behind motor units to increase capacity during peak periods. Both motor units and trailers had a single set of double-leafed plug doors for entry and exit, and despite the buses having a low-floor design, they were not wheelchair-accessible. The motor units were powered by liquified petroleum gas, then considered an unusual fuel type. The fleet contained:

- 13x Orion IV 04.501 - 37.5-foot (11.4 m) motor units
- 12x Orion IV 04.502 - 35.5-foot (10.8 m) trailers

With the replacement of the People Mover by the WEGO system, the Orion IV fleet was retired and scrapped in favour of modern, wheelchair-accessible Nova Bus LFX 40-foot and 60-foot articulated vehicles. These newer vehicles are leased from Niagara Transit (Niagara Falls Transit before 2023), but are operated by the Niagara Parks Commission. The entire Orion IV fleet was sold to a private buyer in late 2012.

== See also ==
- Incline railways at Niagara Falls
