= Niagara Falls station (Ontario) =

Railway station in Niagara Falls, Canada

Niagara Falls
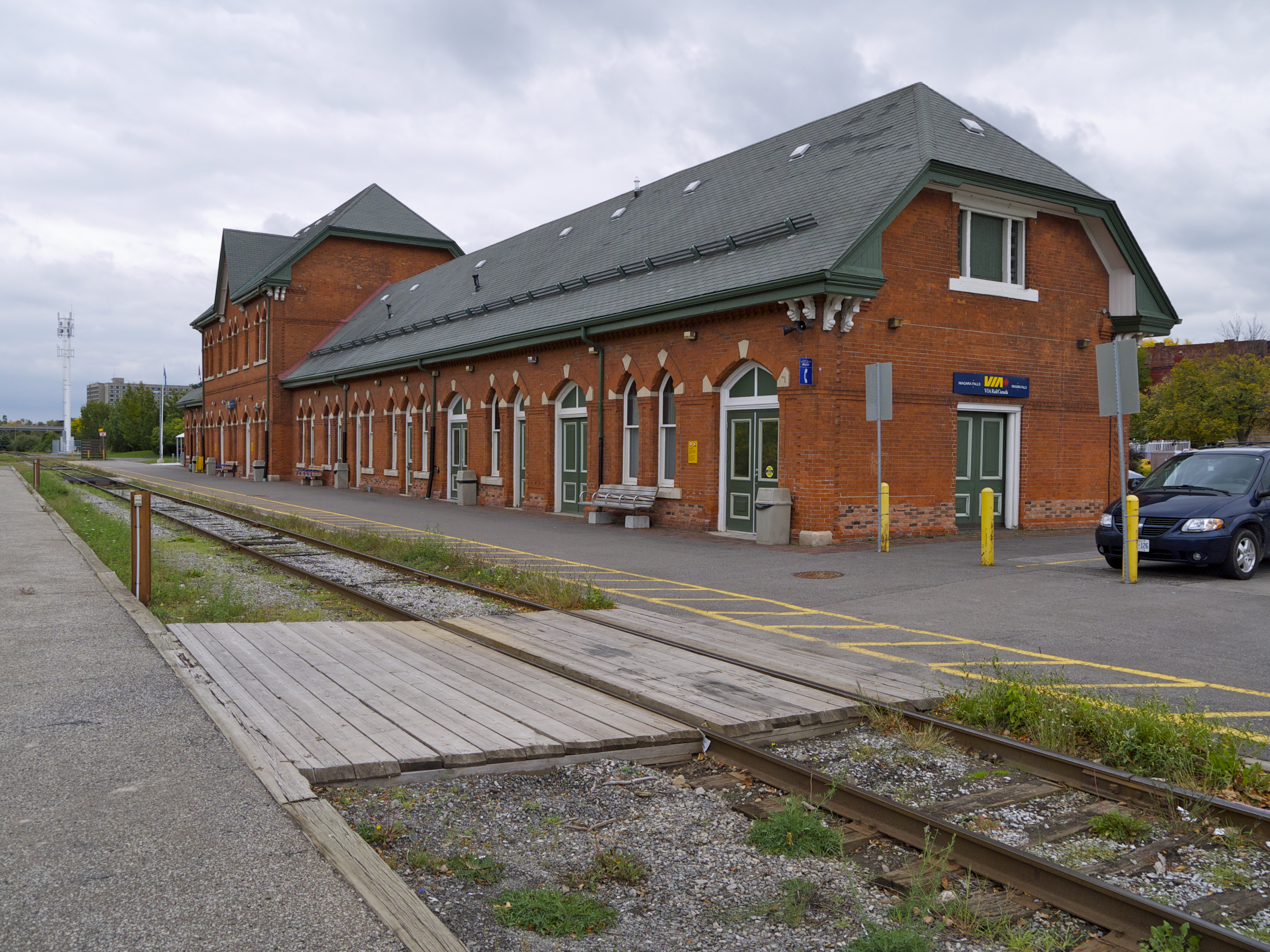
- Track side of the station in 2012

General information
- Location: 4267 Bridge Street; Niagara Falls, Ontario; Canada
- Coordinates: 43.1088°N 79.0634°W
- Owner: Regional Municipality of Niagara
- Platforms: 1 side platform, 1 island platform
- Tracks: 2
- Connections: Niagara Falls Transit Terminal: Niagara Region Transit; GO Transit: 12

Construction
- Structure type: At-grade; heritage building
- Parking: Free; long and short term
- Accessible: Yes

Other information
- Status: Unstaffed station
- Station code: GO Transit: NI; Via Rail: NIAG; Amtrak: NFS
- IATA code: XLV
- Fare zone: 84 (GO Transit)

History
- Opened: 1879; 147 years ago
- Rebuilt: 1980–1990s

Services
Preceding station	Via Rail	Following station
St. Catharines toward Toronto	Maple Leaf	Niagara Falls, New York toward New York
Preceding station	GO Transit	Following station
St. Catharines towards Union	Lakeshore West (peak express)	Terminus
St. Catharines towards Union	Lakeshore West (off-peak express)	Terminus
Former services
Preceding station	Canadian National Railway	Following station
Merritton toward Toronto	Niagara Falls – Toronto; Local stops	Suspension Bridge Terminus

Heritage Railway Station (Canada)
- Official name: VIA Rail/Canadian National Railways Station
- Designated: 1994

Ontario Heritage Act
- Designated: 1999
Location
- Location within Southern Ontario Location within Ontario Location within Canada

Niagara Falls station is an international railway station in Niagara Falls, Ontario, Canada. It is served by the Maple Leaf train between Toronto and New York City and is the terminus of GO Transit's Lakeshore West line towards Toronto. The Gothic Revival station building, which was built in 1879 by the Great Western Railway, is a designated heritage railway station. It is also listed on the Canadian Register of Historic Places.

== History ==
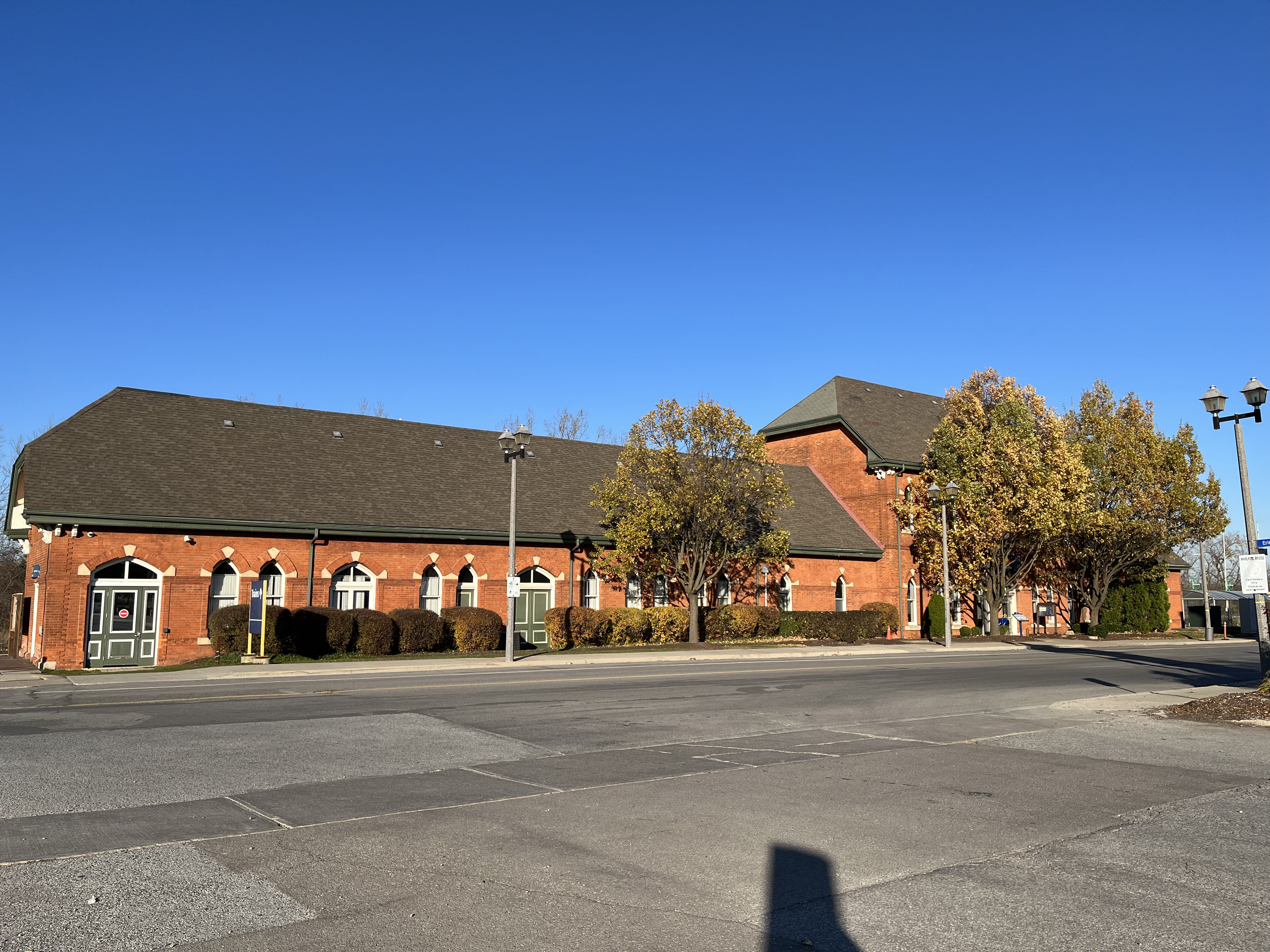
Street side of the station in 2023

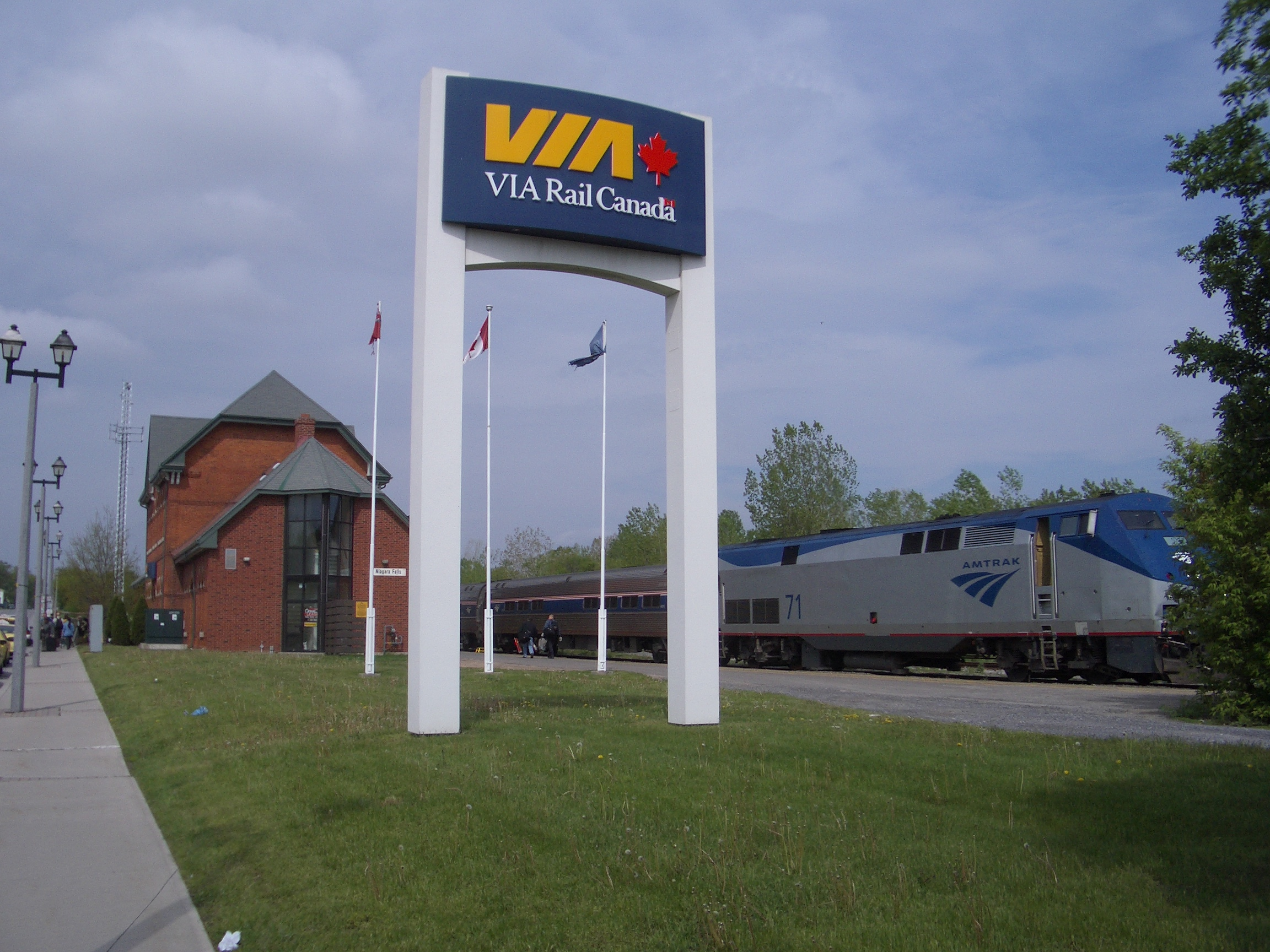
Maple Leaf train at Niagara Falls station

The Victorian Gothic Revival style station was built as the terminus for Great Western Railway (1879–1882) and Grand Trunk Railway (1882–1923). During the period, it was the busiest and the grandest station owned by the railway. The station was renovated in 1951, and the east wing, once housing a restaurant, was partially demolished in 1967. It was acquired by CN Rail for passenger service from 1923 until the 1970s, since when it has been used by Via Rail Canada and more recently by GO Transit since 2009.

In 2012, as a result of federal funding cuts Via Rail Corridor trips between Toronto and Niagara Falls were discontinued, leaving only the single daily Via/Amtrak Maple Leaf service between Toronto and New York. In October 2012, the ticket agent was eliminated, replaced by an automated kiosk.

GO Transit operated summer 'excursion' trains to Niagara Falls on weekends and holidays in 2009 and 2010, making them permanently recurring in 2011. Starting in January 2019, it also began operating a single weekday train trip to and from Niagara Falls. In September 2019, the formerly summer-only weekend train service was extended year-round.

GO Transit was expected to expand full-time rail service along the Niagara Branch to Niagara Falls by 2023 and with it upgrades to the station.

== Services ==
On weekdays as of May 2023, the station is served by three daily round trips on the GO Transit Lakeshore West line, departing toward Toronto in the morning, afternoon and evening. On weekends the station is served by three daily trains in each direction, departing toward Toronto in the afternoon and evening. At all times, GO Transit bus route 12 operates hourly to Burlington GO Station, where it connects to regular train service to Toronto.

Amtrak and Via Rail Canada jointly operate the Maple Leaf train service between Toronto and New York City. The service uses Amtrak rolling stock, but ticketing is shared, and Via crew operates the train along all Canadian stops until it reaches the station where Amtrak crew takes over the operation. The station was served once daily in each direction until March 2020, when Maple Leaf service within Canada was suspended indefinitely as part of a closure of the Canada–United States border to non-essential travel in response to the ongoing coronavirus pandemic. Trains from New York City were truncated to Niagara Falls, New York. Full service between New York City and Toronto resumed on July 27, 2022.

== Customs ==
There are no US preclearance facilities at the station for the Maple Leaf train since both it and its sister station in Niagara Falls, New York, are located along the Canada-US border. Therefore, passengers arriving from the US will be inspected by Canada Border Services Agency (CBSA) officers at the station. Passengers leaving for the US will be processed by Customs and Border Protection (CBP) officers at the Niagara Falls, New York, station on the other side of the Whirlpool Rapids Bridge.

In January 2020, US Senator Chuck Schumer of New York urged the CBSA to open a preclearance facility in the newer Niagara Falls, New York station as one of Canada’s first preclearance operations to improve what he described as an "unpleasant" Canadian inspection experience in the current open-air and uncovered location. In response, the CBSA said it would not commit to a timeline to open any preclearance facilities in the US.

== Niagara Falls Transit Terminal ==
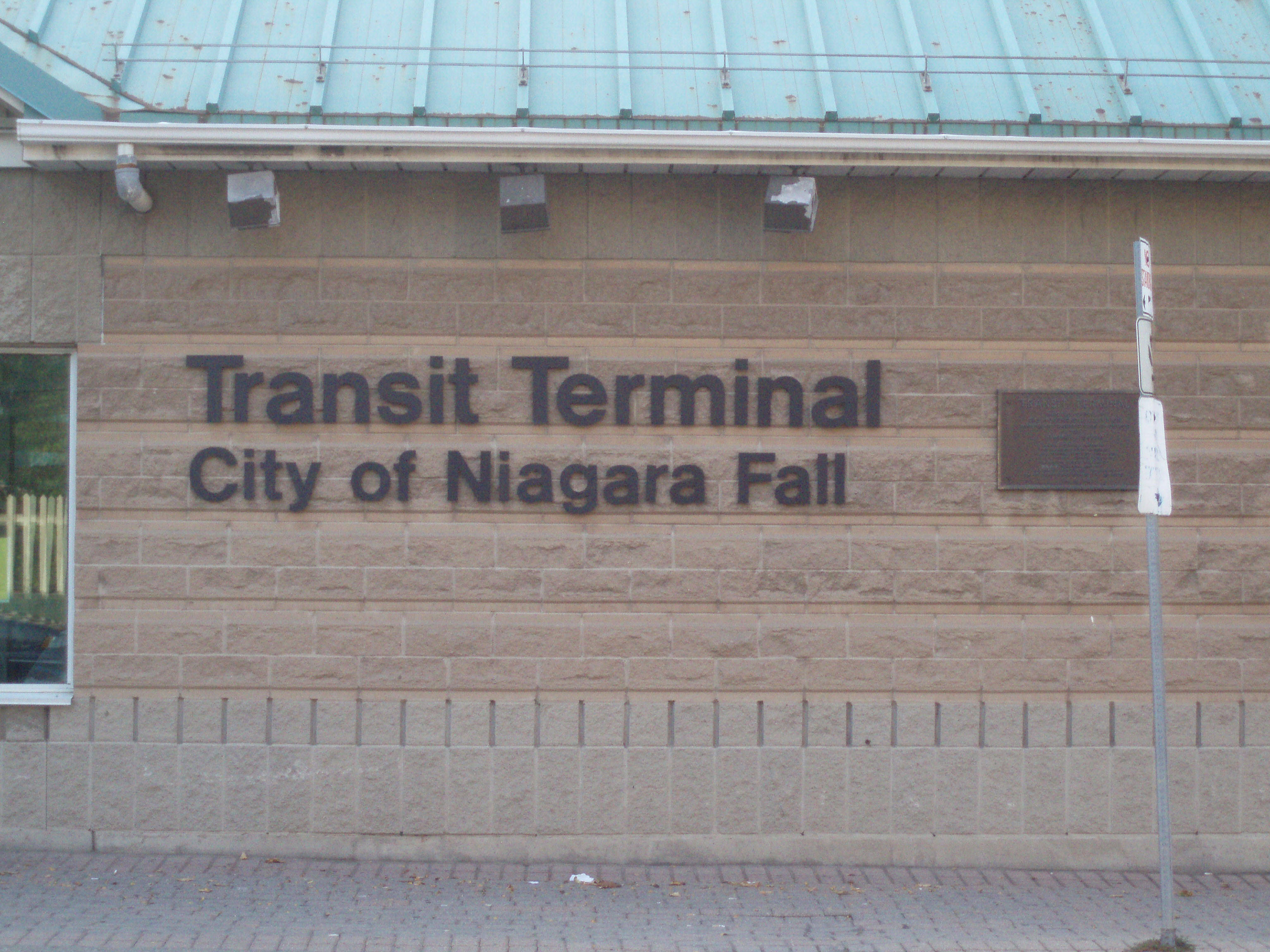
Niagara Falls Transit Terminal

The Niagara Falls Transit Terminal is located directly across Bridge Street from the railway station and serves as the main local, regional and intercity bus terminal for the area. Unlike the train station, the transit terminal is owned and operated by the city of Niagara Falls, Ontario.
