= Niagara Falls Transit Terminal =

Public transport station

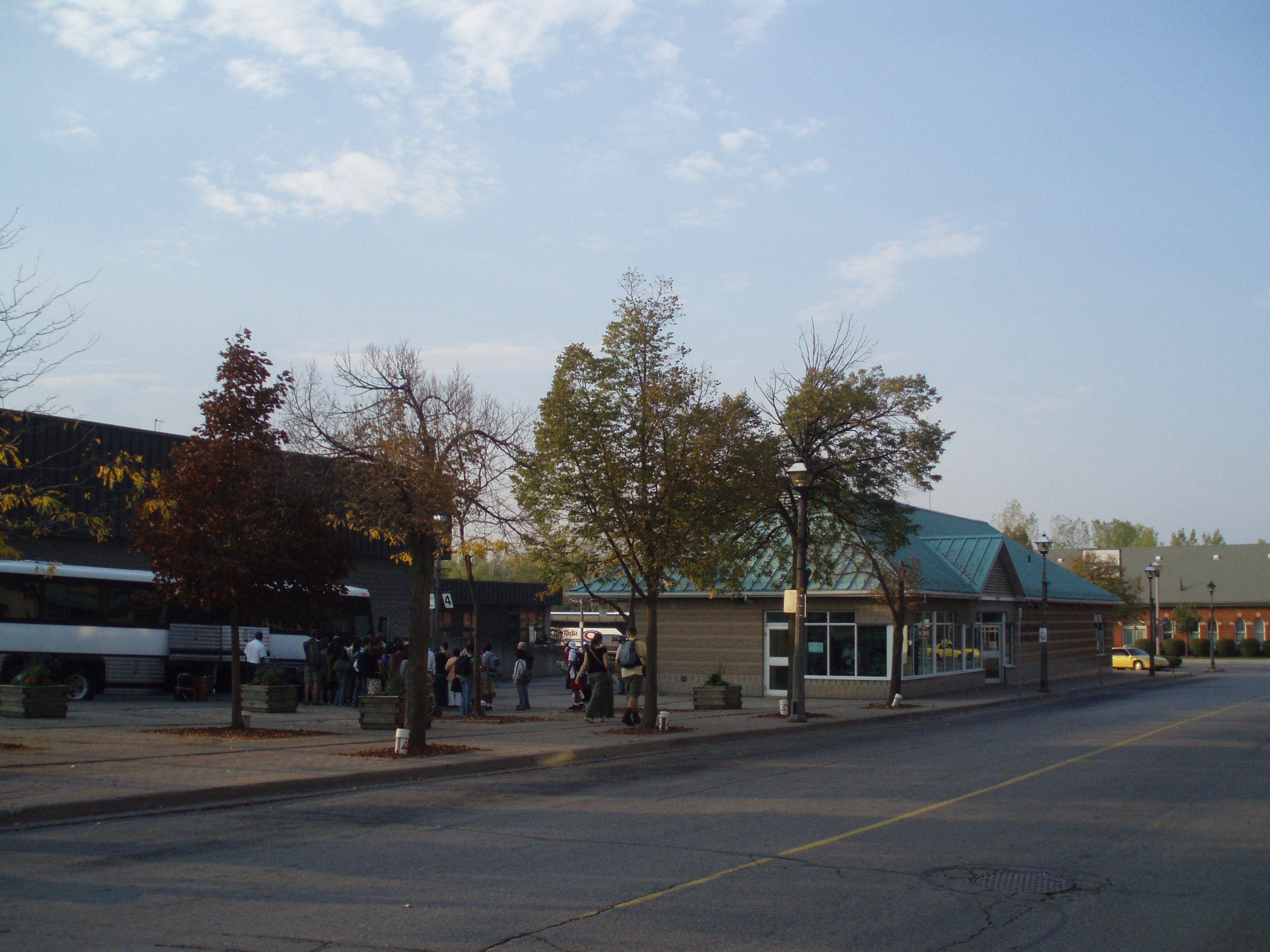

General information
- Location: 4555 Erie Avenue; Niagara Falls, Ontario; Canada
- Coordinates: 43°06′29″N 79°03′49″W
- Owner: City of Niagara Falls
- Bus operators: Niagara Region Transit; WEGO; Megabus (Coach Canada); Greyhound Lines; GO Transit
- Connections: Niagara Falls railway station

Construction
- Parking: None
- Cycle facilities: Rack
- Accessible: Yes

Other information
- Station code: GO Transit: NIFT
Location

Niagara Falls Transit Terminal is located south of Bridge Street on Erie Avenue in Niagara Falls, Ontario, Canada, directly across from the Niagara Falls railway station.

== Services ==
=== Local buses ===
- Niagara Region Transit
  - 102 Hospital
  - 104 Victoria Avenue
  - 108 Thorold Stone Road
  - 204 Victoria Avenue (Evenings, Sundays & Holidays)
- WEGO Green Line

=== Regional buses ===
- GO Transit
  - 12 Niagara Falls/Toronto to Burlington GO Station

=== Intercity buses ===
- Megabus/Coach Canada
  - Toronto via St. Catharines
- Greyhound Lines
  - Toronto - New York City
