= St. Catharines Transit =

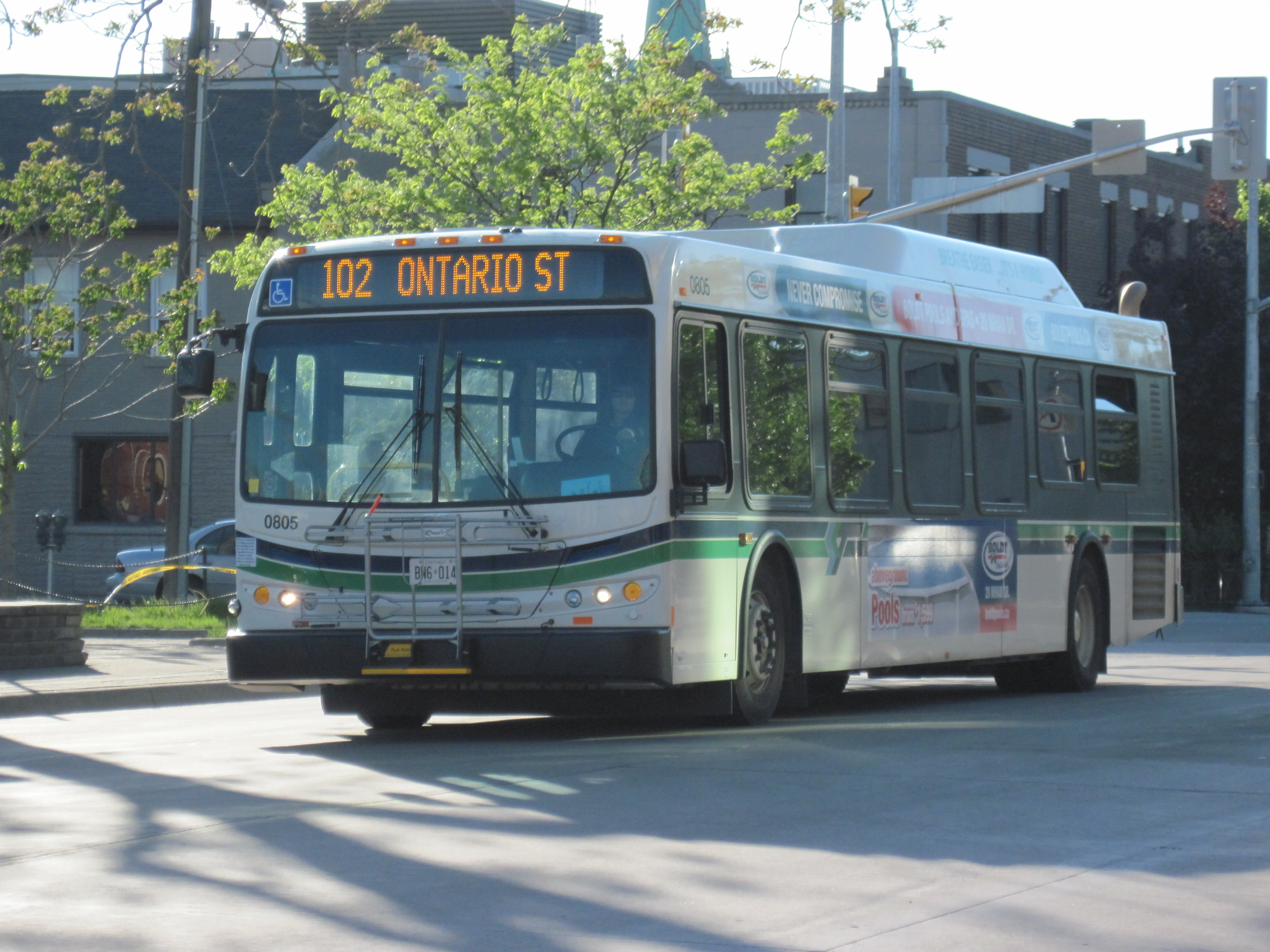
- Bus 0805, a 2008 New Flyer DE40LFR.
- Founded: 1961
- Defunct: 31 December 2022
- Headquarters: 2012 First Street South
- Service area: St. Catharines and Thorold, Ontario
- Service type: Bus service, Paratransit
- Routes: 29
- Stations: Downtown Terminal, 70 Carlisle Street; 43°09′35″N 79°14′38″W
- Fleet: 75
- Fuel type: Diesel, Diesel-electric hybrid
- Operator: St. Catharines Transit Commission
- Website: www.YourBus.com

St. Catharines Transit (SCT) is a provider of Niagara Transit which provided bus services to St. Catharines, Ontario, and the neighbouring city of Thorold. It was originally a public transit service that lasted from 1961 to 2022. The St. Catharines Transit Commission took over operation of transit services within the city from Canadian National Transportation in 1961. In January 2023, St. Catharines Transit was merged with Niagara Falls Transit, Welland Transit, and Fort Erie Transit to form a single regional transit service, Niagara Region Transit.

The Transit Operations Facility opened in 1991 and the Downtown Terminal (within a regional district building of the Ontario Ministry of Transportation) opened in 1996. The bus terminal is also served by Coach Canada for intercity coach service to Toronto, with connections to a number of major cities throughout Canada and the United States.

== History ==
Local public transportation in the area originally consisted of horse drawn cars, subsequently upgraded to electric railway service. Niagara, St. Catharines and Toronto Railway Company, founded in 1898, was acquired by the Canadian Northern Railway in 1908 which became Canadian National Railways in 1918 and converted to bus operations after 1931. The portion of this system operating within the City of St. Catharines was transferred to the St. Catharines Transit Commission in 1961, which adopted the operating name of St. Catharines Transit in 1974. All St. Catharines Transit services and equipment were transferred to Niagara Region Transit in January 2023 to create a single unified regional transit service that included Welland Transit and Niagara Falls Transit. However, buses in the old St. Catharines Transit livery can continue to be seen as not all have been converted to the new livery.

In 2022, the service began exploring an electrification of its existing diesel fleet.

== Former Services ==
=== Regular routes ===
The St. Catharines Transit Commission (SCT) operated most of their routes through Downtown St. Catharines, with routes meeting at the Downtown Bus Terminal. Additional main transfer points also existed at The Pen Centre, Fairview Mall, Thorold Towpath Terminal, and at Brock University.

The majority of the routes operated weekdays using one numbering scheme, while weekday evenings, Saturdays, Sundays and major holidays operated with a separate numbering scheme.

Though it may appear confusing at first glance, many routes interlined, meaning that they continued to other routes once reaching their terminus. This occurs in at the bus terminal in Downtown St. Catharines, and at both northern and southern terminals.

=== Daytime Bus Routes ===
Although the services are no longer operated by St. Catharines Transit, they continue to operate largely unchanged under Niagara Region Transit as of February, 2023.

Route	Name	Terminal	Terminal
301	Hospital	Downtown	Port Dalhousie
302	Ontario Street	Downtown	Lakeshore Road
303	Pelham Road	Downtown	Smart Centre West
304	Oakdale Avenue	Downtown	The Pen Centre
305	Haig Street	Downtown	Linwell & Geneva
306	Lake Street	Downtown	Port Dalhousie
307	Niagara Street	Downtown	Port Weller
308	Grantham Avenue	Downtown	Grantham Lions Park
309	Geneva Street	Downtown	Grantham Lions Park
310	Glenridge Avenue	Downtown	The Pen Centre
311	Hartzell Road	Downtown	St Davids & Ormond
312	Vine Street	Downtown	Lakeshore Road
314	Scott Street	Fairview Mall	Dorchester & Sheman
315	West St. Catharines	Downtown	The Pen Centre
316	Brock-Glenridge	Downtown	Brock University
317	Bunting Road	Downtown	Linewell & Sherman
318	Secord Woods	Downtown	The Pen Centre
320	Thorold	The Pen Centre	Thorold Towpath Terminal
321	Confederation Avenue	Brock University	Thorold Towpath Terminal
322	Thorold South	Thorold Towpath Terminal	Thorold South
323	West Brock Commuter	Brock University	Pelham & Louth
324	Tupper Drive	Brock University	Richmond & Confederation Av
331	Richmond Street	Brock University	Richmond & Confederation Av
332	Brock Towpath	Brock University	Thorold Towpath Terminal
335	Brock-Pen Centre	Brock University	The Pen Centre
336	Brock-Pen-Glendale	Brock University	The Pen Centre
337E	Crosstown-East	Niagara Health System	Lock 3 Museum
337W	Crosstown-West	Lock 3 Museum	Niagara Health System
338	GO Train Connection	Downtown	St. Catharine's GO

=== Weeknight, Weekend, and Holiday Bus Routes ===
Route	Name	Terminal	Terminal
401	Hospital	Downtown	Port Dalhousie
402	Ontario Street	Downtown	Lakeshore Road
403	Pelham Road	Downtown	Smart Centre West
404	Oakdale Avenue	Downtown	The Pen Centre
406	Lake Street	Downtown	Port Dalhousie
408	Grantham Avenue	Downtown	Grantham Lions Park
409	Geneva Street	Downtown	Grantham Lions Park
410	Glenridge Avenue	Downtown	The Pen Centre
412	Vine Street	Downtown	Lakeshore Road
414	Scott Street	Fairview Mall	Dorchester & Sheman
415	West St. Catharines	Downtown	The Pen Centre
416	Brock-Glenridge	Downtown	Brock University
417	Bunting Road	Downtown	Grantham Lions Park
418	Secord Woods	Downtown	The Pen Centre
420	Thorold	The Pen Centre	Thorold Towpath Terminal
421	Confederation Avenue	Brock University	Thorold Towpath Terminal
423 (Weeknights Only)	West Brock Commuter	Brock University	Pelham & Louth
424 (Weeknights Only)	Tupper Drive	Brock University	Richmond & Confederation Av
425 (Weeknights Only)	Brock Bullet	Brock University	Downtown
431 (Weeknights Only)	Richmond Street	Brock University	Richmond & Confederation Av
432 (Weeknights Only)	Brock Towpath	Brock University	Thorold Towpath Terminal
435	Brock-Pen Centre	Brock University	The Pen Centre
436 (Weeknights Only)	Brock-Pen-Glendale	Brock University	The Pen Centre
437E	Crosstown-East	Niagara Health System	Seapark Dr
437W	Crosstown-West	Seapark Dr	Niagara Health System
438	GO Train Connection	Downtown	St. Catharine's GO

=== Paratransit ===
In addition to accessible bus routes, which enable those with reduced mobility to board a 'low floor' transit bus, St. Catharines Transit also provides paratransit services for those who cannot board a regular city bus and accessible bus service is not available.

=== Terminals/Hubs ===
There are many terminals/hubs throughout the system, these include:

- St. Catharines Downtown Terminal
- Fairview Mall Hub
- The Pen Centre Hub
- Thorold Towpath Terminal
- Brock University Hub

== Former Fleet ==
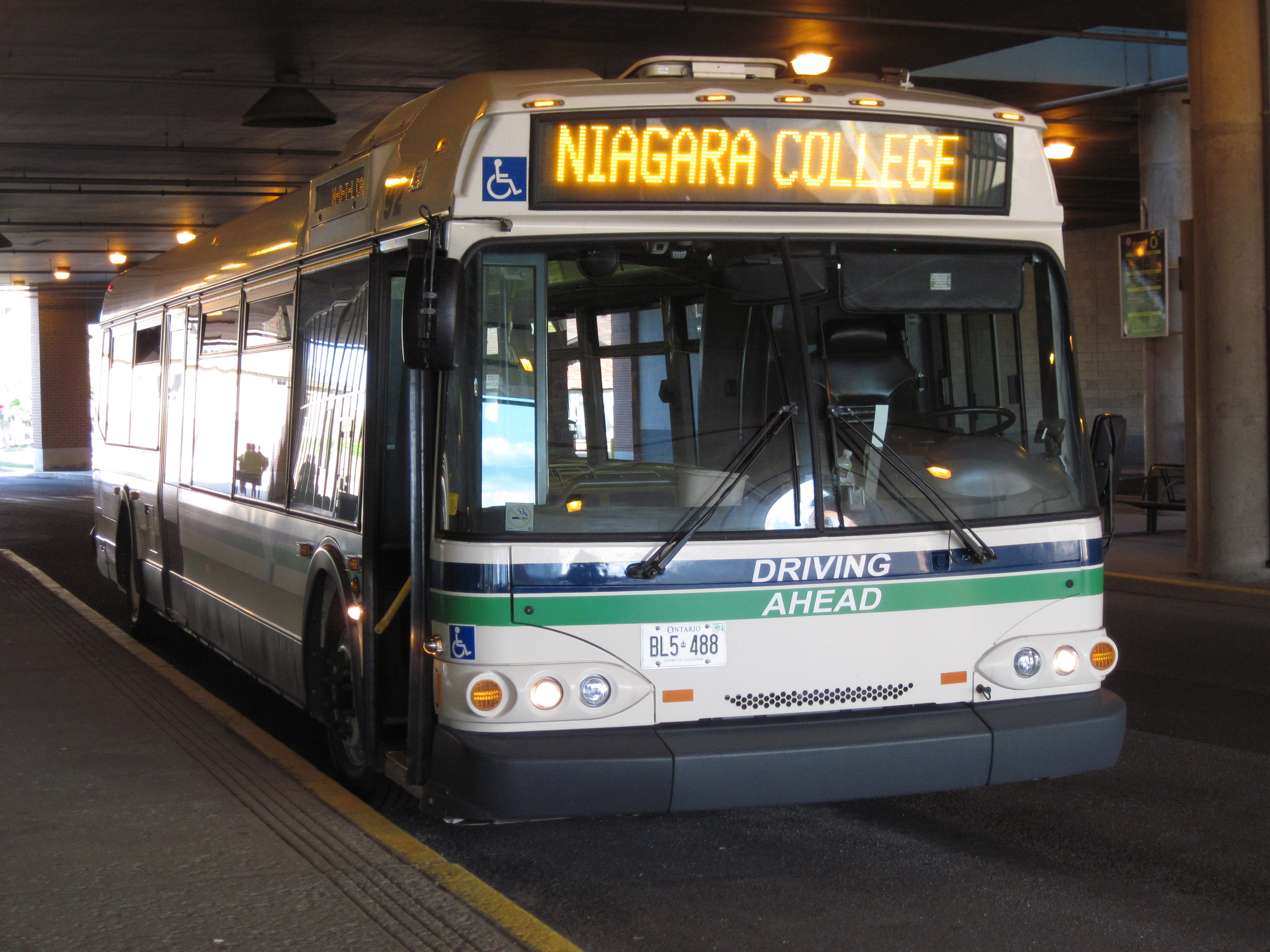

In January 2023, St. Catharines Transit's fleet was transferred to Niagara Region Transit as part of the amalgamation of local transit services in the region.

- New Flyer Industries D40LF
- New Flyer Industries DE40LF
- New Flyer Industries DE40LFR
- New Flyer Industries D60LF
- New Flyer Industries XD40
- New Flyer Industries XD60
- Nova Bus LFS/LFSA

== See also ==
- Public transport in Canada
