= Welland Transit =

Municipal public transit system in Ontario, Canada

- Parent: Niagara Region Transit; City of Welland
- Founded: 1973 as Metro Niagara Transit; 1977 as Welland Transit
- Defunct: December 31st, 2022
- Headquarters: 75 Federal Road
- Locale: Welland,
- Service area: Niagara Region
- Service type: Bus service, Paratransit
- Alliance: Amalgamated Transit Union, Local 1633
- Routes: 8 daytime routes in Welland
- Hubs: Downtown Terminal; Port Colborne City Hall; Niagara College Welland campus Seaway Mall
- Stations: Welland Transit Terminal
- Fleet: 16 30-40 ft units, 8 accessible 28.5 ft units
- Fuel type: Diesel, Gasoline, HEV
- Operator: City of Welland
- Website: Welland Transit [www.facebook.com/wellandpublictransit]

Welland Transit is a provider of Niagara Transit in Welland, Ontario, Canada. It was originally a public transit service from 1973 to 2022 known as Welland Transit upon its inception in 1973, service was operated by a private company, known as "Metro Niagara Transit," funded by the city of Welland, which assumed full operation of the transit system in 1977. On January 1, 2023, it was merged with St. Catharines Transit and Niagara Falls Transit to form as Niagara Transit.

Eight scheduled routes provided Monday to Sunday daytime service with staggered services during off-peak times and evening service (between 6-11 pm Monday to Saturday). Weekday service was provided on three routes to destinations outside the city to Port Colborne, Niagara Falls, and St. Catharines, under Niagara Region Transit. For outlying areas of the city, a service called Trans-Cab offered taxi connections to the conventional bus service for a small additional fee. Accessible services for people unable to make use of regular buses were available within the city or across the region.

== Facilities ==
=== Transit Offices and Garage ===
Address: 75 Federal Road
Coordinates: 42°58′07″N 79°15′28.5″W
Functions: Operations and administration, bus charters and bus maintenance/storage.

=== Transit Terminal ===
Address: 160 East Main St.
Coordinates: 42°59′34″N 79°14′47″W
Opened: January 19th, 1994
Functions: Hub for all city bus routes and provision of intercity services
- Niagara Region Transit service to St. Catharines and Niagara Falls
- Megabus/Coach Canada service to Toronto with local stops along the way

== Former Services ==
=== Bus routes ===
Welland Transit operated the following routes;

==== Regular service ====
Core routes operated Monday through Friday from approximately 6:00AM to 11:00PM, on Saturday from approximately 6:30AM to 10:00PM, and Sunday from 10:00AM to 6:00PM.

- 501 Broadway
- 502 Rice Road
- 503 First Avenue
- 504 Fitch Street (a trans cab was used from July 2012 to July 2, 2013)
- 505 Lincoln-Wellington
- 506 Ontario Road
- 508 Woodlawn
- 509 Niagara

==== Student Link Services ====
- 23. Brock University Link provided September to May service between Niagara College in Welland and Brock University in St. Catharines, where there are bus connections available to St. Catharines, Thorold and Niagara Falls at the Brock University Hub. The route was taken over by Niagara Region Transit in September 2019, and renamed 70/75A - St Catharines Express via Pelham.
- 34. Niagara-on-the-Lake Link provided September to May service between the two campuses of Niagara College. This route was taken over by Niagara Region Transit in September 2019, renamed 40/45A - Niagara-on-the-Lake (NOTL) Express.

==== Special and Contracted Services ====
- Route 25 - Port Colborne Link made trips daily (except Sundays) and operated as a flag stop route as it connected downtown Port Colborne with downtown Welland.
- 701/702. Port Colborne Community routes were offered until December 31, 2021, until they were scrapped for the Niagara Region Transit On-Demand Service.

=== Trans-Cab ===
Extended service to areas with insufficient traffic to warrant a regular bus route by means of a taxi connection to the existing bus network. Suburbs served are Cooks Mills, Dain City, Hunters Pointe, and Quaker Road Trans Cab Connections.

=== Well-Trans ===
Well-Trans (formerly Handi-Trans), provided accessible service for those not able to use a regular transit bus, for qualified pre-registered clients. The service operated between 7:15 am and 7:00 pm on weekdays and from 9:30 am to 6:15 pm on Saturdays, with service from 10 am to 6 pm on Sunday.

=== Niagara Specialized Transit ===
This service, operated by the Canadian Red Cross, is for eligible residents of Niagara Region who need to travel between municipalities for medical appointments, employment or education purposes.

== See also ==
- Public transport in Canada
