= Fort Erie Transit =

Public transportation authority of Fort Erie, Ontario

- Founded: 1977
- Defunct: 31 December 2022
- Headquarters: 1 Municipal Centre Drive
- Locale: Town of Fort Erie
- Service area: Fort Erie, Crescent Park, Ridgeway, Crystal Beach
- Service type: bus service, paratransit
- Routes: 1
- Fleet: 3
- Operator: TOK Transit
- Website: fetransit.ca at the Wayback Machine (archived November 28, 2021)

Logo used by previous operation

Fort Erie Transit is a provider of Niagara Transit in Fort Erie, Ontario, Canada.

It was a public transit service that lasted from 1977 to 2022. The Town of Fort Erie start providing public transit service since 1977. On January 1, 2023, it was merged with St. Catharines Transit, Welland Transit, and Niagara Falls Transit to form Niagara Region Transit. Public transit is 100% accessible and meets Accessibility for Ontarians with Disabilities (AODA) legislation and standards. TOK Transit (originally Can-ar Coach Service) has operated Fort Erie Transit since 2012.

== Services ==
=== FETransit Schedule & Route ===
Regular operation consists of three routes served by three buses, running approximately (in each direction along headways) once every two hours. The routes serve Fort Erie, Crystal Beach, Ridgeway, Stevensville and Black Creek and many neighbourhoods and areas in between.

=== FAST ===
Fort Erie Accessible Specialized Transit (FAST) provides transportation for those unable to walk 175 metres or board a regular Fort Erie Transit bus. The FAST service is operated by the Canadian Red Cross Niagara on behalf of the Town of Fort Erie.

=== Niagara Specialized Transit ===
This service is for eligible residents of Niagara Region who need to travel between municipalities for medical appointments, employment or education purposes.

=== Intercity service ===
As of September 2, 2008, Niagara Transit started operating service from Niagara Falls into Fort Erie, connecting with the Fort Erie Transit bus at the Municipal HUB at 3 Municipal Centre Drive, Fort Erie.

Private intercity coach services are primarily operated by Coach Canada with connections to St. Catharines and Toronto. The terminus is located at Robo Mart, 21 Princess Street at Waterloo Street.

== See also ==
- Public transport in Canada
