= WEGO (Niagara Falls) =

Tourist-oriented bus service in Niagara Falls, Canada

WEGO Visitor Transportation

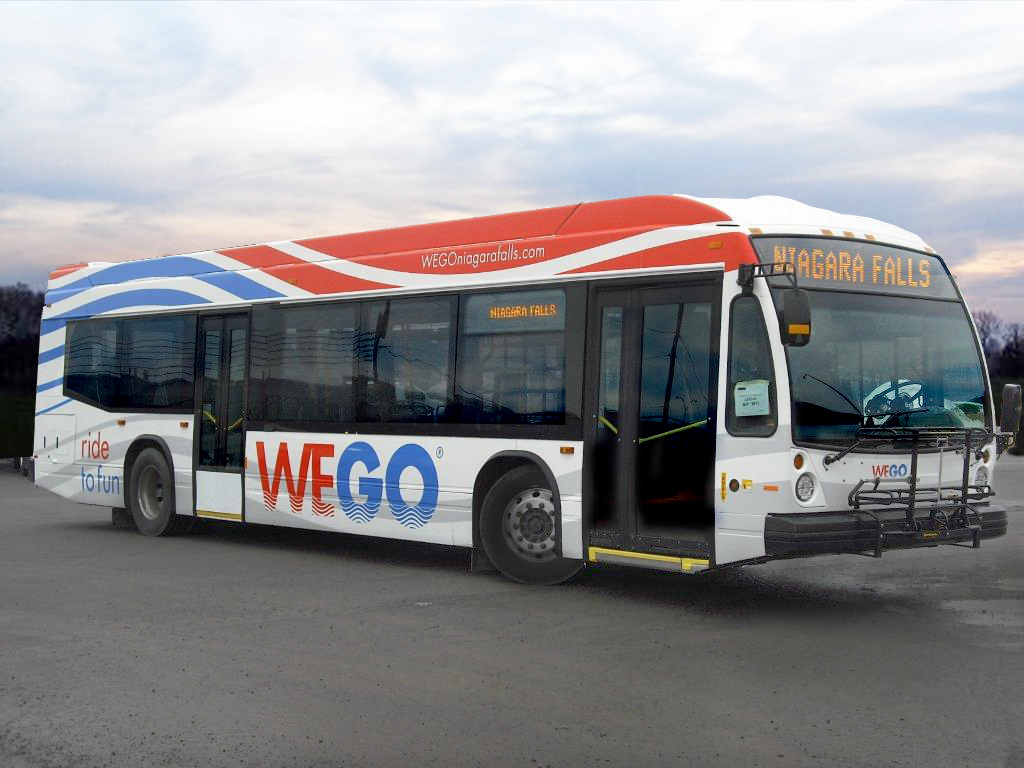
- Parent: Niagara Parks Commission
- Founded: 2012
- Service area: Niagara Falls, Niagara-on-the-Lake
- Service type: bus service
- Routes: 3
- Fuel type: diesel
- Operator: Niagara Parks Commission
- Website: wegoniagarafalls.com

WEGO Visitor Transportation System (WEGO) is a bus system in Niagara Falls, Ontario operated by the Niagara Parks Commission. It replaced Niagara Falls Transit's Falls Shuttle, as well as the Niagara Parks Commission People Mover. Originally scheduled to launch on June 29, 2012, the service's inauguration was postponed due to delays in its buses' intelligent transportation system. WEGO launched its preview service on August 13, 2012, then finally began official operations, a week later, on August 20. WEGO is a pairing of the words "we" and "go". WEGO is not an acronym for anything, however.

== Fares and connections ==
Fares are accurate as of July 2026.

Age group	All Lines	
Age group	24-hour pass	48-hour pass
2 and under	Free	Free
3 to 12	$12.00	$16.00
13 and over	$16.00	$20.00

=== Connections and transfers ===
Connections between the local Niagara Transit service and WEGO require separate fares. WEGO pass holders transferring to Niagara Transit must pay a Niagara Transit fare. Niagara Transit transfers are not valid on WEGO.

WEGO also connects with inter-regional transit customers using GO Transit, VIA Rail, and Coach Canada via the Green Line. GO Transit stations along the Niagara excursion train sell WEGO passes when the train is in operation.

== Routes ==
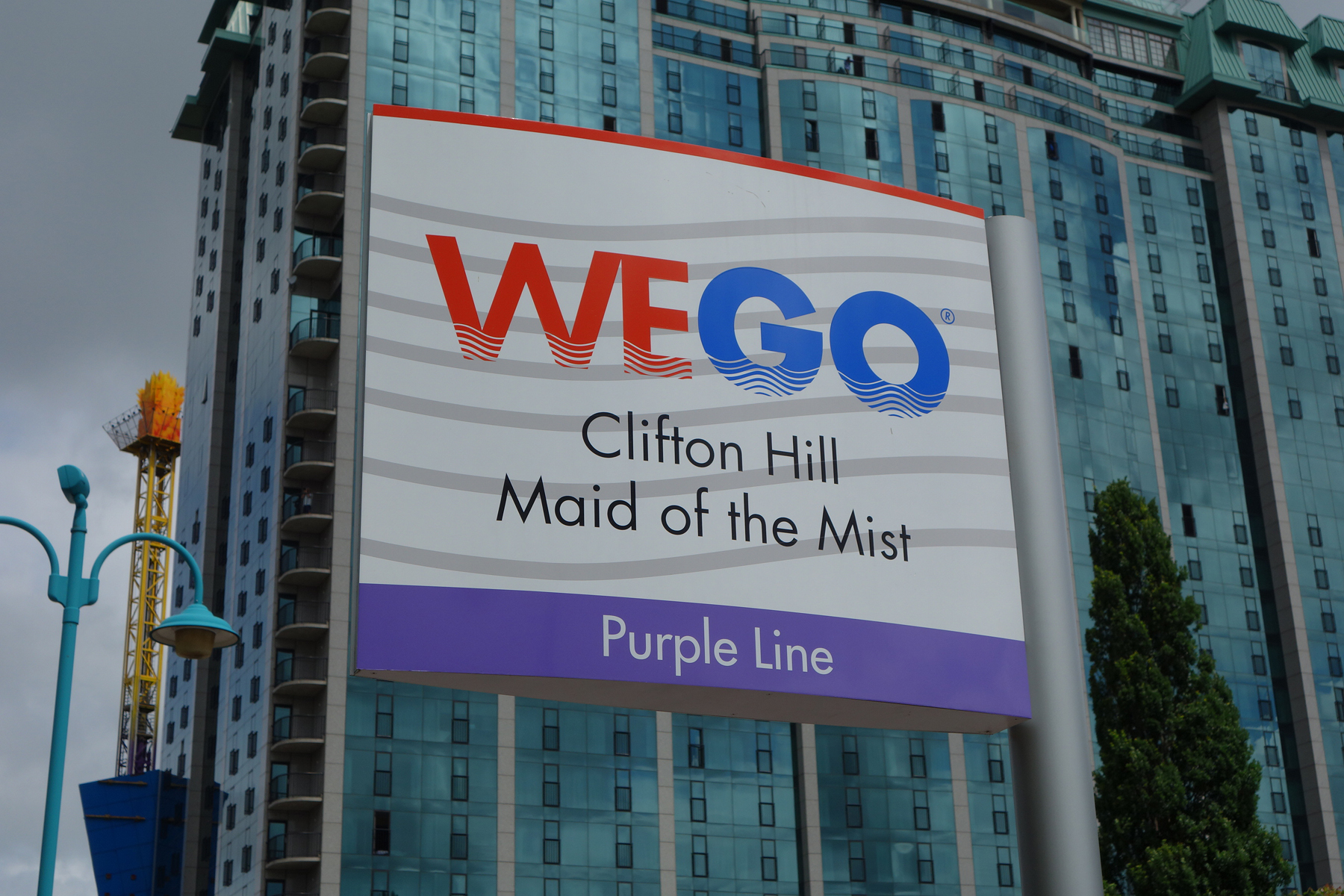
A WEGO Purple Line bus stop sign on Clifton Hill

WEGO routes are operated by the Niagara Parks Commission, who leases the buses from Niagara Transit. Niagara Transit (formerly Niagara Falls Transit) used to operate certain lines using WEGO buses, until an agreement was ended in August 2024.

Line	Terminus		Areas served
Blue Line	Rapidsview Parking Lot Loop Line via Table Rock, Clifton Hill and Fallsview		Clifton Hill; Fallsview
Green Line	Rapidsview Parking Lot	Floral Clock	Niagara Falls segment of Niagara Parkway
Niagara-on-the-Lake Shuttle	Floral Clock	Fort George National Historic Site	Niagara-on-the-Lake segment of Niagara Parkway

== Features ==
WEGO incorporates intelligent transportation systems (ITS) to its bus operations, which allows the following:

- real-time bus arrivals by scanning a QR code at the bus stop
- signal priority to minimize intersection delays
- automated fare collection
