= Cobourg Transit =

Community transit system of the Town of Cobourg

- Parent: Cobourg and Coach Canada
- Founded: 1970
- Headquarters: 55 King Street West
- Locale: Cobourg, Ontario
- Service area: urban area
- Service type: bus service
- Routes: 2 + 1
- Operator: Century Transportation
- Website: Cobourg Public Transit

Cobourg Transit is a fully accessible community transit system that serves the Town of Cobourg, operating with a fleet of diesel buses. The buses are separated into two areas on the interior, the front having low floors with seating reserved for accessibility access if needed, and poles to help riders safely stand. The section behind the second door is raised by some steps, and being just seating without much open space.

Bus service is provided on two routes which meet every hour at the Northumberland Mall and the Rotary Waterfront Park bus terminal As a result of each route being operated by a single bus at a time, bus stops are labelled by the minute of the hour the bus is scheduled to arrive. These regular routes operate Monday to Friday from 6:15 am to 7:45 pm, Saturdays from 8:15 am to 6:45pm and Sundays from 8:45 am to 3:45 pm. There is also an inter-municipal shuttle service to Port Hope, which connects at the mall or Northumberland Hills Hospital with Port Hope Transit.

Cobourg Transit also offers a specialised service called WHEELS to let people who cannot use conventional transit still get around the town.

During the COVID-19 pandemic, the buses were outfitted with signage to indicate appropriate distancing, and only accept coins like toonies for physical payment.

== Fares ==
The standard fare for the bus service is $2, $1 if making a transfer from the Port Hope shuttle. Cobourg Transit also offers various other payment methods, sold at Victoria Hall and the Cobourg Public Library, both near bus stops; these include tickets and bus passes. The town has no plans to implement Ontario's Presto card, and the after school pass is sold within secondary schools to students to promote active transport.

Payment type	Price
Cash fare	$2
Tickets	10 for $16
Adult monthly pass	$60
Senior monthly pass	$30
Student monthly pass	$50
After school pass (effective on weekends, and after 2:30pm on weekdays.)	$15
Children 5 and under	free

== On Demand service ==
On April 19, 2021, Cobourg began a pilot project for demand responsive transport in the city of Cobourg, after a review was finished exploring financial optimisations for the city. The transport advisory committee made a plan based on the review to experiment with software developed by RideCo, the goal being to reduce operating costs and emissions, and to get as many people in the bus as possible. The new service would launch in between 2020 and 2022, and is now known to residents as Cobourg Ride. Originally, the service was going to assist with the operation of the regular transit, as suggested by a survey monitored closely by the review, however, the town appears to have redirected to full on demand service in the near future.

=== Usage ===
In order to use the on demand bus, riders need to book in advance, using the webpage, phone app, or by calling the transit operator.

=== Phase 2 ===
On June 14, 2021, the town intends to fully implement RideCo's service, removing the conventional fixed route transit, and will also fully implement WHEELS within the service by then.

== Routes ==
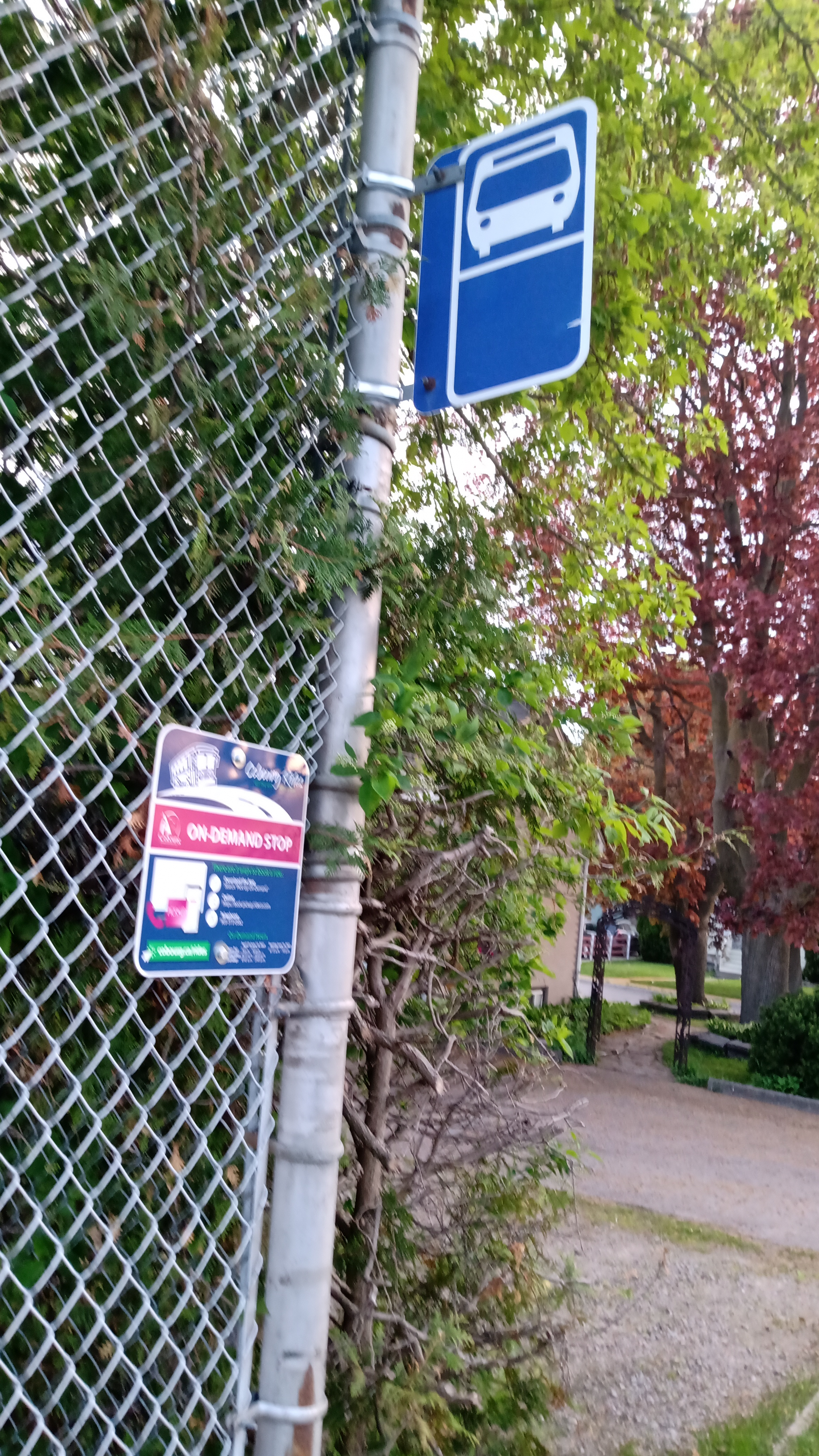
A route 2 stop along University Avenue West, right beside St. Michael's Elementary School.

Prior to 2021, the Town of Cobourg had two active transit routes. Both routes had various stops within suburbs, nearby to schools, and by suburban shopping centres. Both routes shared a stop at the Northumberland Mall and the terminal in front of Rotary Waterfront Park, and various stops along Division Street. Route 1 is characterised by its comprehensive coverage of midtown and downtown suburbs, with many stops around schools and important locations, before heading to various big box stores and the mall. Route 2 is less comprehensive, providing minimal suburb, school, and shopping coverage, while instead prioritising serving key locations, like the Cobourg Community Centre.

In 2021, Cobourg Transit had switched to a complete on-demand service for all stops.

In September 2024, Cobourg Transit will launch a fixed-route, additionally to on-demand services.

Former Routes

=== Route 1 ===
Route 1 first travels easts, near the Cobourg Collegiate Institute, before going through several suburbs. It then drives crosstown to reach the Northumberland Hills Hospital, passing stops near various schools during the sequence. Afterwards, route 1 finishes up its trip by stopping at a Smart Centre, followed by Northumberland Mall. It passes the YMCA, then goes through one last suburb before returning downtown.

=== Route 2 ===
Route 2 follows a similar structure, and has additional stops by ServiceOntario, the Northumberland Country Administration office building, court building, St. Mary Catholic Secondary School and the suburb around the school, and the Cobourg Community Centre.

== See also ==
- Public transport in Canada
