= Port Hope Transit =

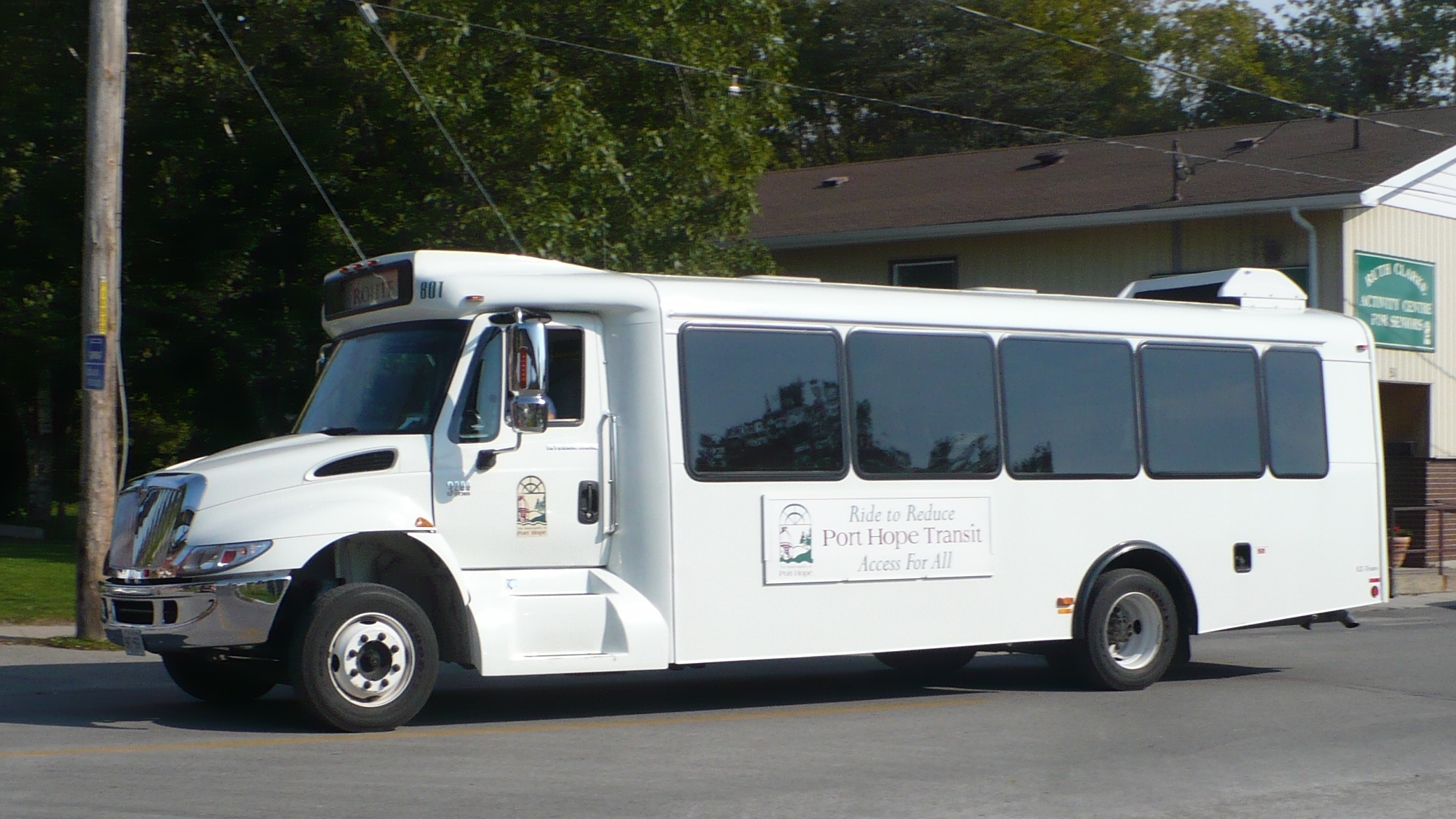
- Parent: Municipality of Port Hope
- Headquarters: 346 Ward Street
- Locale: Port Hope, ON
- Service area: Urban area
- Service type: Bus service
- Routes: 4
- Operator: Coach Canada
- Website: Port Hope Transit

Port Hope Transit is the local bus service provider in the Municipality of Port Hope, Ontario, which is located on the north shore of Lake Ontario about 109 kilometres (68 mi) east of Toronto. With a population of only 16,390 people in 2006, this is one of the few smaller communities in the province with a fully funded public transit system.

Two regular routes serve the community with an additional inter-municipal shuttle service to Northumberland Mall and Northumberland Hills Hospital in Cobourg, which connects with the Cobourg Transit system. An additional route, which is a modified version of Route A, serves the local high school, Port Hope High School, twice a day while school is in session.

== Routes ==
- A- (west side loop)
- A (High School Run Only) - Only to the High School twice a day on school days
- B- (east side loop)
- C - Cobourg Express Shuttle (intermunicipal service)

== See also ==
- Public transport in Canada
