= Regional Municipality of Niagara =

Niagara Region
- Regional municipality (upper-tier)
- Regional Municipality of Niagara
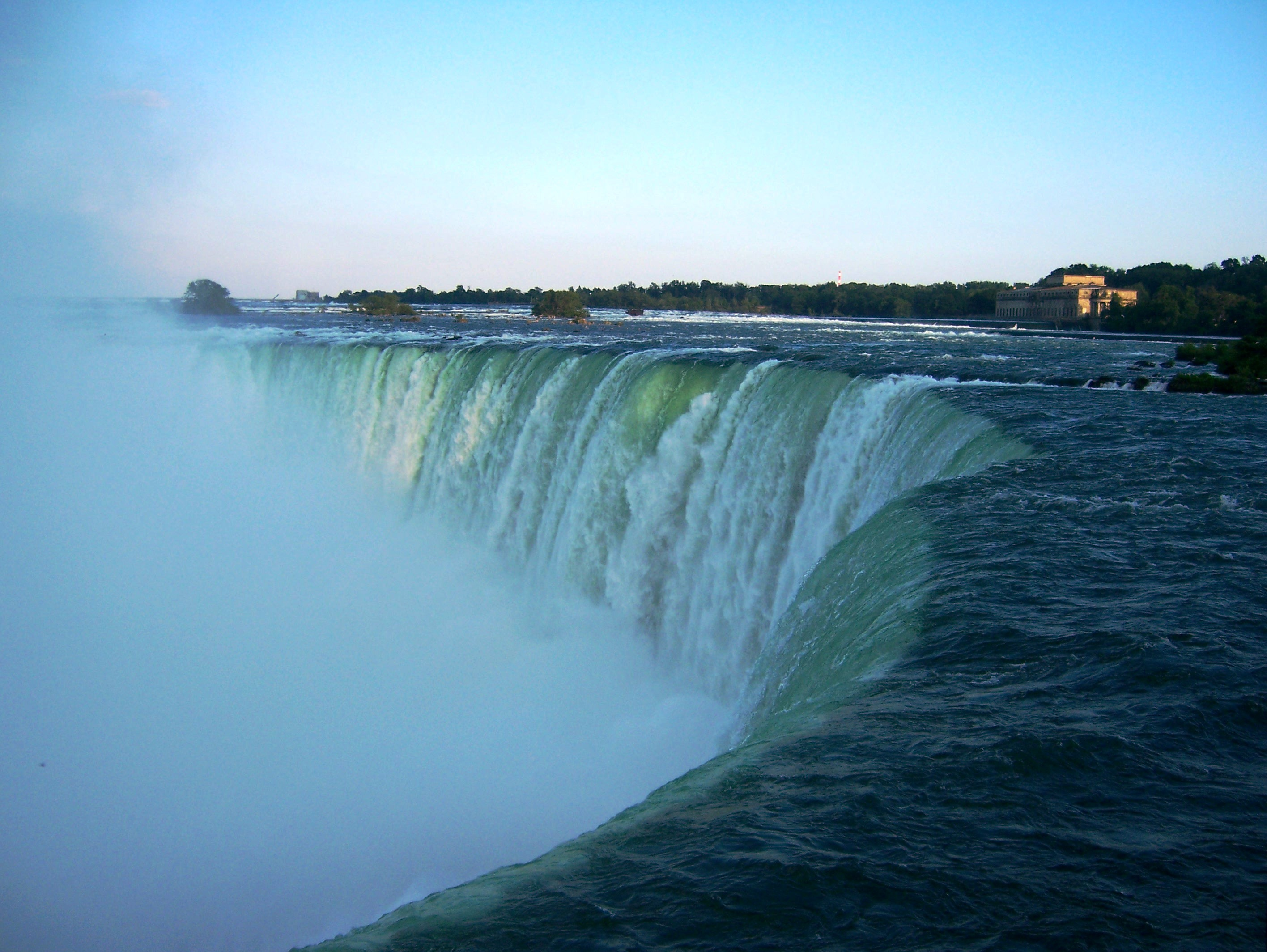
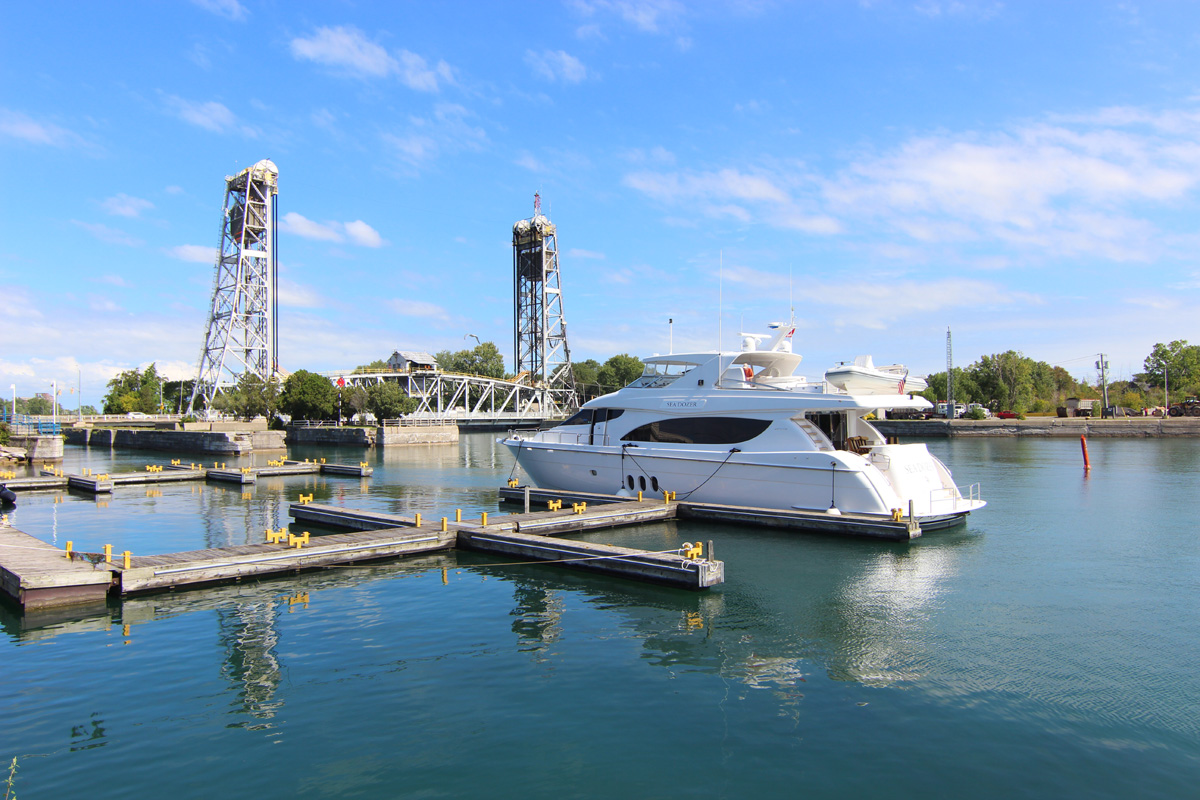
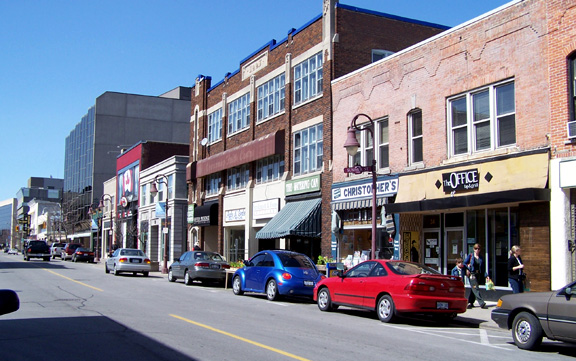
- Niagara Falls (Horseshoe Falls), the Welland Canal in Port Colborne, and Downtown St. Catharines.

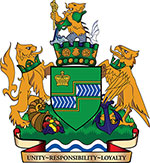
- Flag Coat of arms Logo
- Motto: Unity, Responsibility, Loyalty

- Location of Niagara within Ontario
- Coordinates: 43°02′33″N 79°18′02″W
- Country: Canada
- Province: Ontario
- Formed: 1970 (from Welland and Lincoln Counties)
- Seat: Thorold

Government
  - Chair: Bob Gale
  - Governing body: Niagara Regional Council
  - MPs: Dean Allison, Chris Bittle, Fred Davies, Tony Baldinelli
  - MPPs: Jeff Burch, Wayne Gates, Sam Oosterhoff, Jennie Stevens

Area
  - Land: 1,852.82 km^{2} (715.38 sq mi)

Population (2021)
  - Total: ▲477,941
  - Density: 258/km^{2} (670/sq mi)

Gross Metropolitan Product
  - St. Catharines – Niagara CMA: CA$17.4 billion (2020)
- Time zone: UTC−05:00 (EST)
  - Summer (DST): UTC−04:00 (EDT)
- Website: www.niagararegion.ca

The Regional Municipality of Niagara, also colloquially known as the Niagara Region or Region of Niagara, is a regional municipality in Southern Ontario, Canada, which occupies most of the Niagara Peninsula. As of 2024, the region had an estimated population of 539,180. St. Catharines is the region's largest city, while the regional seat is located in Thorold.

The Niagara Region is bounded to the north by Lake Ontario and to the south by Lake Erie. The region is bordered in the west by Haldimand County and the City of Hamilton, with its eastern boundary at the Niagara River, which is also the international border with the U.S. state of New York. The Niagara Region is the southernmost part of the Golden Horseshoe, the most populated region of Ontario.

Unique natural landscapes make the Niagara Region an important centre for agriculture and tourism in Ontario. The most important agricultural enterprise in Niagara is viticulture, or winemaking. The Niagara Wine Route, which connects visitors to dozens of wineries, is a growing tourism draw while the internationally renowned Niagara Falls is one of Canada's major tourist attractions. Along with Shaw Festival, held annually in Niagara-on-the-Lake, and the Welland Canal, the Regional Municipality of Niagara receives up to 12 million visitors each year. The Niagara Region has been populated by First Nations such as the Neutral, the Haudenosaunee, and the Anishinaabe, including the Mississaugas of the Credit First Nation.

== Administrative divisions ==
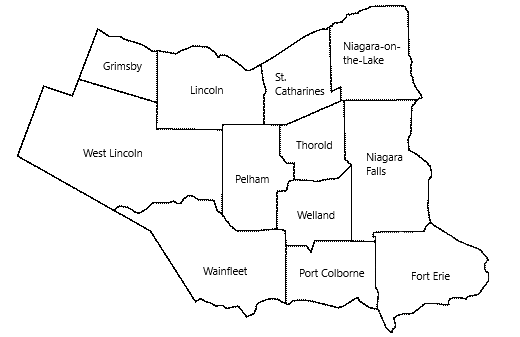
Map of the Regional Municipality of Niagara, showing its component municipalities.

Name	Type	Sub-region	Population
Niagara Falls	City	Welland	94,415
Port Colborne	City	Welland	20,033
St. Catharines	City	Lincoln	136,803
Thorold	City	Welland	23,816
Welland	City	Welland	55,750
Fort Erie	Town	Welland	32,901
Grimsby	Town	Lincoln	28,883
Lincoln	Town	Lincoln	25,719
Niagara-on-the-Lake	Town	Lincoln	19,088
Pelham	Town	Welland	18,192
Wainfleet	Township	Welland	6,887
West Lincoln	Township	Lincoln	15,454

== Demographics ==
As a census division in the 2021 Census of Population conducted by Statistics Canada, the Regional Municipality of Niagara had a population of 477,941 living in 195,914 of its 207,926 total private dwellings, a change of 6.7% from its 2016 population of 447,888. With a land area of 1,852.82 km^{2} (715.38 sq mi), it had a population density of 258.0/km^{2} (668.1/sq mi) in 2021.

Canada census – Regional Municipality of Niagara community profile

	2021	2016	2011
Population	477,941 (+6.7% from 2016)	447,888 (+3.8% from 2011)	431,346 (+0.9% from 2006)
Land area	1,852.82 km^{2} (715.38 sq mi)	1,854.23 km^{2} (715.92 sq mi)	1,854.25 km^{2} (715.93 sq mi)
Population density	258.0/km^{2} (668/sq mi)	241.5/km^{2} (625/sq mi)	232.6/km^{2} (602/sq mi)
Median age	46.0 (M: 44.0, F: 47.2)	45.7 (M: 44.4, F: 46.9)
Private dwellings	207,926 (total) 195,914 (occupied)	196,241 (total)	188,877 (total)
Median household income	$79,000	$65,086

References: 2021 2016 2011

Historical census populations – Regional Municipality of Niagara

Year	Pop.	±%
1971	347,328	—
1976	365,438	+5.2%
1981	368,288	+0.8%
1986	370,132	+0.5%
1991	393,936	+6.4%
1996	403,504	+2.4%

Year	Pop.	±%
2001	410,574	+1.8%
2006	427,421	+4.1%
2011	431,346	+0.9%
2016	447,888	+3.8%
2021	477,941	+6.7%

Source: Statistics Canada

=== Religion ===
Religious profile (2021):

- Christian: 61.0%
  - Catholic: 29.0%
- Muslim: 2.4%
- Hindu: 0.8%
- Buddhist: 0.5%
- Non-religious: 33.9%

=== Ethnicity ===
Panethnic groups in the Regional Municipality of Niagara (2001−2021)
Panethnic group	2021		2016		2011		2006		2001	
Panethnic group	Pop.	%	Pop.	%	Pop.	%	Pop.	%	Pop.	%
European (Note: Statistic includes all persons that did not make up part of a visible minority or an indigenous identity.)	393,100	83.74%	387,095	88.35%	385,785	91.24%	388,415	92.1%	382,050	94.43%
Indigenous	13,960	2.97%	12,250	2.8%	9,055	2.14%	6,930	1.64%	5,185	1.28%
South Asian	13,845	2.95%	6,170	1.41%	3,450	0.82%	3,805	0.9%	2,585	0.64%
African	13,305	2.83%	7,970	1.82%	6,485	1.53%	5,210	1.24%	3,960	0.98%
Southeast Asian (Note: Statistic includes total responses of "Filipino" and "Southeast Asian" under visible minority section on census.)	9,715	2.07%	5,950	1.36%	4,525	1.07%	4,310	1.02%	2,580	0.64%
East Asian (Note: Statistic includes total responses of "Chinese", "Korean", and "Japanese" under visible minority section on census.)	9,365	1.99%	8,230	1.88%	5,835	1.38%	5,570	1.32%	4,370	1.08%
Latin American	6,975	1.49%	4,620	1.05%	3,895	0.92%	4,260	1.01%	1,570	0.39%
Middle Eastern (Note: Statistic includes total responses of "West Asian" and "Arab" under visible minority section on census.)	4,610	0.98%	3,430	0.78%	2,230	0.53%	2,120	0.5%	1,485	0.37%
Other (Note: Statistic includes total responses of "Visible minority, n.i.e." and "Multiple visible minorities" under visible minority section on census.)	4,575	0.97%	2,455	0.56%	1,550	0.37%	1,130	0.27%	810	0.2%
Total responses	469,455	98.22%	438,160	97.83%	422,805	98.02%	421,750	98.67%	404,590	98.54%
Total population	477,941	100%	447,888	100%	431,346	100%	427,421	100%	410,574	100%
Note: Totals greater than 100% due to multiple origin responses

=== Human trafficking ===
The area has a higher concentration of human trafficking compared to other regions in Canada, with 3% of recorded incidents taking place within it. The Niagara Region's proximity to the border and large amounts of hotels are considered to be contributing factors to this issue.

== Transportation ==
=== Airports ===
Niagara Region contains three airports used primarily for general aviation:

- St. Catharines/Niagara District Airport (Niagara-on-the-Lake)
- Welland/Niagara Central Airport (Welland)
- Niagara Falls/Niagara South Airport (Niagara Falls)

Aside from scheduled commuter flights between Niagara District Airport and Toronto City with FlyGTA, for commercial flights Niagara residents use Toronto Pearson International Airport, Billy Bishop Toronto City Airport, or John C. Munro Hamilton International Airport in the Greater Toronto and Hamilton Area; as well as crossing the border to use Buffalo Niagara International Airport or Niagara Falls International Airport in Upstate New York.

=== Public transport ===
Public transit within Niagara Region is provided by Niagara Region Transit, including scheduled local bus service within Niagara Falls, St. Catharines, Thorold and Welland, on-demand transit service in other portions of the Region, and regional bus service between communities in the region.

WEGO is an additional local bus network within Niagara Falls, targeted at visitors rather than residents. The WEGO Green Line is operated by the Niagara Parks Commission and requires separate WEGO tickets, while the remainder of WEGO routes are operated by Niagara Region Transit and accept both Niagara Region Transit and WEGO tickets.

GO Transit provides regional train and bus services from Niagara Falls and St. Catharines to the Greater Toronto and Hamilton Area.

Via Rail serves Grimsby, St. Catharines and Niagara Falls stations as part of the Maple Leaf intercity train between Toronto and New York City, jointly operated with Amtrak.

Many private bus operators operate intercity services to Niagara Region on routes connecting to cities such as Toronto, Buffalo and New York. As of 2023, private bus operators in Niagara Region include Flixbus, Megabus, Equinox, Greyhound, and Trailways.

=== Highways ===
400-series expressways:

- Highway 405
- Highway 406
- Highway 420
- Queen Elizabeth Way (QEW)

Other highways:

- Highway 3
- Highway 20
- Highway 58
- Highway 58A
- Highway 140

== Education ==
- Brock University (St. Catharines)
- University of Niagara Falls (Niagara Falls)
- Conseil Scolaire Viamonde - French Public
- District School Board of Niagara - Public
- Niagara Catholic District School Board - Separate
- Niagara College (Niagara-on-the-Lake, Welland)
- Niagara Parks School of Horticulture (Niagara Falls, Ontario)

== Notable people ==
- Cal Clutterbuck, former NHL player
- Paul Bissonnette, former NHL player
- James Cameron, film director
- Linda Evangelista, fashion supermodel
- Daniel Girardi, former NHL player
- Dallas Green, musician and producer known as "City and Colour"
- Tim Hicks, musician
- Nathan Horton, former NHL player
- Stephan Moccio, Grammy and Academy award-winning musician and composer
- Jordan Nolan, former NHL player
- Daniel Paille, former NHL player
- Neil Peart (1952–2020), drummer for the band Rush
- Laura Secord, heroine of War of 1812
- Joel Thomas Zimmerman, musician known as "Deadmau5"
- Imane Anys, Twitch streamer who goes by the name "Pokimane"

== See also ==
- Lincoln County, Ontario
- Welland County
- List of municipalities in Ontario
- List of townships in Ontario
