= Niagara Falls Transit =

Defunct public transportation authority in Ontario, Canada

- Founded: 1960
- Defunct: 31 December 2022
- Headquarters: 8208 Heartland Forest Road
- Locale: Niagara Falls, Ontario
- Service area: Niagara Falls, Ontario
- Service type: Bus service, Paratransit
- Routes: 14 Monday to Saturday Daytime, 8 Evenings and Sundays and Holidays, and 2 Shuttle Routes
- Hubs: Main & Ferry, Niagara Square, and Morrison & Dorchester
- Stations: Niagara Falls Transit Terminal
- Fleet: 27 conventional buses 6 Handi-Transit vehicles
- Operator: City of Niagara Falls, Ontario
- Website: Niagara Transit

Niagara Falls Transit was a public transit agency that operated the public transport bus services in Niagara Falls, Ontario, Canada between 1960 and 2022.

== History ==
Established in 1960, Niagara Transit originally operated ten routes. In 2007, the operation of Niagara Transit was taken over by the transportation department of the City of Niagara Falls, at which time the agency adopted its present name. A total of 14 regular service, 8 evening/weekend service, and 2 shuttle routes were operated by Niagara Falls Transit. Previously, it also operated two of the three lines of the WEGO network, which replaced the previous Falls Shuttle service.

On January 1, 2023, Niagara Transit assumed the operations of Niagara Falls Transit and started providing local service to Niagara Falls, Welland, Fort Erie, Thorold, and St. Catharines.

== See also ==
- Public transport in Canada
