= Megabus (North America) =

American commercial intercity bus service

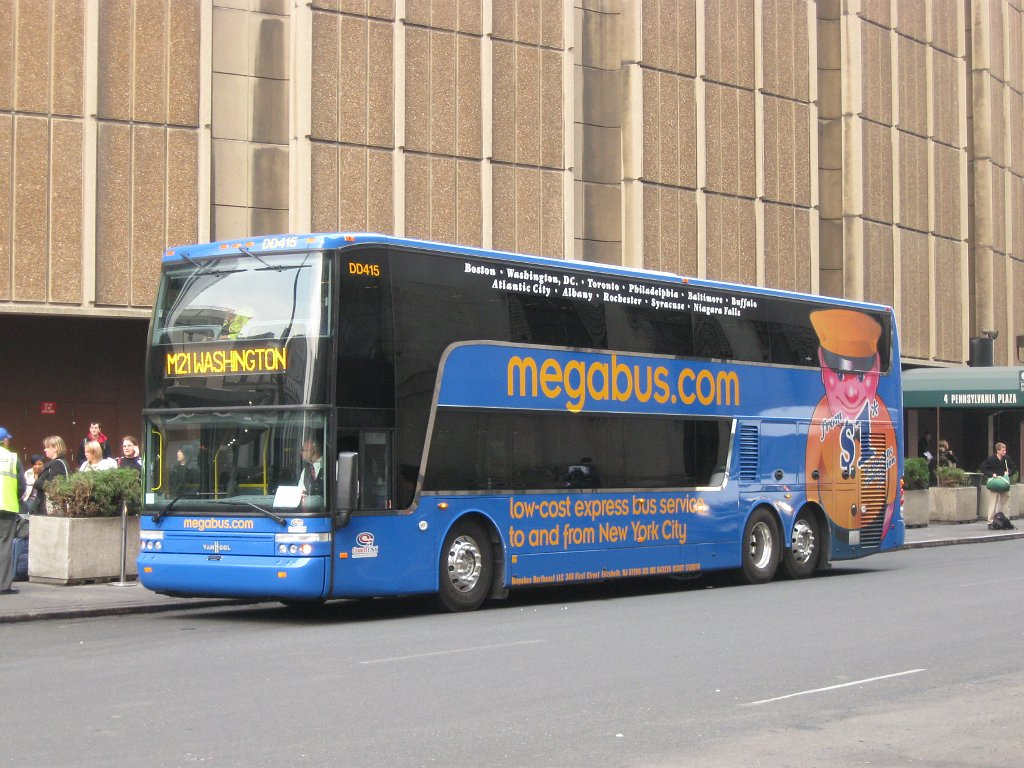
- Van Hool TD925 coach at Penn Station in March 2009
- Parent: Renco Group
- Founded: April 10, 2006; 20 years ago
- Headquarters: U.S.: Elizabeth, New Jersey; Canada: Peterborough, Ontario
- Service area: United States; Canada; Mexico
- Service type: Intercity bus service
- Routes: 30
- Hubs: New York City; Philadelphia 30th Street Station; Pittsburgh; Atlanta; Washington Union Station
- Fleet: Motor Coach Industries single-deck coaches Van Hool single-and double-deck coaches
- Operator: Coach USA
- Chief executive: Derrick Waters
- Website: us.megabus.com ca.megabus.com megabus.mx

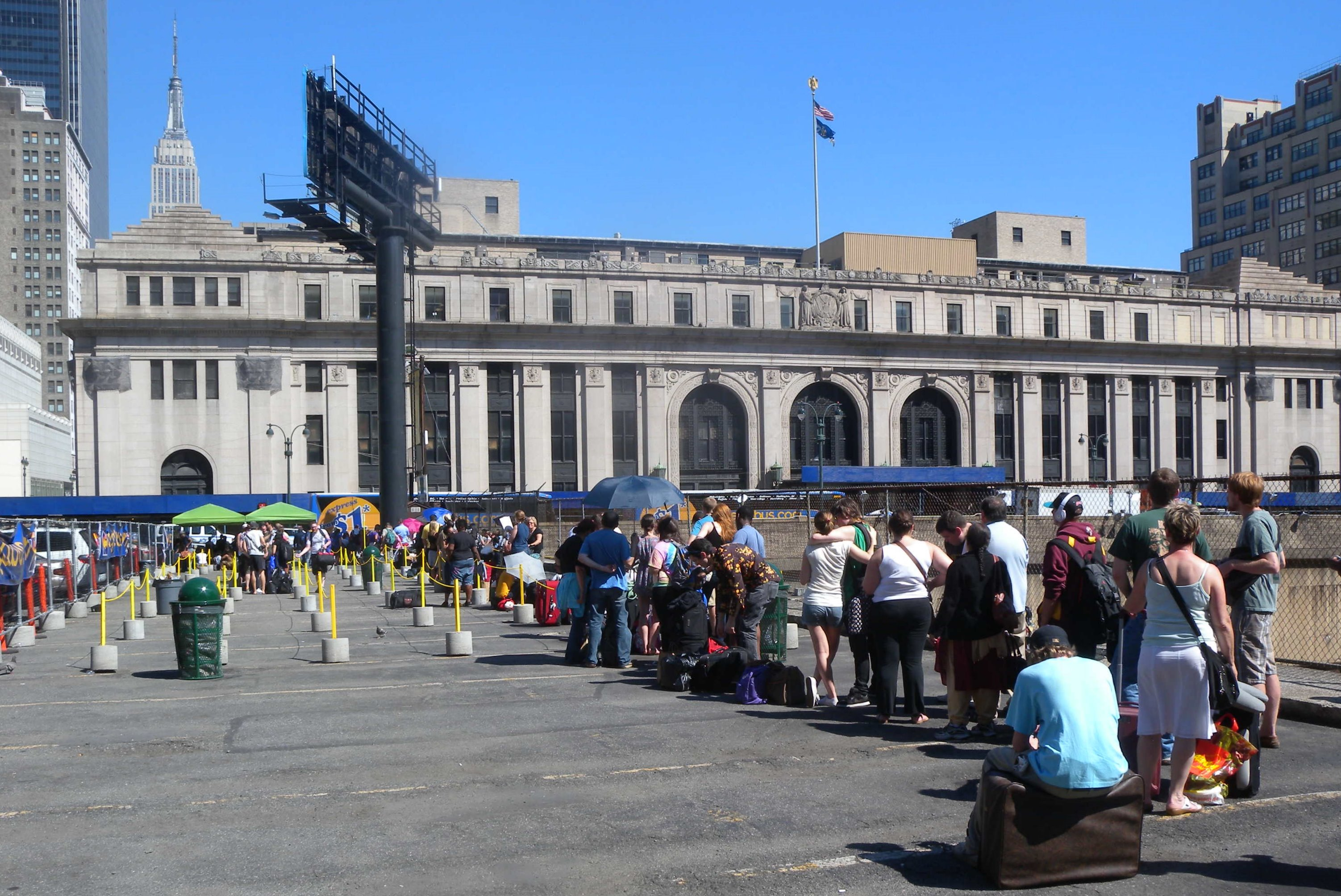
Former station at Ninth Avenue in Manhattan

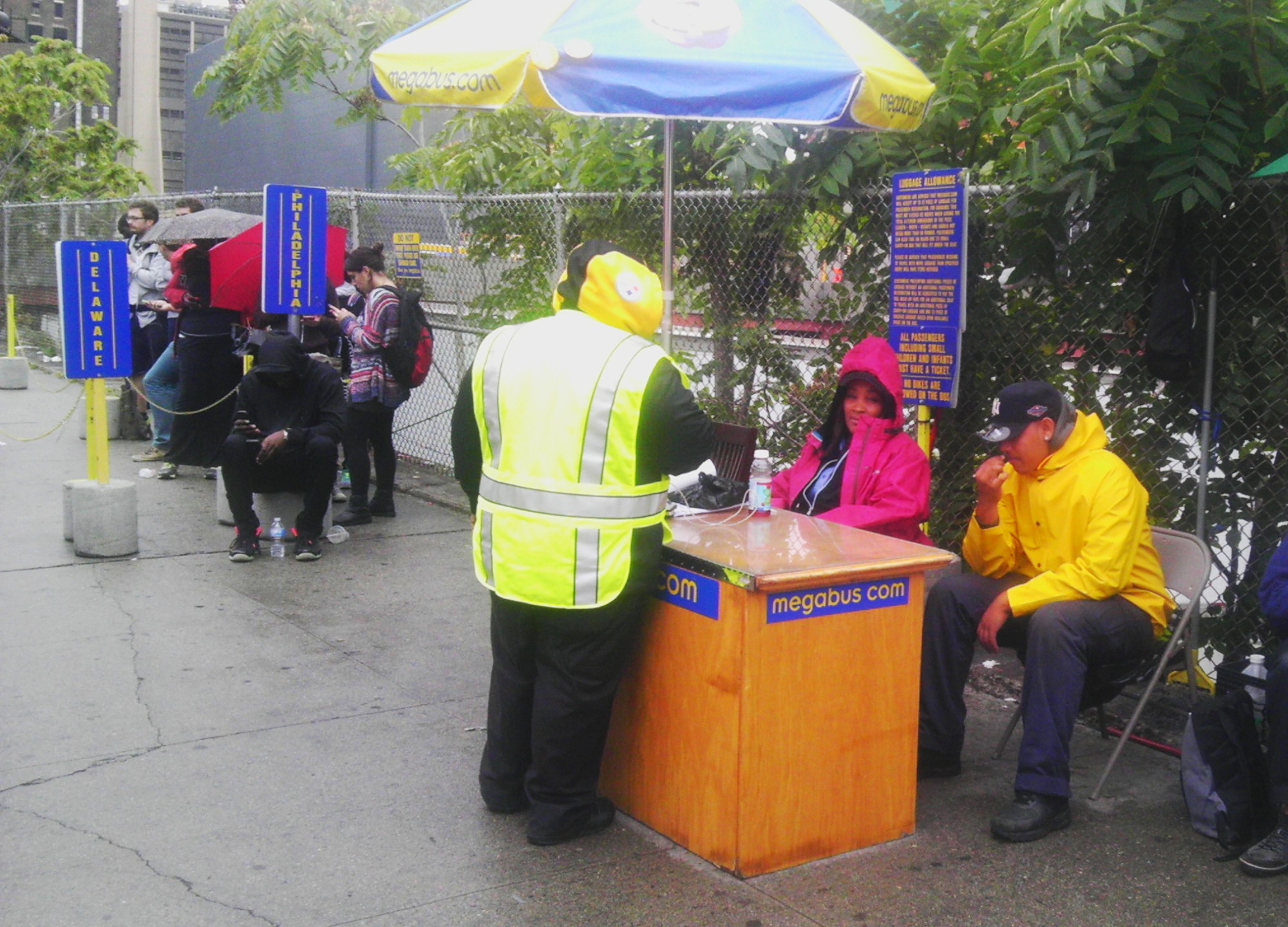
Dispatch desk at 34th Street in Manhattan

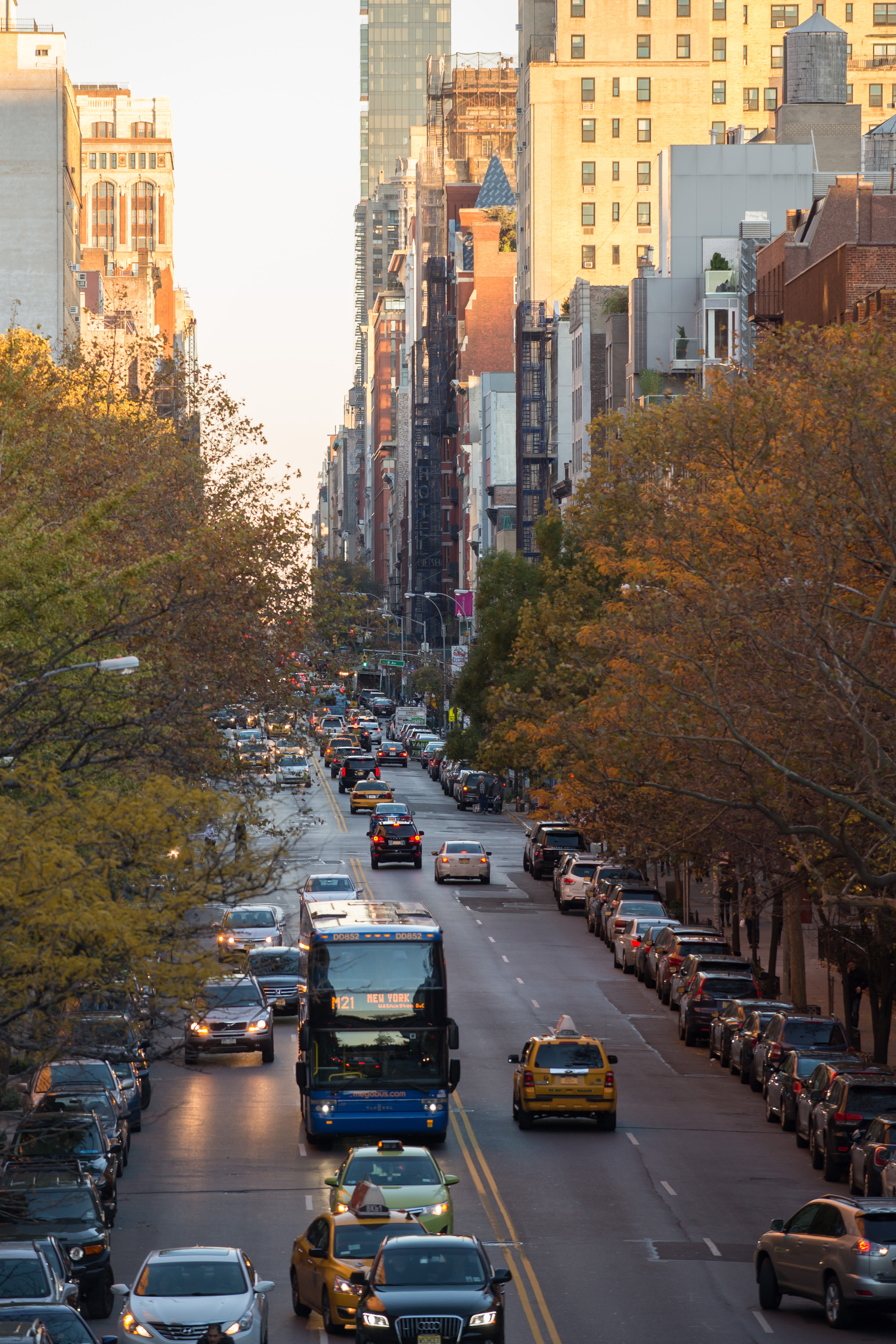
M21 traveling west on 23rd Street in Manhattan

Megabus is an intercity bus service operating in the United States, Canada, and Mexico.

== History ==
Megabus was launched in April 2006 by the UK-based Stagecoach Group through its subsidiary Coach USA. It began in Chicago as its first North American hub on April 10, 2006, initially serving seven Midwestern cities with budget fares and a curbside pickup model. Early adoption was strong; within two years, Megabus had served about one million riders and started investing in new double-decker coaches to expand capacity.

In 2007, Megabus briefly extended service to the West Coast (California and Arizona), but those routes were discontinued in 2008 due to low ridership. Instead, Megabus concentrated on the Midwest and Northeast, launching a New York City hub in May 2008 amid growing demand for curbside bus travel between major eastern cities. By late 2008, Megabus had expanded from its Midwestern base into Pennsylvania, New Jersey, Maryland, Massachusetts and New York.

In August 2009, Stagecoach introduced Megabus in Canada via its Coach Canada division. A $16 million investment launched routes linking Toronto with Kingston and Montreal and soon added cross-border services from Toronto to U.S. cities including New York City, Buffalo, Rochester and Syracuse. The network continued to grow, establishing additional hubs: for example, an Atlanta hub opened in 2011 with routes to 11 cities in the Southeast (from Washington, D.C. down to Florida). Megabus also re-entered California in 2012, opening a hub in Los Angeles, and later a stop in Burbank, to run routes connecting southern California with the Bay Area and Las Vegas.

In 2019, Stagecoach Group sold Coach USA (and Megabus) to a private equity firm, Variant Equity, for $271 million.

In June 2024, Megabus parent company Coach USA filed for Chapter 11 bankruptcy, blaming corporate impact caused by the COVID-19 pandemic. The bankruptcy was later converted to a Chapter 7 bankruptcy liquidation. In August 2024, Peter Pan Bus Lines took over Megabus operations in the Northeastern United States. The company also stopped operating 20 routes in New Jersey; the routes were taken over by New Jersey Transit.

In November 2024, Coach USA (including the Megabus brand and its remaining retail operations) was acquired by affiliates of The Renco Group.

In 2026, Megabus expanded to introduce Megabus Mexico and currently sells tickets between more than 100 cities in Mexico including Mexico City, Tijuana, Guadalajara and Monterrey. Cross border travel between Mexico and the US was also introduced with destinations in Texas, California, Arizona, Nevada and New Mexico.

== Operations ==
In the United States, primary hubs have included Chicago, New York City, Philadelphia, Washington, D.C., Atlanta, Dallas, and Los Angeles. The Canadian network is centered in Toronto, servicing routes into Quebec and cross-border connections to the United States. At its peak operation, the network extended to over 500 destinations across approximately 30 U.S. states and the provinces of Ontario and Quebec. While the majority of stops are located on public streets, certain operations have been integrated into central transit facilities; notably, New York City pickups relocated to the Port Authority Bus Terminal in 2024 under the management of Peter Pan Bus Lines.

To expand service coverage, Megabus has established interline partnerships with regional carriers. In 2022, the company initiated a booking partnership with Trailways of New York. Subsequent agreements with carriers such as Burlington Trailways and Fullington Trailways expanded the network's reach in the Midwest and Appalachia. Under this partnership model, Megabus serves as the ticketing platform while the partner entities operate the specific route segments. In Canada, operations are managed by Coach Canada divisions, including Trentway-Wagar.

== Megabus effect ==
Megabus is often credited with revitalizing intercity bus travel in the United States during the 2000s. The rapid growth of Megabus and similar curbside carriers led industry observers to coin the term the "Megabus effect," referring to the way cheap, tech-enabled bus services stimulated demand and even boosted ridership on competitors like Greyhound.

== Fleet ==
The Megabus North American fleet used to consist of single-deck and double-deck motorcoaches. Initial operations in 2006 utilized 45-foot MCI D4500 series single-level coaches. In late 2007, the company introduced the MCI J4500 single-deck and Van Hool TD925 Astromega double-deck motorcoaches. By 2011, over 100 Van Hool double-deck units were in service across the network.

Operational incidents involving the fleet have included a driver arrest for intoxication in 2008 and fatal collisions in 2010 (Syracuse, New York) and 2012 (Litchfield, Illinois). In 2016, a vehicle fire occurred in Illinois without passenger injury. Two rollover incidents occurred on Interstate 95 in 2022, resulting in injuries near Baltimore and two fatalities on the New Jersey Turnpike.
