= Niagara Transit =

Regional public transportation authority in Ontario, Canada

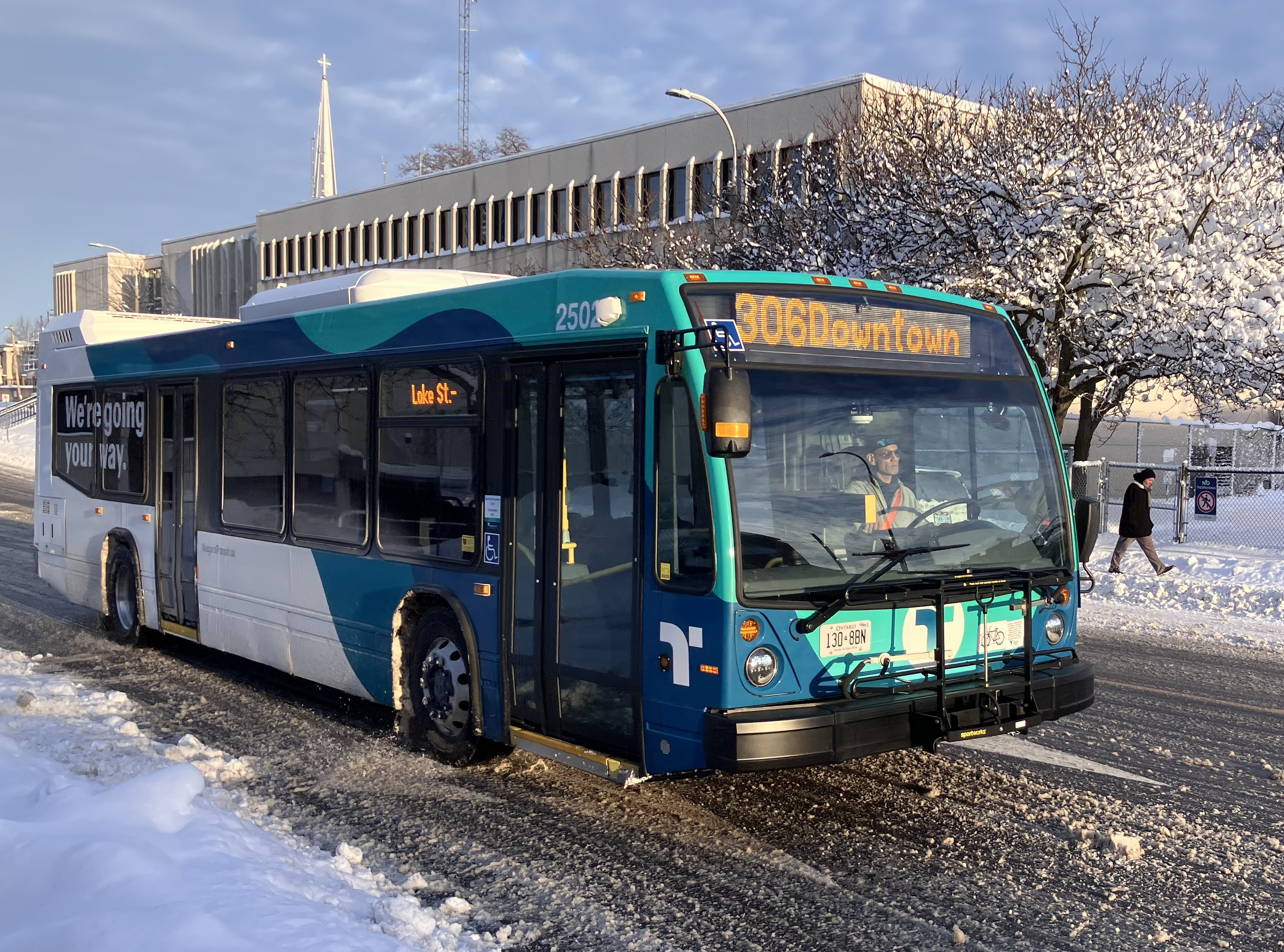
- Niagara Transit bus in St. Catharines
- Parent: Niagara Region
- Founded: 12 September 2011
- Headquarters: 2012 First Street South, St. Catharines, ON, Canada
- Locale: Regional Municipality of Niagara
- Service type: Bus service, Microtransit, Paratransit
- Hubs: Welland Transit Terminal; St. Catharines Transit Terminal; Niagara Falls Transit Morrison-Dorchester Hub; Brock University; Niagara College Welland and Niagara-on-the-Lake campuses
- Fleet: 151
- Annual ridership: 10,900,000 (2024)
- Operator: Niagara Region
- Chief executive: Carla Stout
- Website: nrtransit.ca

Niagara Transit (formerly Niagara Region Transit) is a regional public transit system operating in the Niagara Region of Ontario, Canada. Initial service commenced on September 12, 2011, and consisted solely of inter-municipal routes. In January 2023, Niagara Region Transit assumed the operations of the four local systems within the Region—Welland Transit, Fort Erie Transit, St. Catharines Transit, and Niagara Falls Transit—to form a single unified transit service for both local and intermunicipal trips across Niagara Region.

== History ==
Old logo (2011–2025)

=== Initial intercity-only services ===
Prior to the creation of Niagara Region Transit, inter-municipal transit in the Niagara Region was provided exclusively by local transit agencies which provided inconsistent services between local municipalities such as Welland Transit which operated a "link" route between Welland and Thorold or Niagara Falls Transit which operated a similar route between Fort Erie and Niagara Falls. On September 12, 2011, Niagara Region Transit began operating a network of three routes providing service between Welland, St. Catharines, and Niagara Falls as a temporary pilot project. This plan also included additional funding for existing link services between Niagara Falls and Fort Erie in addition to Welland and Port Colborne.

In March 2017, Niagara's Transportation Master Plan identified a lack of integrated regional transit as being one of the main obstacles preventing regular GO Train service to St. Catharines and Niagara Falls. The master plan proposed merging the services and operations of the region's three largest transit agencies into those of Niagara Region Transit. In December 2021, the plan was approved by the required triple majority as it was supported by a majority of Niagara's municipalities representing a majority of the regional population.

=== Full amalgamation of transit services ===
On January 1, 2023, Niagara Region Transit assumed the operations of Niagara Falls Transit and started providing local service to Niagara Falls, Welland, Fort Erie, Thorold, and St. Catharines. Local passes stopped being sold in December 2022 due to the anticipated consolidation of services. Some fareboxes were replaced in order to use magnetic stripe technology. Fares were unified across municipalities into a single $3 flat fare. Niagara Region Transit has an ageing fleet of buses and significant capital is needed to replace them. In 2023, there was a labour strike by employees.

In 2024, a rebranding to Niagara Transit was approved by the transit commission board. The rebranding was officially launched on March 12, 2025, though rebranded buses have been circulating throughout Welland and Niagara Falls since November 2024.

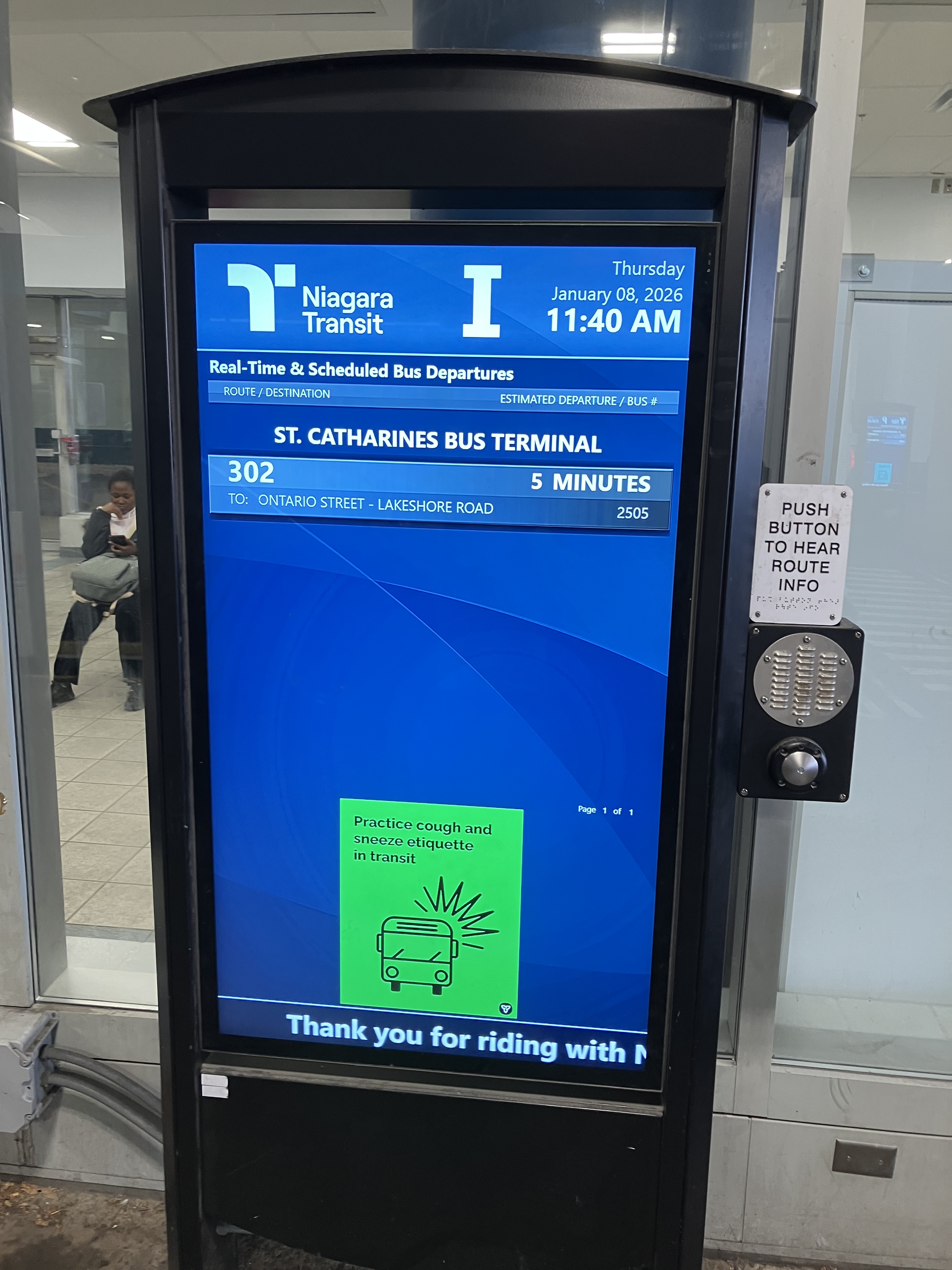
A Niagara Transit Passenger information system at the St. Catharines downtown terminal

== Services ==
=== Buses ===
Niagara Transit operates 99 bus routes. The 11 regional routes are numbered from 1 to 99. Local Niagara Falls routes are numbered 101–199, with weekend-only routes being numbered 201–299. Local St. Catherines and Thorold routes are numbered 301–399 and weekend routes are numbered 401–499. Welland routes are numbered 501–599. These local routes are descended from the three local systems that merged into Niagara Transit in 2023. As of 2024, Niagara Transit has a fleet of 165 buses. All buses have bike racks and are wheelchair accessible.

=== Specialized transit ===
A regional paratransit service, Niagara Specialized Transit, has been in operation since November 2006 and operated by Canadian Red Cross. In August 2020, a two-year pilot was launched to provide on-demand service for Grimsby, Lincoln, Pelham, Wainfleet and West Lincoln.

=== Microtransit ===
In 2024, NRT OnDemand services were transferred to Voyago and replaced previous local specialized transit services which were under contract to Via Mobility and BTS Network. In July 2025, fares will be changed to flat fare of $3.50 for both local and intercity trips.

== Fares ==
As of July 1, 2025, single fares are $3.50 for all ages, across local and regional routes. Previously, local trips costed $3 and intercity trip costed $6, including transfer between two local municipal transit services. Niagara Transit does not sell day passes, but offers 10-ride and 31-day Regional passes.

== Governance ==
Niagara Transit is governed by a board of regional and local municipal councillors established by the Niagara Regional Council.

== Gallery ==
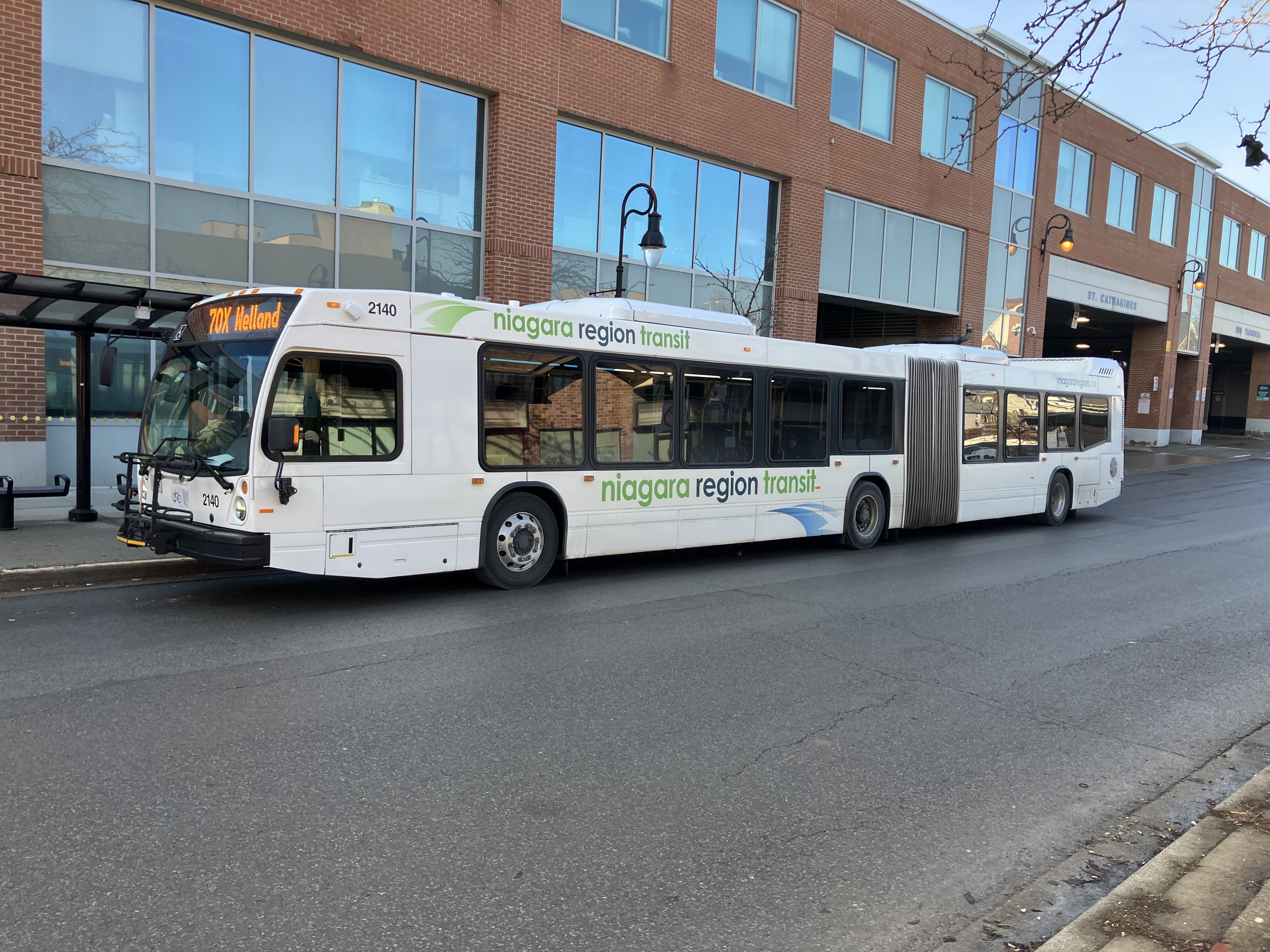
An articulated nova bus operated by Niagara Transit

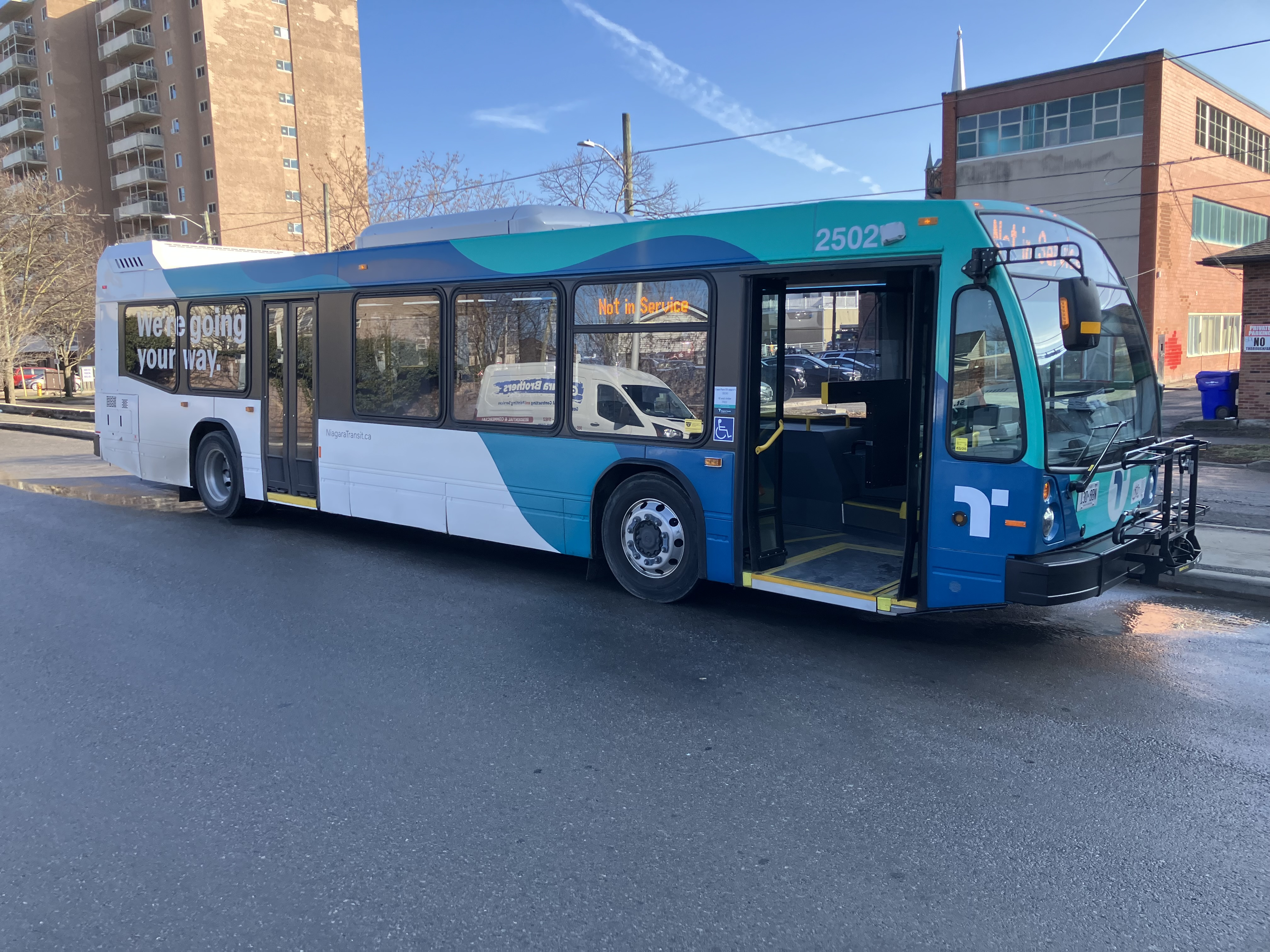
An out-of-service Niagara Transit bus

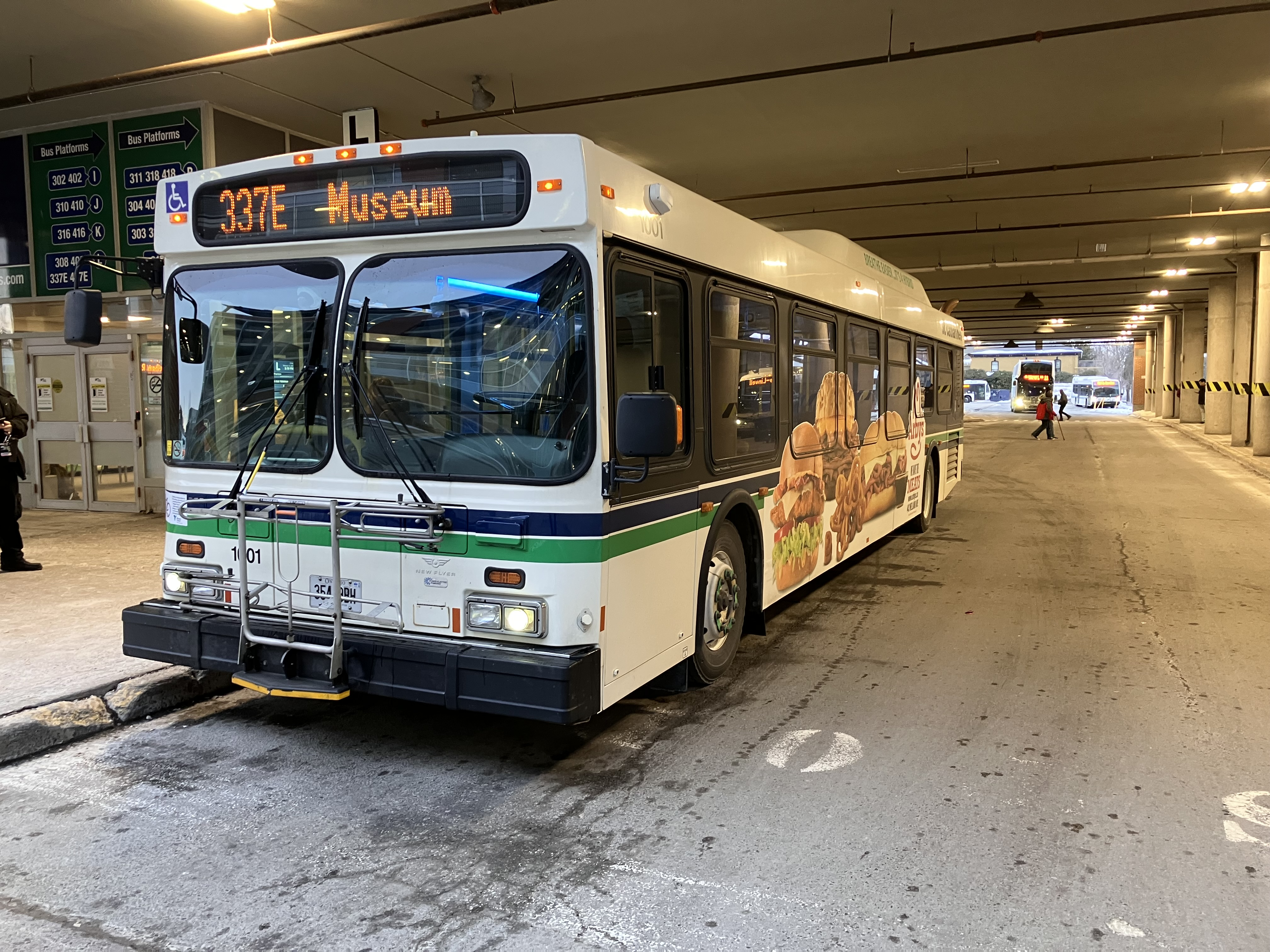
An older New Flyer Low Floor operated by Niagara Transit in 2026
