= Coach Canada =

Intercity motor coach service for Canada

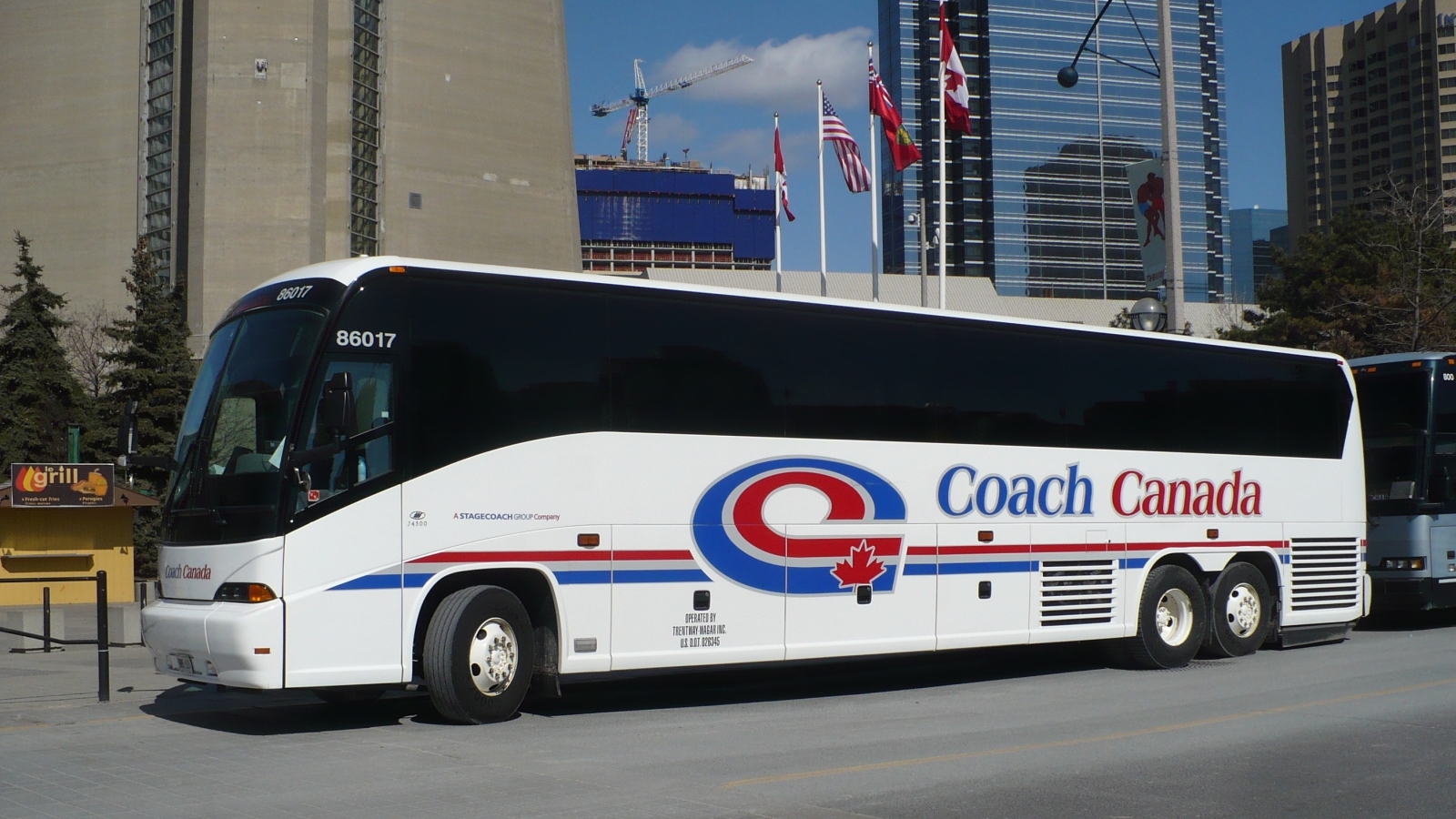
- Parent: Variant Equity Advisors
- Founded: 1999
- Headquarters: 2015 Fisher Drive; Peterborough, Ontario
- Service area: Quebec and Ontario, Canada
- Service type: Intercity coach service Tour bus Bus charter Contract service
- Alliance: Coach USA
- Website: www.coachcanada.com

Coach Canada is the Canadian affiliate of Coach USA. Coach USA has been owned by Renco Group since 2024.

Charter services (rental of bus with driver) originating in most areas in Ontario can travel to anywhere in North America. However, Megabus operations are confined to the provinces of Quebec and Ontario and provide services under the Megabus brand in the main centres such as Toronto, Montreal, Kingston, and Niagara Falls. Coach Canada is mainly a mix of scheduled services, charter operations, and sightseeing tour operations. Coach Canada was included in the April 2019 disposal by Stagecoach of its North American operations to Variant Equity Advisors.

== Operators ==
Approval under the Investment Canada Act was given to Stagecoach in October 1999, to acquire Erie Coach Lines of London, Autocar Connaisseur Inc., of Montréal and Trentway-Wagar of Peterborough, which became the core of their Canadian operations today.

Gray Line Montreal, although also owned by Coach Canada, is independently operated.

== Scheduled bus services ==
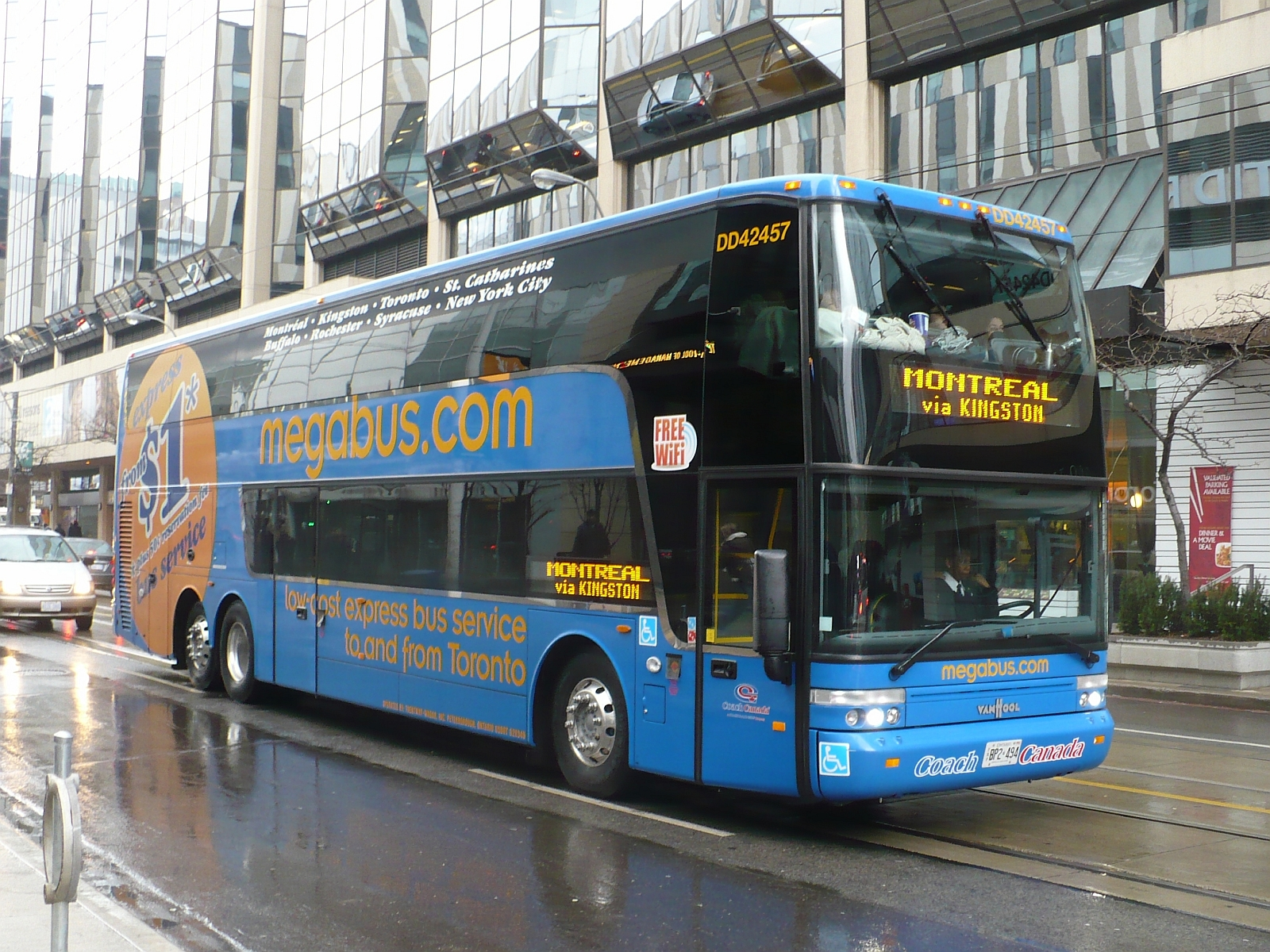
Coach Canada operates Megabus service between Toronto, Montreal and Niagara Falls. A Van Hool double-decker bus is shown

Scheduled services (as Megabus):

- Toronto / Scarborough / Kingston / Brockville / Cornwall / Kirkland / Montreal
- Kingston / Brockville / Ottawa
- Toronto / St. Catharines / Niagara Falls
- Toronto Airport / Port Hope / Trenton / Belleville / Napanee / Kingston
- Mississauga / Toronto Airport / Toronto-Yorkdale / Queen's University

== Public transit operations ==
- Coach Canada no longer operates municipal transit. It previously held contracts with Durham Region Transit and Cobourg/Port Hope Transit, however those contracts were not renewed.

== Carpool litigation ==
Trentway-Wagar won a legal battle in Ontario on 12 November 2008. The company had alleged that PickupPal, an online carpool matching service, was violating Ontario safety laws. PickupPal was ordered to pay $2,836.07 CAN to the Ontario government and $8,500.00 CAN to Trentway-Wagar for the violation of these laws.

Trentway-Wagar received criticism for its litigation against PickupPal, leading to cancellations by clients and prompting politicians to introduce new legislation that is more prepared to deal with emerging businesses like PickupPal.

On 24 April 2009 the Ontario Government amended the Public Vehicle Act to remove any mention of carpool vehicles, thus essentially removing any legal barriers preventing carpooling in Ontario.

== See also ==
- Bus companies in Ontario
