= Vineland, Ontario =

Vineland
- Unincorporated Community
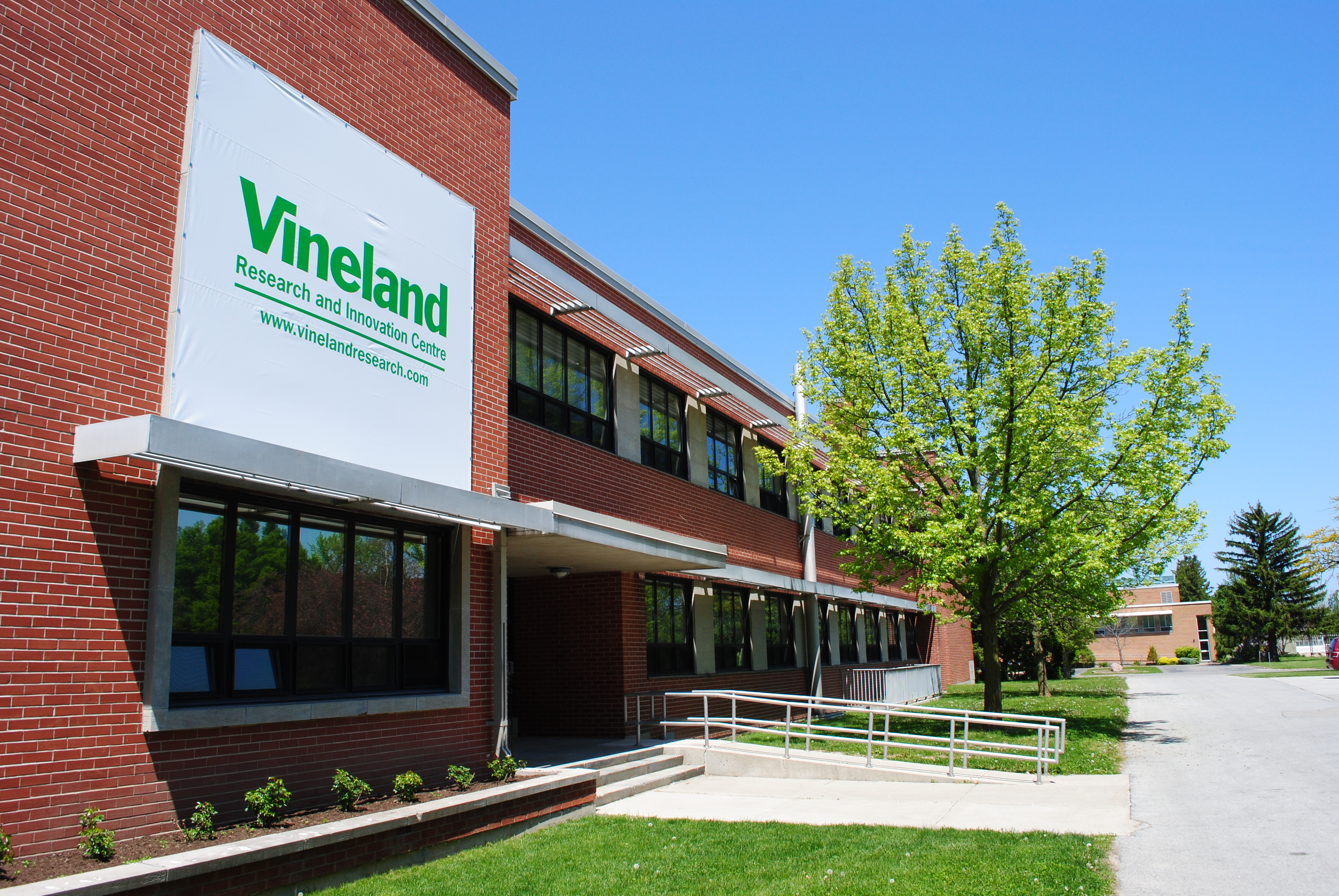
- The Vineland Research and Innovation Centre in Vineland, Ontario

- Location of Vineland in Ontario Vineland (Southern Ontario)
- Coordinates: 43°9′14″N 79°23′32″W
- Country: Canada
- Province: Ontario
- Regional Municipality: Niagara
- Town: Lincoln
- First Settled: 1786

Government
  - Governing Body: Town of Lincoln Council
  - MP: Dean Allison (CPC)
  - MPP: Sam Oosterhoff (PC)

Area
  - Land: 5.80 km^{2} (2.24 sq mi)
- Elevation: 94.5 m (310 ft)

Population (2021)
  - Total: 4,260
  - Density: 757.7/km^{2} (1,962/sq mi)
- Time zone: UTC-5 (EST)
  - Summer (DST): UTC-4 (EDT)
- Forward sortation area: L0R 2C0
- Area codes: 905 and 289
- NTS Map: 030M03
- GNBC Code: FDABE

Vineland is an unincorporated community within the Town of Lincoln in Niagara Region. Located in the Canadian province of Ontario. It is bordered by the Twenty Mile Creek and Jordan to the east, Lake Ontario to the north, Beamsville to the west and Pelham to the south.

Vineland is primarily an agricultural community and is home to many tender fruit farms and wineries. As the second-largest community in the Town of Lincoln, Vineland's small commercial centre along King Street serves the surrounding communities of Campden and Jordan. The post office was established in 1894.

== Agriculture ==
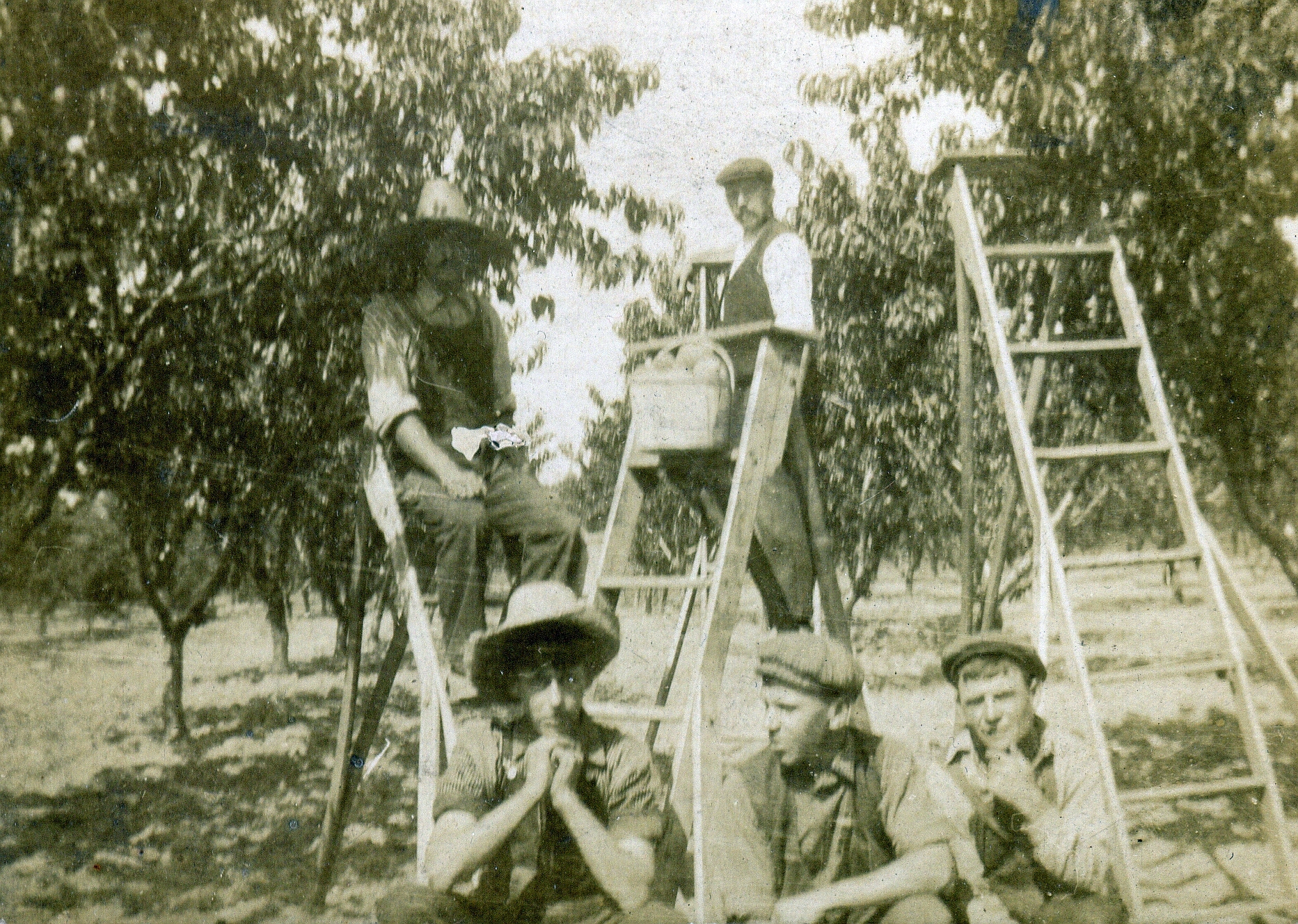
Peach-pickers in Vineland, 1912

Its location between the southern shore of Lake Ontario and the Niagara Escarpment provides for a moderate climate with mild winters. Vineland and the surrounding area is known in Canada for its orchards, vineyards, wineries and restaurants that feature local produce and wines. There are also a large number of greenhouses and farms in the vicinity that are a major economic driver. Vineland's fruit crops include cherries, peaches, apples and pears. The area is recognized as Canada's premier tender fruit region; research on growing tender fruits in Canada is centred at the Vineland Research and Innovation Centre.

== Attractions ==
Vineland hosts a large craft fair that takes place on Canadian Thanksgiving weekend. The festival is hosted on the Twenty Valley Public School grounds, and a portion of the funds go to maintaining the school. Craft stalls are set up on the school grounds, the main street, Victoria Avenue, and at the Ball's Falls Conservation Area. This festival also extends into the ball park in neighbouring town of Jordan.

The First Mennonite Church in Vineland, adjacent to the cemetery at the corner of Regional Road 81 (former Highway 8) and Martin Road, organized in 1801, is the oldest Mennonite congregation in Canada.

Vineland is known for its local fruit markets and roadside stands, supplying locally grown produce.

== Climate ==
Vineland's climate is humid continental (Köppen borderline Dfa/Dfb) and can be considered a unique micro-climate due to the influences that Lake Ontario, Lake Erie, Jordan Harbour and the Niagara Escarpment have on sheltering the area from harsh weather. The two lakes and harbour have a moderating effecting on the local weather, keeping Vineland cooler in the summer and warmer in the winter. The area is known in Canada for its orchards, vineyards, wineries and restaurants that feature local produce and wines. Fruit crops grown in Vineland include cherries, peaches, apples, strawberries and pears. During the summer, the orchards and fields attract many tourists from all over Ontario, particularly Toronto.

Climate data for Vineland Rittenhouse (1991−2020 normals, extremes 1901–present)
| Month | Jan | Feb | Mar | Apr | May | Jun | Jul | Aug | Sep | Oct | Nov | Dec | Year |
|---|---|---|---|---|---|---|---|---|---|---|---|---|---|
| Record high °C (°F) | 20.0 (68.0) | 19.4 (66.9) | 27.0 (80.6) | 32.2 (90.0) | 34.0 (93.2) | 36.7 (98.1) | 39.4 (102.9) | 39.4 (102.9) | 36.7 (98.1) | 31.9 (89.4) | 27.2 (81.0) | 21.5 (70.7) | 39.4 (102.9) |
| Mean daily maximum °C (°F) | 0.2 (32.4) | 0.8 (33.4) | 5.3 (41.5) | 11.6 (52.9) | 18.6 (65.5) | 24.1 (75.4) | 27.1 (80.8) | 26.1 (79.0) | 22.3 (72.1) | 15.5 (59.9) | 8.9 (48.0) | 3.2 (37.8) | 13.6 (56.5) |
| Daily mean °C (°F) | −3.3 (26.1) | −2.9 (26.8) | 1.4 (34.5) | 7.0 (44.6) | 13.3 (55.9) | 19.1 (66.4) | 22.2 (72.0) | 21.4 (70.5) | 17.6 (63.7) | 11.3 (52.3) | 5.2 (41.4) | 0.1 (32.2) | 9.4 (48.9) |
| Mean daily minimum °C (°F) | −6.8 (19.8) | −6.4 (20.5) | −2.6 (27.3) | 2.4 (36.3) | 8.0 (46.4) | 14.0 (57.2) | 17.2 (63.0) | 16.6 (61.9) | 12.9 (55.2) | 7.1 (44.8) | 1.5 (34.7) | −3 (27) | 5.1 (41.2) |
| Record low °C (°F) | −25 (−13) | −25.6 (−14.1) | −19.5 (−3.1) | −15 (5) | −3.3 (26.1) | 1.7 (35.1) | 6.1 (43.0) | 3.3 (37.9) | −0.6 (30.9) | −6.7 (19.9) | −14.4 (6.1) | −24.5 (−12.1) | −25.6 (−14.1) |
| Average precipitation mm (inches) | 71.1 (2.80) | 52.4 (2.06) | 62.1 (2.44) | 82.8 (3.26) | 69.8 (2.75) | 78.1 (3.07) | 74.2 (2.92) | 68.7 (2.70) | 68.7 (2.70) | 76.7 (3.02) | 71.8 (2.83) | 61.6 (2.43) | 838.0 (32.99) |
| Average rainfall mm (inches) | 32.1 (1.26) | 33.4 (1.31) | 43.5 (1.71) | 69.6 (2.74) | 75.6 (2.98) | 81.0 (3.19) | 85.1 (3.35) | 75.2 (2.96) | 83.5 (3.29) | 74.0 (2.91) | 79.3 (3.12) | 47.2 (1.86) | 779.4 (30.69) |
| Average snowfall cm (inches) | 32.2 (12.7) | 23.7 (9.3) | 21.5 (8.5) | 4.4 (1.7) | 0.8 (0.3) | 0.0 (0.0) | 0.0 (0.0) | 0.0 (0.0) | 0.0 (0.0) | 0.1 (0.0) | 6.6 (2.6) | 22.9 (9.0) | 112.2 (44.2) |
| Average precipitation days (≥ 0.2 mm) | 18.1 | 13.0 | 13.4 | 13.5 | 12.6 | 12.0 | 11.3 | 11.1 | 10.9 | 13.3 | 13.4 | 14.9 | 157.5 |
| Average rainy days (≥ 0.2 mm) | 7.1 | 6.6 | 9.7 | 13.8 | 12.9 | 12.2 | 11.6 | 11.2 | 12.9 | 12.9 | 14.0 | 9.9 | 134.8 |
| Average snowy days (≥ 0.2 cm) | 10.5 | 7.1 | 5.2 | 1.4 | 0.14 | 0.0 | 0.0 | 0.0 | 0.0 | 0.05 | 2.3 | 7.5 | 34.3 |
| Average relative humidity (%) (at 15:00) | 67.3 | 65.7 | 63.3 | 61.7 | 61.5 | 60.7 | 57.9 | 59.1 | 61.3 | 64.4 | 65.3 | 69.5 | 63.1 |
| Mean monthly sunshine hours | 88.9 | 97.3 | 144.8 | 180.6 | 229.7 | 263.9 | 286.4 | 246.1 | 176.6 | 143.1 | 83.3 | 64.2 | 2,005 |
| Percentage possible sunshine | 30.6 | 32.9 | 39.2 | 45.0 | 50.6 | 57.4 | 61.5 | 56.9 | 47.0 | 41.7 | 28.5 | 22.9 | 42.8 |
Source: Environment Canada (rain/snowfall 1981–2010, sunshine recorded at Vineland Station, 1971–2000)

== Notable people ==
- Samuel F. Coffman (1872–1954), anti-war activist
- Kevin Rempel, Paralympian
