= Jordan, Ontario =

Jordan
- Unincorporated community
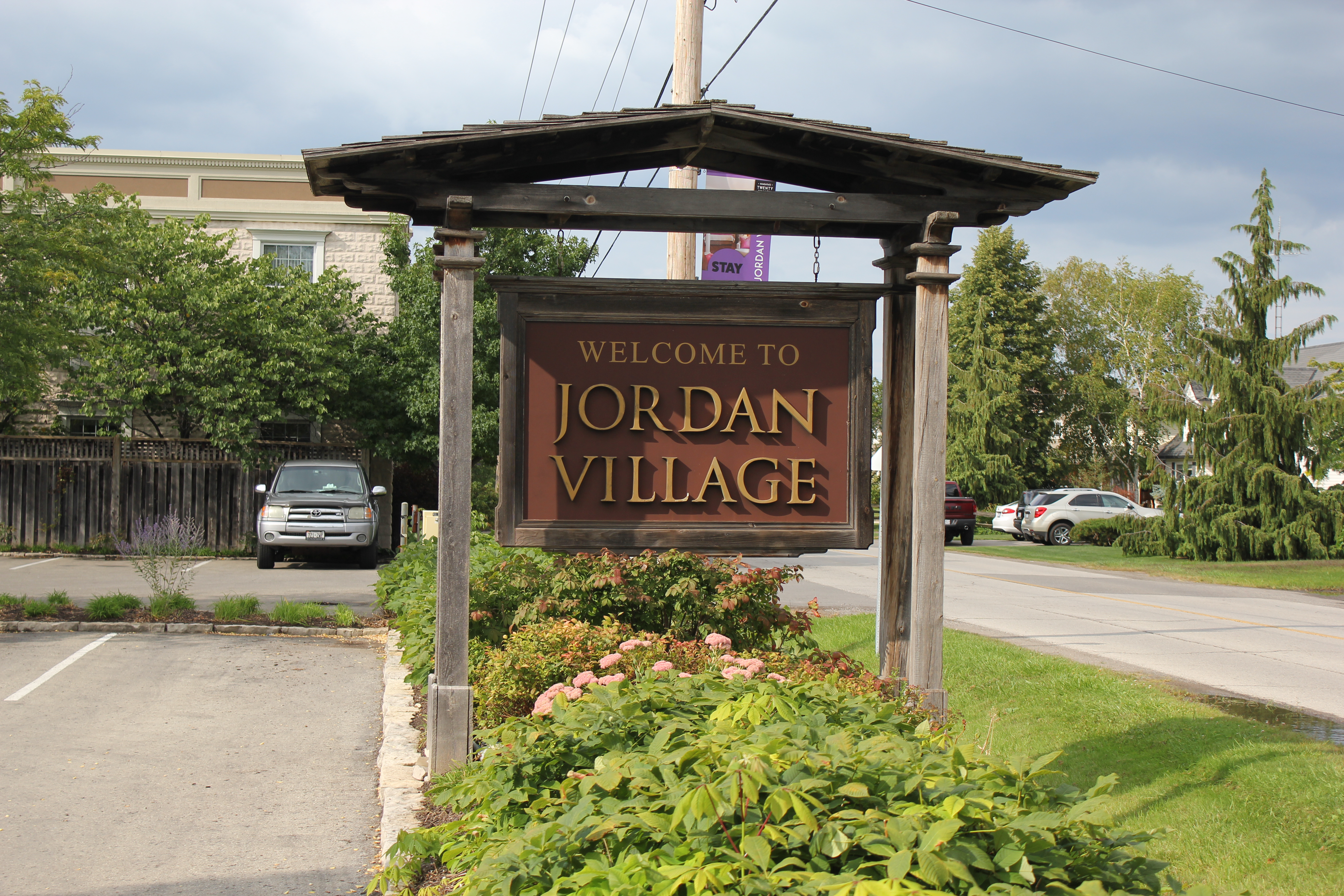
- Jordan Village

- Location within Ontario
- Coordinates: 43°08′N 79°21′W
- Country: Canada
- Province: Ontario
- Regional Municipality: Niagara
- Settled: Late 1700s

Government
  - Governing Body: Town of Lincoln Council
  - MP: Dean Allison (CPC)
  - MPP: Sam Oosterhoff (OPC)
- Time zone: UTC-5 (EST)
  - Summer (DST): UTC-4 (EDT)
- Postal code span: L0R
- Area code: 905

Jordan is a community located on the eastern edge of the Town of Lincoln, in the Niagara Region. Jordan is bordered by the Twenty Mile Creek and Vineland to the west, Lake Ontario to the north, St. Catharines to the east, and Pelham to the south. Lying roughly 100 km from Toronto and 65 km from Buffalo by road, Jordan is located along a major transportation corridor between Canada and the United States. In January 2014, Jordan was brought to international attention when Al-Qaeda-directed terrorists were arrested for plotting to derail a passenger train traveling from Toronto to New York on a rail-bridge crossing the Jordan Harbour.

Jordan is home to many wineries due to its climatically advantageous grape-growing conditions in the Niagara Region, and is one of the premier icewine-producing destinations in Canada. Also located in Jordan is the Ball's Falls Conservation Area, which is maintained by the Niagara Peninsula Conservation Authority, and the home of the second-tallest waterfall in the Niagara Region.

== Geography ==
Jordan's climate is humid continental (Köppen borderline Dfa/Dfb) and can be considered a unique micro-climate because of the moderating influence of Lake Ontario/Lake Erie and the sheltering effect of the Niagara Escarpment. The area is known in Canada for its orchards, vineyards, wineries and restaurants that feature local produce and wines. Fruit crops grown in Jordan include cherries, peaches, apples and pears, and during the summer attract many tourists from all over Ontario, particularly Toronto.

=== Climate ===
Climate data for Vineland Rittenhouse (1991−2020 normals, extremes 1901–present)
Month	Jan	Feb	Mar	Apr	May	Jun	Jul	Aug	Sep	Oct	Nov	Dec	Year
Record high °C (°F)	20.0 (68.0)	19.4 (66.9)	27.0 (80.6)	32.2 (90.0)	34.0 (93.2)	36.7 (98.1)	39.4 (102.9)	39.4 (102.9)	36.7 (98.1)	31.9 (89.4)	27.2 (81.0)	21.5 (70.7)	39.4 (102.9)
Mean daily maximum °C (°F)	0.2 (32.4)	0.8 (33.4)	5.3 (41.5)	11.6 (52.9)	18.6 (65.5)	24.1 (75.4)	27.1 (80.8)	26.1 (79.0)	22.3 (72.1)	15.5 (59.9)	8.9 (48.0)	3.2 (37.8)	13.6 (56.5)
Daily mean °C (°F)	−3.3 (26.1)	−2.9 (26.8)	1.4 (34.5)	7.0 (44.6)	13.3 (55.9)	19.1 (66.4)	22.2 (72.0)	21.4 (70.5)	17.6 (63.7)	11.3 (52.3)	5.2 (41.4)	0.1 (32.2)	9.4 (48.9)
Mean daily minimum °C (°F)	−6.8 (19.8)	−6.4 (20.5)	−2.6 (27.3)	2.4 (36.3)	8.0 (46.4)	14.0 (57.2)	17.2 (63.0)	16.6 (61.9)	12.9 (55.2)	7.1 (44.8)	1.5 (34.7)	−3 (27)	5.1 (41.2)
Record low °C (°F)	−25 (−13)	−25.6 (−14.1)	−19.5 (−3.1)	−15 (5)	−3.3 (26.1)	1.7 (35.1)	6.1 (43.0)	3.3 (37.9)	−0.6 (30.9)	−6.7 (19.9)	−14.4 (6.1)	−24.5 (−12.1)	−25.6 (−14.1)
Average precipitation mm (inches)	71.1 (2.80)	52.4 (2.06)	62.1 (2.44)	82.8 (3.26)	69.8 (2.75)	78.1 (3.07)	74.2 (2.92)	68.7 (2.70)	68.7 (2.70)	76.7 (3.02)	71.8 (2.83)	61.6 (2.43)	838.0 (32.99)
Average rainfall mm (inches)	32.1 (1.26)	33.4 (1.31)	43.5 (1.71)	69.6 (2.74)	75.6 (2.98)	81.0 (3.19)	85.1 (3.35)	75.2 (2.96)	83.5 (3.29)	74.0 (2.91)	79.3 (3.12)	47.2 (1.86)	779.4 (30.69)
Average snowfall cm (inches)	32.2 (12.7)	23.7 (9.3)	21.5 (8.5)	4.4 (1.7)	0.8 (0.3)	0.0 (0.0)	0.0 (0.0)	0.0 (0.0)	0.0 (0.0)	0.1 (0.0)	6.6 (2.6)	22.9 (9.0)	112.2 (44.2)
Average precipitation days (≥ 0.2 mm)	18.1	13.0	13.4	13.5	12.6	12.0	11.3	11.1	10.9	13.3	13.4	14.9	157.5
Average rainy days (≥ 0.2 mm)	7.1	6.6	9.7	13.8	12.9	12.2	11.6	11.2	12.9	12.9	14.0	9.9	134.8
Average snowy days (≥ 0.2 cm)	10.5	7.1	5.2	1.4	0.14	0.0	0.0	0.0	0.0	0.05	2.3	7.5	34.3
Average relative humidity (%) (at 15:00)	67.3	65.7	63.3	61.7	61.5	60.7	57.9	59.1	61.3	64.4	65.3	69.5	63.1
Mean monthly sunshine hours	88.9	97.3	144.8	180.6	229.7	263.9	286.4	246.1	176.6	143.1	83.3	64.2	2,005
Percentage possible sunshine	30.6	32.9	39.2	45.0	50.6	57.4	61.5	56.9	47.0	41.7	28.5	22.9	42.8
Source: Environment Canada (rain/snowfall 1981–2010, sunshine recorded at Vineland Station, 1971–2000)

== History ==
Most of the early settlers were German in origin, and were devout practising Mennonites. These Mennonites (Pennsylvania Dutch) walked north from the United States in 1799, and founded the villages of Jordan and Vineland. An Ontario Historical Plaque was erected at the Lincoln Museum and Cultural Centre in Jordan by the province to commemorate the first Mennonite Settlement's role in Ontario's heritage. The First Mennonite Church in Vineland, adjacent to the cemetery at the corner of Regional Road 81 (former Highway 8) and Martin Road, organized in 1801, is the oldest Mennonite congregation in Canada.

With a large natural harbour at the mouth of Twenty Creek, Jordan became a busy shipping centre for the export of logs for boat masts, tan bark, hides, ashes used in industrial centres for the manufacture of soap, as well as grain, flour, fruit and fruit products. A small shipbuilding industry existed for a time on the banks of the Twenty.

Jordan became part of The Town of Lincoln on January 1, 1970, as the result of a municipal corporation created by the Legislature of Ontario through the amalgamation of the Town of Beamsville, the Township of Clinton, and approximately half the Township of Louth.

== Education ==
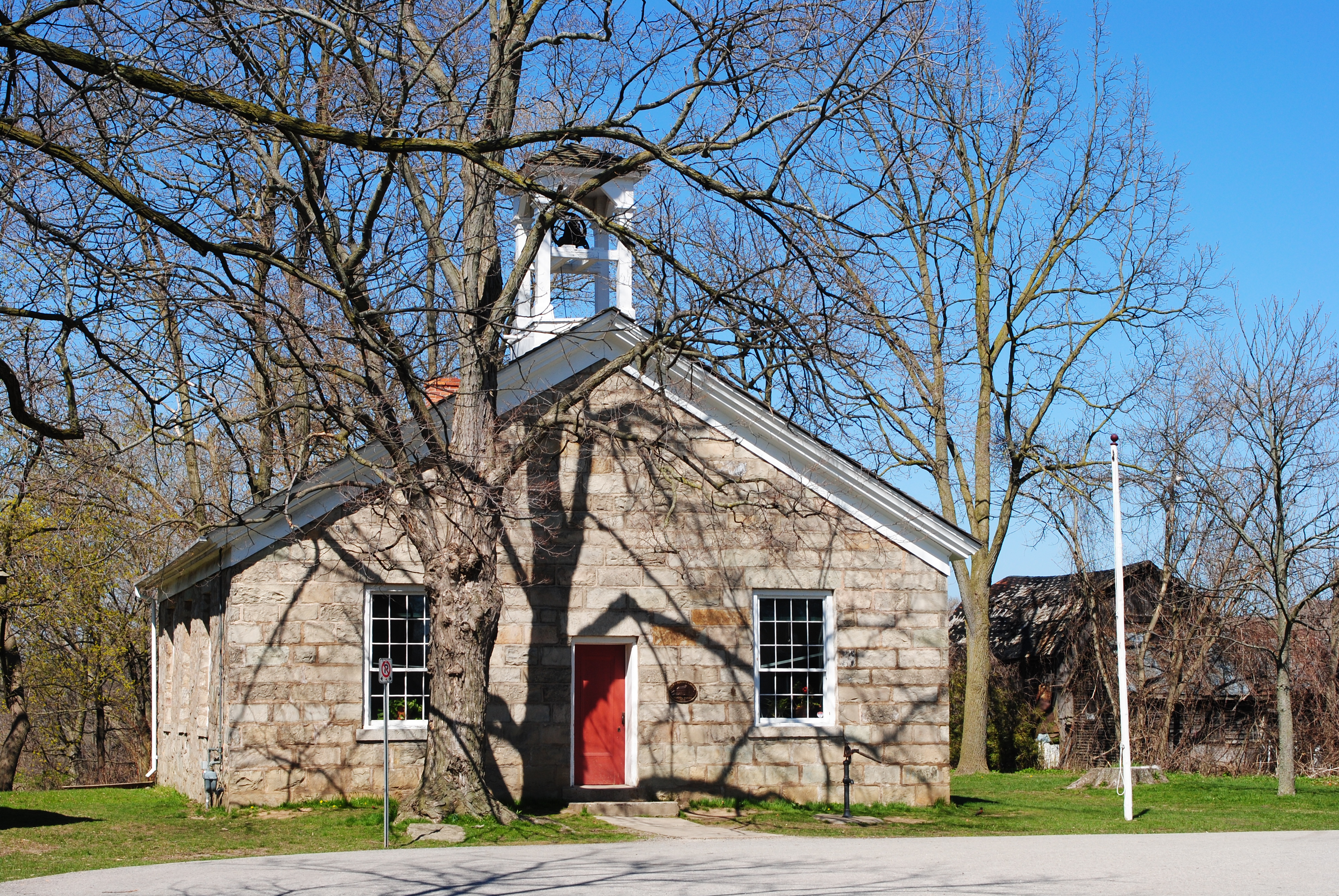
Old Jordan School House

There are three schools located in Jordan. The oldest, Jordan Christian School (JCS), is a private JK-12 school, nestled amongst vineyards and orchards on Fifteenth St. Saint Edward Catholic School is a Catholic JK-8 school. Heritage Christian School is a private K-12 school accredited by the Niagara Reformed Christian Education Association.

=== Jordan Christian School ===
JCS was founded in 1984 and currently offers Junior Kindergarten to Grade 12. The school carries a rich history, both as Jordan Christian School and formerly as Jordan Station Public School.

=== St. Edward Catholic School ===
St. Edward Catholic School is a Junior Kindergarten to Grade 8 publicly funded Catholic school located in Jordan. The original school, housing six classrooms and a small office, was constructed in 1963. A gymnasium, changerooms, three additional classrooms, and a resource office were added in 1967. A renovation in 1995 added two Primary classrooms to the front of the school. The school draws students from both Jordan and neighbouring Vineland.

=== Heritage Christian School ===
Heritage is a parental school governed by a board of directors elected by the members of the Niagara Reformed Christian Education Association (NRCEA), offering Kindergarten to Grade 12 education. It opened its doors in 1992, and currently has an enrollment of about 700 students, and 60 staff members.

== Attractions ==
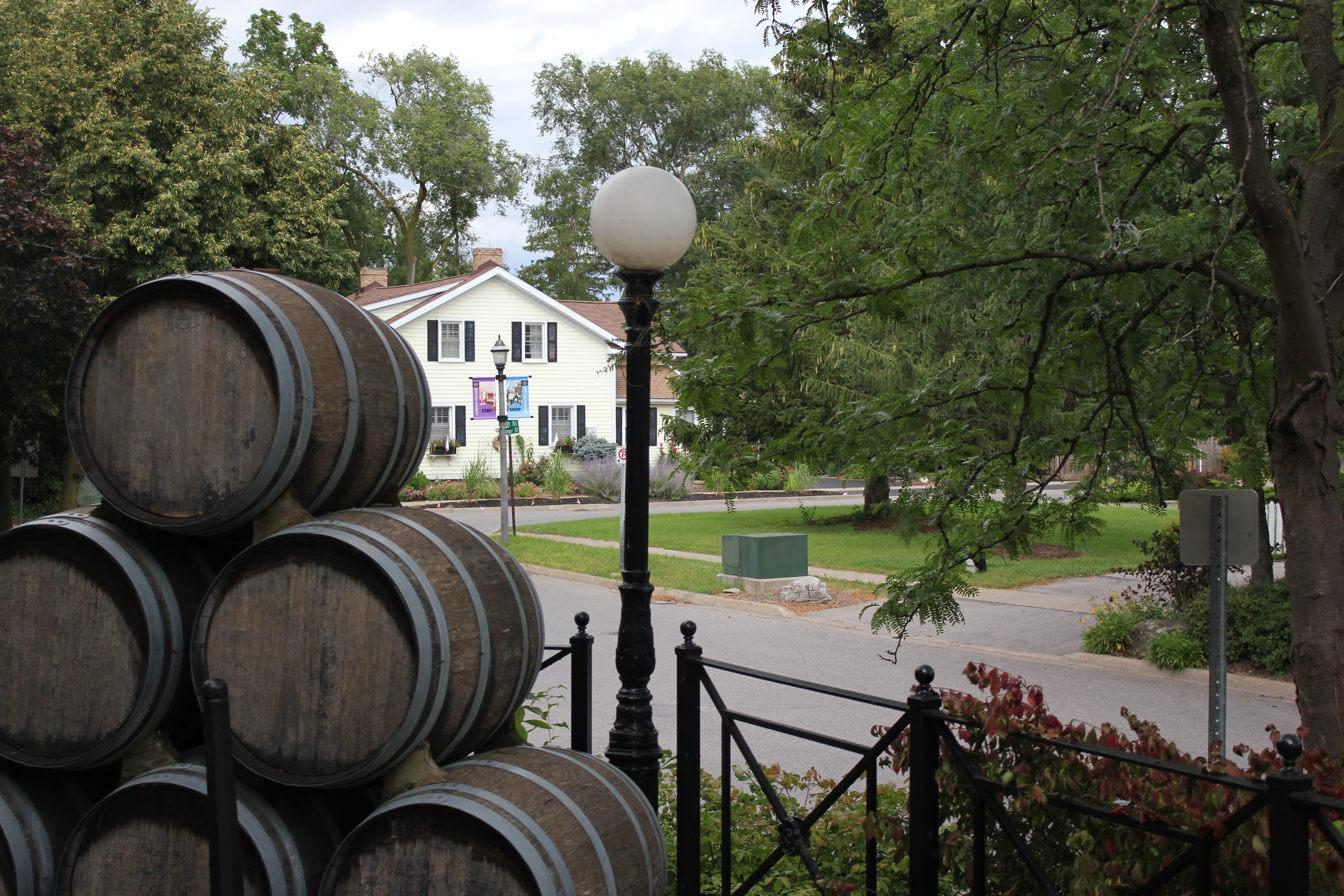
Main Street, Jordan

=== Jordan Lions Park ===
The Jordan Lions Park is located on the corner of Jordan Road and Fourth Avenue. At this location is a community pool, splash pad for children, ice hockey arena, softball diamonds, and soccer pitches.

=== Jordan Village ===
Jordan is also the site of the annual Twenty Valley Winter Winefest. Jordan has numerous shops, boutiques, and restaurants, as well as the Jordan Historical Museum.

=== Wineries ===
Jordan is in the heart of Ontario's wine country and contributes greatly to the wine industry in the Niagara Peninsula. As such, the major industry in Jordan is wine-tasting tourism. Major wineries in Jordan include:

- Sue-Ann Staff Estate Winery
- Cave Spring Cellars
- Calamus Estate Wines
- Creekside Estate Winery
- Dim Wine co.
- DiProfio Estate Winery
- Flat Rock Cellars
- Harbour Estates Winery
- Honsberger Estate Winery
- Pearl Morissette Estate Winery
- Westcott Vineyards

=== Ball's Falls Conservation Area ===
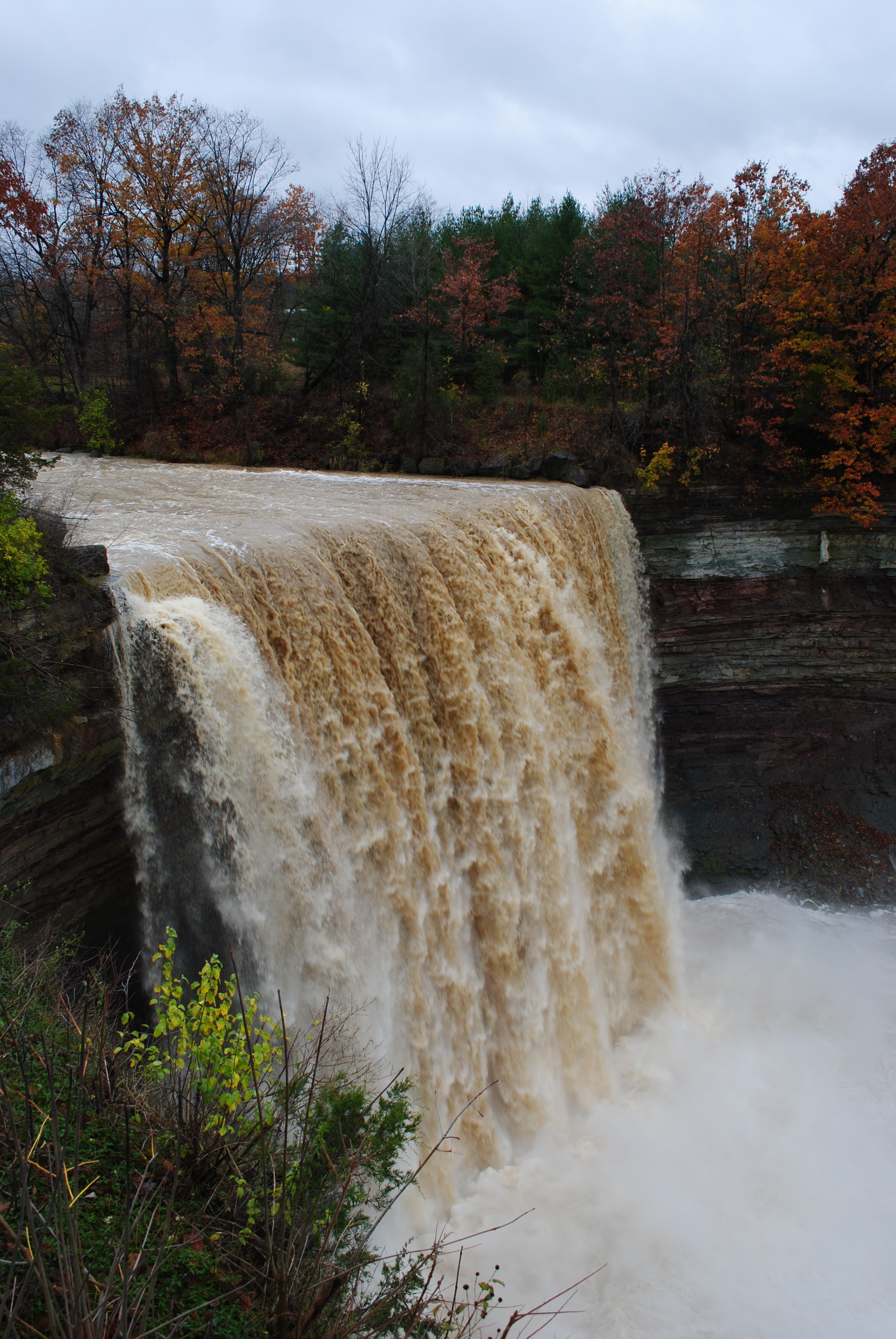
Ball's Falls is located in Jordan, Ontario, on the grounds of the Niagara Peninsula Conservation Authority's headquarters.

The Ball's Falls Conservation Area is located on the escarpment south of Jordan-proper. The conservation area is centred on the 27-metre-tall (89 ft) Lower Ball's Falls, although the smaller Upper Ball's Falls is also accessible by trail within the park.

=== Jordan Historical Museum of the Twenty ===
The Jordan Historical Museum of the Twenty is a community history museum established in 1953.
