= Twenty Valley Golf and Country Club =

Coordinates: 43.1214°N 79.4108°W

- Twenty Valley Golf and Country Club
- Interactive map of Twenty Valley Golf and Country Club

Club information
- Location: Lincoln, Ontario, Canada
- Established: 1960
- Type: Semi-Private
- Owner: Member Owned
- Tota holes: 18
- Website: http://twentyvalley.com/

Course information
- Par: 72
- Length: 6701 yards (Gold tees)
- Course rating: 72.9 (Gold tees)
- Slope rating: 128 (Gold tees)

Twenty Valley Golf and Country Club is a semi-private 18-hole golf course located in the Niagara Peninsula, in the town of Lincoln, Ontario. It is a member owned course with an elected board of directors who oversee the facility's operations

== History ==
The course first opened in 1960 with nine holes. The remaining nine holes were ready for play in 1967. Twenty Valley was designed by golf course architect Clinton E. “Robbie” Robinson, who in 2007 was inducted into the Ontario Golf Hall of Fame. In 2009 the club celebrated their 50th anniversary with an open house, open to past and current members.

== The Course ==
The Twenty Valley golf course covers approximately 142 acres at the intersection of Cherry Avenue and Young Street, near Campden, Ontario. Winding through the middle is the Twenty Mile Creek, which is where the club gets its name. The river makes for challenging play, with six (4, 6, 9, 10, 13, 18) of the eighteen holes playing across it. From the gold tees, the course plays over 6,700 yards, down to 5,144 yards from the red tees.

== Tournaments ==
- West Lincoln Memorial Hospital Foundation Golf Tournament (July 4, 2012)
- West Lincoln Memorial Hospital Foundation Golf Tournament (July 6, 2011)
- Ladies 3rd Annual Golf Classic in support of the Kidney Foundation of Canada (July 20, 2011)
- Edward Jones 9th Annual Family Tournament in support of Big Brothers & Big Sisters (June 26, 2011)
- West Niagara 12th Annual Golf Classic in support of West Niagara Second Stage and The FORT (June 1, 2011)
- Lincoln Chamber of Commerce 21st Annual Golf Tournament (May 25, 2011)
- West Niagara 11th Annual Golf Classic in support of West Niagara Second Stage and The FORT (June 17, 2009)
- Ladies 2nd Annual Golf Classic in support of the Kidney Foundation of Canada (July 21, 2010)
- Ladies 1st Annual Golf Classic in support of the Kidney Foundation of Canada (July 22, 2009)
- West Lincoln Memorial Hospital Foundation Golf Tournament (July 8, 2009)

== Scorecard ==
Tee	Rating/Slope	1	2	3	4	5	6	7	8	9	Out	10	11	12	13	14	15	16	17	18	In	Total
Par	Men's	5	4	4	4	4	4	3	4	3	35	5	4	4	3	5	4	3	4	5	37	72
Gold	72.9 / 128	467	368	458	322	393	336	167	428	170	3109	506	356	387	217	563	425	215	417	506	3592	6701
Blue	71.0 / 123	447	346	415	298	365	310	152	388	160	2881	493	344	373	180	541	410	200	391	488	3420	6301
White	67.9 / 114	433	322	395	248	354	222	140	356	151	2621	478	332	303	150	457	394	155	372	473	3114	5735
Par	Women's	5	4	4	4	4	4	3	4	3	35	4	4	4	3	5	5	3	4	5	37	72
Red	70.1 / 116	422	308	382	206	347	201	121	326	146	2459	335	322	260	113	412	385	136	350	431	2744	5203
