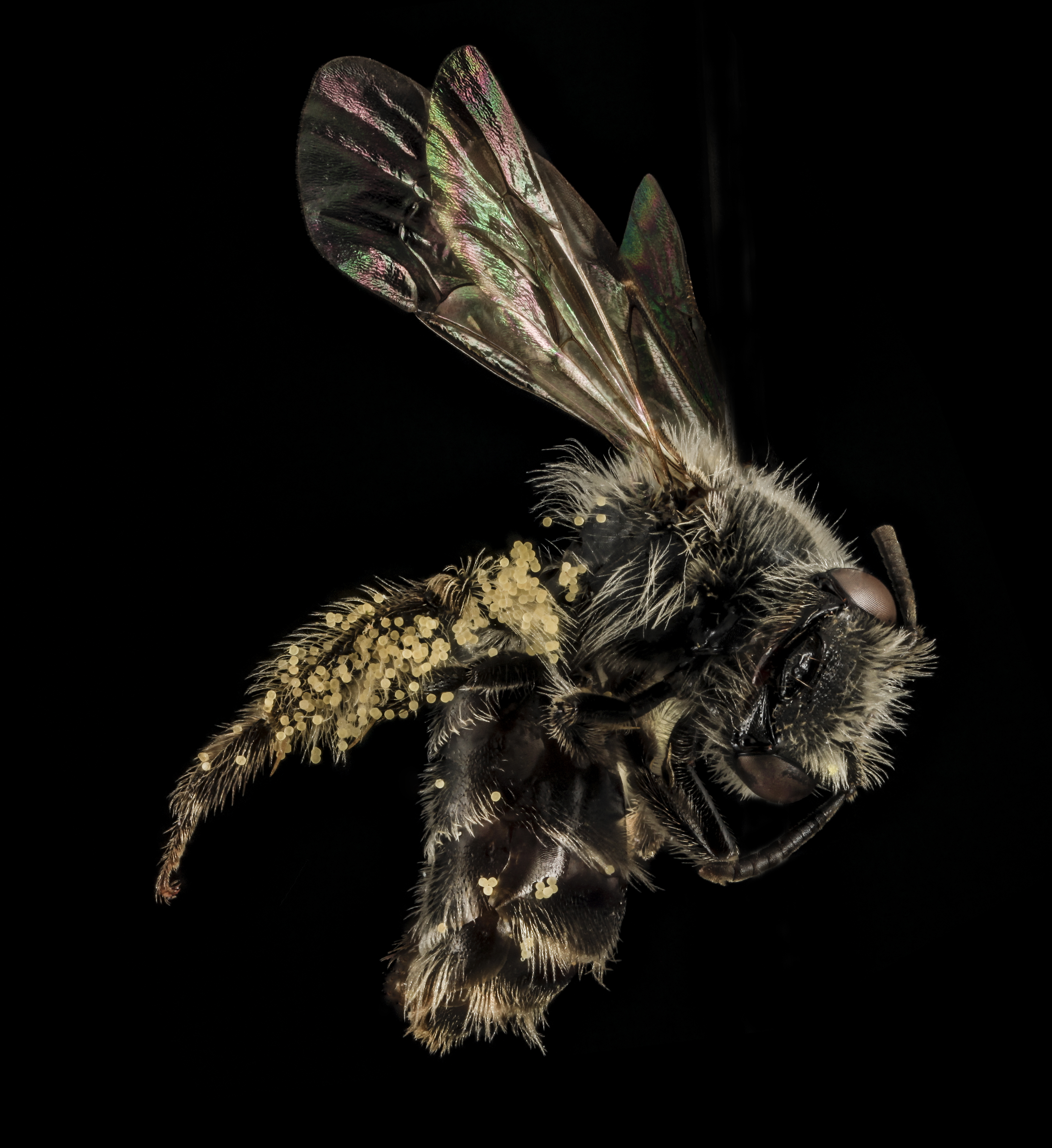

Scientific classification
- Kingdom: Animalia
- Phylum: Arthropoda
- Class: Insecta
- Order: Hymenoptera
- Family: Andrenidae
- Genus: Andrena
- Species: A. distans

Binomial name
- Andrena distans Provancher, 1888

Synonyms
- Andrena geranimaculati Viereck, 1907; Andrena gmaculati Robertson, 1897; Andrena spec Robertson, 1897; Ptilandrena gmaculati (Robertson, 1897)

= Andrena distans =

Miner bee species in the family Andrenidae

The distant miner bee (Andrena distans) is a species of miner bee in the family Andrenidae. It is found in North America. The bee can usually be found on Geranium maculatum flowers.
