= Rittenhouse =

Rittenhouse is a surname of German origin. It may refer to:

== Places ==
- Rittenhouse (crater), a crater on the far side of the Moon

=== United States ===
- Rittenhouse Elementary School, Queen Creek, Arizona; on the National Register of Historic Places
- Rittenhouse Gap, Pennsylvania
- Rittenhouse Square, one of the five original open-space parks in central Philadelphia, Pennsylvania
- RittenhouseTown Historic District, a historic area in Philadelphia surrounding the first paper mill erected in British Colonial America
- Queen Creek, Arizona, named Rittenhouse until 1947

== People with the surname ==
- Ariel Rittenhouse (born 1990), US female athlete in swimming and diving
- David Rittenhouse (1732–1796), US astronomer, inventor, mathematician, and public official
- Kyle Rittenhouse (born 2003), American acquitted of murder in the 2020 Kenosha unrest shooting
- Laura Jacinta Rittenhouse (1841–1911), American temperance worker, author, poet, orphanage manager, club woman
- Moses F. Rittenhouse (1846–1915), Canadian-born US businessman
- Rebecca Rittenhouse (born November 30, 1988), American actress
- Sara Rittenhouse Brown (1854-1938), America professor, author and musician
- William Rittenhouse (1644–1708), German-born US businessman and papermaker

== Other ==
- SS David Rittenhouse, a ship of the US Navy, launched during World War II (1943)
- Mrs. Rittenhouse, a character in Animal Crackers (1930 film)
- A train operated by Amtrak as part of the Clocker service
- A straight rye whiskey originally made in Pennsylvania, now produced in Kentucky by Heaven Hill
- A fictional organization in the 2016 TV series Timeless
