= Niagara West (federal electoral district) =

Federal electoral district in Ontario, Canada

Coordinates: 43.11°N 79.37°W

Ontario electoral district
- Interactive map of riding boundaries from the 2025 federal election

Federal electoral district
- Legislature: House of Commons
MP
Dean Allison
Conservative
- District created: 2013
- First contested: 2015
- Last contested: 2021
- District webpage: profile, map

Demographics
- Population (2011): 86,533
- Electors (2015): 68,333
- Area (km²): 1,057
- Pop. density (per km²): 81.9
- Census division: Niagara
- Census subdivision(s): St. Catharines (part), Grimsby, Lincoln, Pelham, West Lincoln, Wainfleet

Niagara West (French: Niagara-Ouest) is a federal electoral district in Ontario. It encompasses a portion of Ontario formerly included in the electoral districts of Niagara West—Glanbrook, Welland and St. Catharines. It is currently represented by Dean Allison.

== Geography ==
It includes the towns of Grimsby, Lincoln, and Pelham, the townships of West Lincoln and Wainfleet, and part of the City of St. Catharines. The boundary in St. Catharines begins at the city’s northern limit where it intersects the extension of Courtleigh Road, then follows Courtleigh Road and Third Street Louth south to Queen Elizabeth Way. It continues east along Queen Elizabeth Way to Highway 406, then south along the highway to First Street Louth, and finally south to the city’s southern limit.

== History ==
Niagara West was created by the 2012 federal electoral boundaries redistribution and was legally defined in the 2013 representation order. It came into effect upon the call of the 42nd Canadian federal election, scheduled for 19 October 2015.

== Demographics ==
According to the 2021 Canadian census

Ethnic groups: 90.4% White, 3.0% Indigenous, 1.9% South Asian, 1.3% Black

Languages: 86.3% English, 1.8% Dutch, 1.3% French, 1.2% Italian

Religions: 65.1% Christian (25.9% Catholic, 6.1% United Church, 5.8% Anglican, 4.6% Reformed, 2.0% Presbyterian, 1.4% Christian Orthodox, 1.3% Baptist, 1.1% Anabaptist, 1.0% Lutheran, 1.0% Pentecostal, 14.9% Other), 1.0% Muslim, 32.2% None

Median income: $46,000 (2020)

Average income: $59,250 (2020)

== Members of Parliament ==
This riding has elected the following members of Parliament:

Parliament	Years	Member	Party
Niagara West; Riding created from Niagara West—Glanbrook. St. Catharines and Welland
42nd	2015–2019	Dean Allison	Conservative
43rd	2019–2021	Dean Allison	Conservative
44th	2021–2025	Dean Allison	Conservative
45th	2025–present	Dean Allison	Conservative

== Election results ==
View source data.
Graph of election results in Niagara West (parties that never received 2% of the vote are omitted)

2025 Canadian federal election
Party	Candidate	Votes	%	±%	Expenditures
Conservative	Dean Allison	36,418	51.72	+7.69	$132,912.12
Liberal	Jennifer Korstanje	30,424	43.21	+12.16	$70,905.17
New Democratic	Justin Abando	2,262	3.21	–10.76	$138.45
Christian Heritage	Dave Bylsma	727	1.03	–0.02	$19,152.52
People's	Ryan Anderson	582	0.83	–6.26	$634.13
Total valid votes/expense limit		70,761	99.51	–	$138,631.95
Total rejected ballots		348	0.49		
Turnout		71,109	76.12		
Eligible voters		93,414			
Conservative notional hold		Swing		–2.07	
Source: Elections Canada

2021 federal election redistributed results
Party	Vote	%
Conservative	27,497	44.03
Liberal	19,391	31.05
New Democratic	8,724	13.97
People's	4,430	7.09
Green	1,749	2.80
Others	657	1.05

2021 Canadian federal election
Party	Candidate	Votes	%	±%	Expenditures
Conservative	Dean Allison	25,206	45.6	+0.2	
Liberal	Ian Bingham	16,815	30.4	-1.9	
New Democratic	Nameer Rahman	7,064	12.8	+0.7	
People's	Shaunalee Derkson	3,933	7.1	+5.5	
Green	Joanna Kocsis	1,602	2.9	-3.8	
Christian Heritage	Harold Jonker	657	1.2	-0.7	
Total valid votes		55,277	99.6		
Total rejected ballots		217	0.4		
Turnout		55,494	71.6		
Eligible voters		77,484			
Conservative hold		Swing		+1.1	
Source: Elections Canada

2019 Canadian federal election
Party	Candidate	Votes	%	±%	Expenditures
Conservative	Dean Allison	24,447	45.4	-3.42	$86,960.67
Liberal	Ian Bingham	17,429	32.3	-0.43	$77,942.53
New Democratic	Nameer Rahman	6,540	12.1	+0.65	none listed
Green	Terry Teather	3,620	6.7	+3.72	$4,788.88
Christian Heritage	Harold Jonker	1,019	1.9	-0.54	$16,035.83
People's	Miles Morton	869	1.6		none listed
Total valid votes/expense limit		53,924	100.0		
Total rejected ballots		252			
Turnout		54,176	72.5		
Eligible voters		74,760			
Conservative hold		Swing		-2.99	
Source: Elections Canada

2015 Canadian federal election
Party	Candidate	Votes	%	±%	Expenditures
Conservative	Dean Allison	24,732	48.82	-10.64	$81,875.54
Liberal	Phil Rose	16,581	32.73	+18.44	$55,489.05
New Democratic	Nameer Rahman	5,802	11.45	-7.76	$12,449.14
Green	Sid Frere	1,511	2.98	-1.53	$990.69
Christian Heritage	Harold Jonker	1,234	2.44	–	$21,772.10
Libertarian	Allan de Roo	797	1.57	–	–
Total valid votes/expense limit		50,657	100.00		$202,783.01
Total rejected ballots		242	0.48	–	
Turnout		50,889	73.83	–	
Eligible voters		68,937			
Conservative hold		Swing		-14.54	
Source: Elections Canada

2011 federal election redistributed results
Party	Vote	%
Conservative	25,999	59.47
New Democratic	8,401	19.22
Liberal	6,249	14.29
Green	1,972	4.51
Others	1,100	2.52

== Student vote results ==
2025 Niagara West student vote
50.31%	27.30%	10.98%	6.93%	4.48%
Conservative	Liberal	NDP	PPC	CHP

== See also ==
- List of Canadian electoral districts
- Historical federal electoral districts of Canada
