= William Fairbrother =

Canadian ice hockey player

William Dycer Fairbrother (born 23 Jan 1874) was a Canadian ice hockey player who is credited with inventing the ice hockey net in the 1890s.

== Hockey net invention ==
Fairbrother was born on 23 Jan 1874 in Beamsville, Lincoln, Ontario, Canada. During the 1880s, Fairbrother played for Beamsville, Ontario's Men's Hockey team. He played in the Southern Ontario Hockey Association. At first, two poles or two rocks served as goals, and an official would watch to see if a puck passed through the goal. However, disputes arose over goals and biased officiating. Then, Fairbrother, who played as a goaltender, got a net from a local fisherman and strung it from the poles. Players were immediately more satisfied with the new system.

== Later life and death ==
Fairbrother was Beamsville clerk 1914-1931 and treasurer 1922-1931, then county registrar until he retired in 1949. He died 11 Nov 1956.

== Legacy ==
The Ontario Hockey Association credited Fairbrother with the invention of the hockey net. Hockey Hall of Fame records indicate that Fairbrother's idea happened in 1897 or 1898. The Jordan Historical Museum of the Twenty held an exhibit on Fairbrother. In February 1997, the town Lincoln, Ontario designated Fairbrother's home a historical site.
