= Jordan Historical Museum of the Twenty =

Coordinates: 43.14747°N 79.369976°W

The Lincoln Museum and Cultural Centre: Home of the Jordan Historical Museum is a community history museum established in 1953 that tells the story of the five towns and villages located within the boundaries of the Lincoln, Ontario. The museum began as a joint project between Jordan Wines and the people of the area, many of whom were descendants of Pennsylvania German Mennonite Pennsylvania Dutch and Loyalist settlers United Empire Loyalists.

The museum consists of an acre of land that overlooks the Twenty Mile Creek, with three buildings: the 1815 Pennsylvania German Mennonite log farmhouse, an 1859 stone school house, and a main administration building that features an exhibit gallery with a special collection of fraktur folk art Fraktur. The log farmhouse is located on the site of a former church, demolished in 1899, and is surrounded by a grave site featuring names of Loyalist and Mennonite families.

== The School House ==
In 1858, a little to the west of where the current school house sits, a red brick school house destroyed by a fire. The following year, the school trustees oversaw the building of a new structure, made from local limestone. It was larger, and brighter, quite up-to-the-minute for its time with huge windows, carefully chosen colour scheme designed to encourage attention and obedience. The floor sloped, angled up and away from the teacher's raised platform, so that students at the back could see clearly over the heads of the children in front of them.

It became a center of the community, and was used for the local Ladies Intellectual Club meetings, adult German language classes, and annual Christmas pageant.

Most of the children came from farms, and the boys especially were not the most attentive students, as they often had more immediate, pressing duties at home. Many a child would come to school already exhausted from being up early attending to chores, and often, classes would be vastly reduced as the spring and fall arrived. Children from this school developed a reputation for being hard on the teachers, who were often young, female, and fresh out of teacher's college. It was uncommon for any teacher to stay longer than one term.

The school was in use for 89 years, until a bigger, much more modern one was built nearby. The stone school house was abandoned, stripped of its interior, and left alone. In 1952, Jordan Wines purchased it and gave it back to the community. It was filled with agricultural tools and artisan's equipment, and turned into a museum, which opened in 1953.

In 1997 the school house was restored to look as it would have in 1908. Desks were found, the ceiling was replaced, as was the dividing wall and the girls and boys separate entrances, and all the details of a one-room school of that period were carefully installed. A school field trip program was set up whereby children would come for the day and roleplay as a student there in 1908.

During the summer months, the schoolhouse is open to the public.

== The Fry House ==
When Jacob Fry and his family left Pennsylvania in 1800, he was one of more than 30 families seeking religious freedom and the good farming said to be had in Upper Canada. Of German Mennonite background, the families were hardworking, faithful, and very community oriented. Jacob settled first near Grimsby, but soon was convinced by his wife to move to Vineland in 1815, to be close to the other families who had settled there.

The house he built, with its central chimney plan and double attic, was based on medieval German architecture, and was a statement of the strong traditions of his community. The Fry family lived in it until 1895, when, typical of the conservative lifestyle of these people, a brick home was built less than 200 yards away. The little log house was left as a playhouse for the children, and even served time as a chicken house.

In the late 1950s, a group of volunteers rescued the house, and moved it down to its current site on the museum grounds. It was restored, and turned into a showcase for the artifacts and lifestyle of the Fry family, including the weaver Samuel Fry, the only one of Jacob's sons who lived in the house.

Samuel went to Pennsylvania around 1830 to learn the weaving trade in more detail, and on his return, he married Anna, the daughter of his father's second wife. Samuel was a well-known local weaver, producing beautiful coverlets and other items. He also has the distinction of being the best-documented early weaver known, with his original pattern and account books, as well as his wedding suit, still in existence.

The house became renowned for having the most complete set of original furnishings in a pioneer-craftsman's home. Of particular interest are the beautiful schranks (clothespresses or wardrobes) made by Jacob Fry. The pieces produced by Jacob Fry, along with those of some other local cabinetmakers of Pennsylvania German Mennonite origin, launched the interest in antiques in Niagara.

The house has undergone a complete restoration, and now offers summer visitors the opportunity to experience a tour with costumed interpreters, including a peek upstairs at some of the beds originally used by the Fry family. The beds are made up in the traditional Pennsylvania German manner.

== Harvest Pioneer Day ==
The first Harvest Pioneer Day was held as a Canadian Centennial Year (1967) event, as a festival designed to highlight and showcase the traditions of the area's past through demonstrations of the crafts, skills, and activities of local settlers. The festival has been held every year since, and is held on the third Saturday of September.

== Jordan Village Haunted Tour ==
The first Jordan Village Haunted Tour took place in 2008. Guests are taken on a walking tour of the most haunted building in Jordan Village and the Jordan Historical Museum. The tours takes place the weekend before Halloween.
