= Beamsville, Ontario =

Beamsville
- Unincorporated community
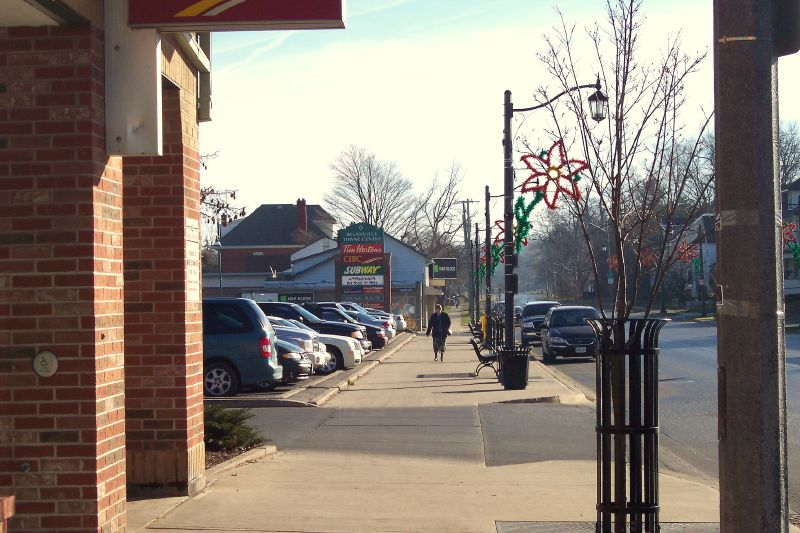
- King Street in Beamsville.

- Location within Ontario Location within Canada
- Coordinates: 43°09′57″N 79°28′35″W
- Country: Canada
- Province: Ontario
- Regional Municipality: Niagara
- Town: Lincoln
- Founded: 1788

Government
  - Type: Mayor-council government
  - Mayor: Sandra Easton
  - Governing Body: Town of Lincoln Council
  - MP: Dean Allison (CPC)
  - MPP: Sam Oosterhoff (PC)

Area
  - Total: 9.19 km^{2} (3.55 sq mi)

Population (2021)
  - Total: 13,323
  - Density: 1,287.6/km^{2} (3,335/sq mi)
- Time zone: UTC−05:00 (EST)
  - Summer (DST): UTC−04:00 (EDT)
- Forward sortation area: L3J, L0R 1B0, L0R 2N0, L0R 3B0
- Area code: 905 / 289 / 365
- Highways: Queen Elizabeth Way
- NTS Map: 030M03
- GNBC Code: FEGRM

Beamsville (2021 Urban area estimated population 13,323) is a community that is part of the town of Lincoln, Ontario, Canada. It is located along the southern shore of Lake Ontario and lies within the fruit belt of the Niagara Peninsula. It contains century-old brick buildings, an old-fashioned downtown area with barbershops, women's dress shops, a bakery, a print shop, restaurants, banks and other businesses, and many orchards and vineyards.

Queen Elizabeth Way, the main road that connects Toronto and Buffalo, New York, has an interchange at Beamsville. Many tourists stop for something to eat at the many fast-food restaurants nearby.

== Industry ==
Beamsville is in the heart of Ontario's wine country and contributes greatly to the wine industry in the Niagara Peninsula. Many wineries from the area have won top awards locally and internationally, including Grape King at the Niagara Grape & Wine Festival and Malivoire Wine Company, founded on the Beamsville Bench in 1996, which was named Canadian Winery of the Year at the 2021 National Wine Awards of Canada.

Alanson Harris operated a foundry making farm tools that became farm implements maker Massey Harris.

== History ==
Beamsville was named after Jacob Beam (1723–1812), a United Empire Loyalist. Both of his homes—the original one, on Thirty Mile Creek, and the one near downtown Beamsville—are still intact.

Jacob Beam, his wife Anna Catharine (Boughner) Beam (1737–1820) and their daughter Catharine (Beam) Merrell (1766–1842) and son-in-law Samuel Russell Merrell (1757–1835), emigrated to Canada from Hopewell, Sussex County, New Jersey in 1788, and founded Beamsville.

By 1869, it was a village of 550 in the Township of Clinton, Lincoln County, on the Great Western Railway.

In 1898, hockey players in Beamsville were the first to use a hockey net.

In 1917 the Royal Flying Corps established a School of Aerial Fighting on the farmland immediately east of Beamsville. It consisted of a camp, an airfield, and a gunnery range over Lake Ontario. Today an historical plaque at 4222 Sann Road marks the geographical centre of the 300-acre school property. Adjacent to the plaque is an original hangar building.

In 1970, the Town of Beamsville was amalgamated with Clinton Township and (half of) Louth Township to form the larger Town of Lincoln.

== Education ==
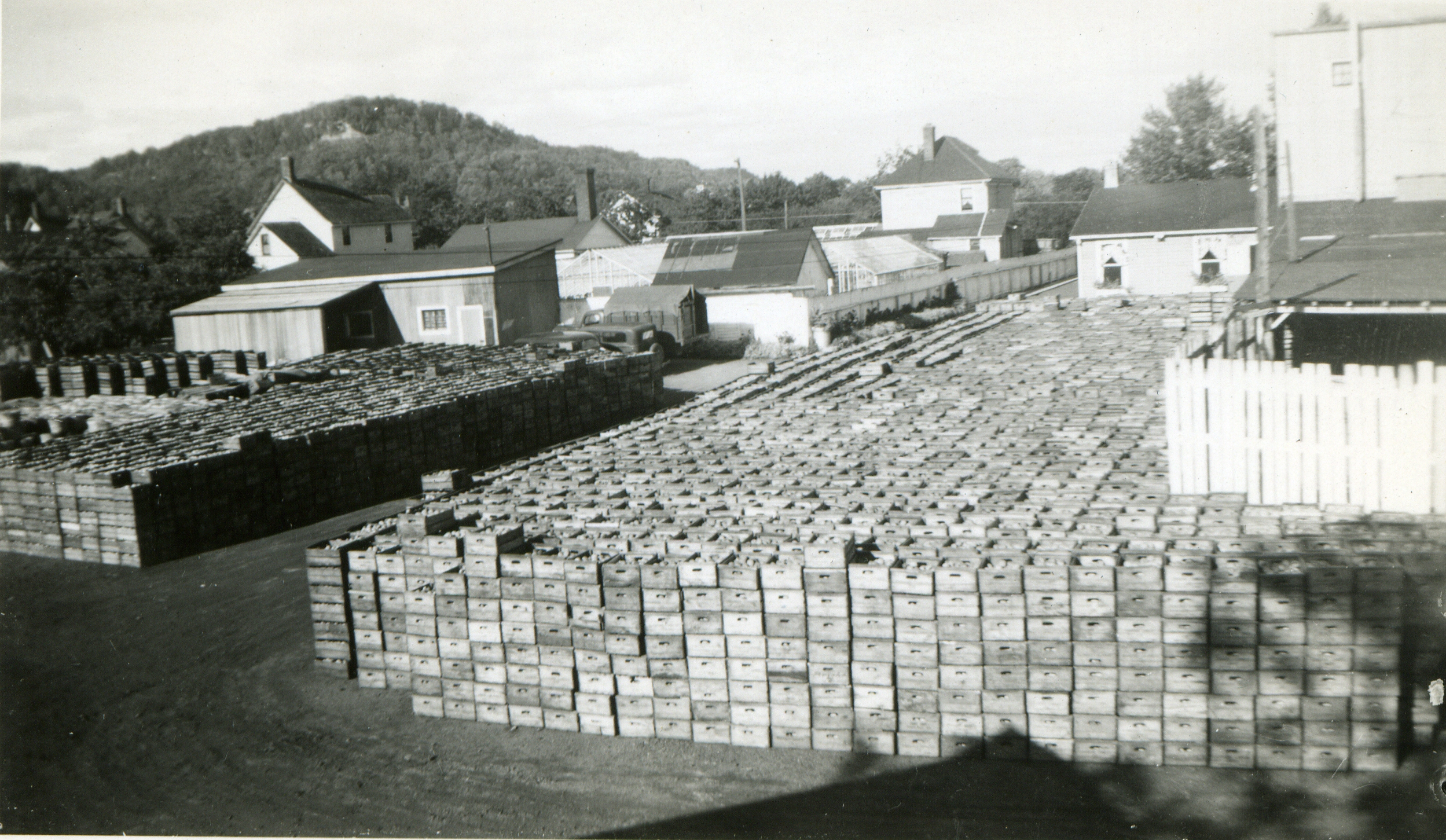
Alfred Peckham orchards 1924

Beamsville has two secondary schools (grades 9 to 12) and four elementary schools (Kindergarten to Grade 8).

=== District School Board of Niagara ===
Beamsville used to have a public secondary school, Beamsville District Secondary School. Beamsville District Secondary School, on Central Avenue, was established in 1888 and drew in students from all over the Town of Lincoln. Its final principal before closing was Sandra Orr, and the student population was just over 400.

There are two public elementary schools located in Beamsville, Senator Gibson Public School and Jacob Beam Public School.

=== Niagara Catholic District School Board ===
The Niagara Catholic District School Board has two elementary schools in Beamsville (St. John and St. Mark). St. Mark Catholic Elementary School was opened in 2001. It has undergone a large expansion in 2011, growing to 22 classrooms. The current enrollment at St. Mark is 541 students. St. John Catholic Elementary School was built in 1958 and the current enrollment is 346 students.

A third Catholic elementary school in Beamsville, St. Luke Catholic Elementary School, is currently under construction with a budget of $24.4 million and is expected to be completed by February 2027.

=== Private schools ===
Great Lakes Christian High School is a private, four-year coeducational day and boarding Christian high school affiliated with the Churches of Christ.

== People ==
Beamsville is home to numerous Dutch and United Empire Loyalist families, as evidenced by its large number of Dutch Reformed and Anglican churches.

William Fairbrother, inventor of the hockey net, lived in Beamsville. Bill Berg, formerly a hockey player for the Toronto Maple Leafs and now an National Hockey League (NHL) broadcaster, was born, and continues to make his home in Beamsville. Paul Laus, a former Florida Panthers defenceman, and Ryan Christie, who played seven games with the Dallas Stars and Calgary Flames, are also Beamsville natives.

Another Beamsville native, Tonya Verbeek, earned an Olympic silver medal in women's wrestling at the 2004 Summer Olympics in Athens, Greece. She won a bronze medal at the 2008 Summer Olympics in Beijing, China, and another silver medal at the 2012 Summer Olympics in London, England.

Beamsville natives Ralph Reid and Lloyd Southward were Lancaster pilots during the Second World War and both received the Distinguished Flying Cross (DFC).

Another Beamsville native is former Canadian Football League (CFL) running back Andre Sadeghian, who was drafted in the third round of the 2007 CFL Draft by the BC Lions and played four seasons with the Lions, the Hamilton Tiger-Cats, the Saskatchewan Roughriders, and the Winnipeg Blue Bombers.

Evelyn Dick, known for the murder of her estranged husband John Dick, was born and lived in this town.

Performance artist, writer and former sex worker Nina Arsenault grew up in a trailer park in Beamsville.
