= Lincoln, Ontario =

Lincoln
- Town (lower-tier)
- Town of Lincoln
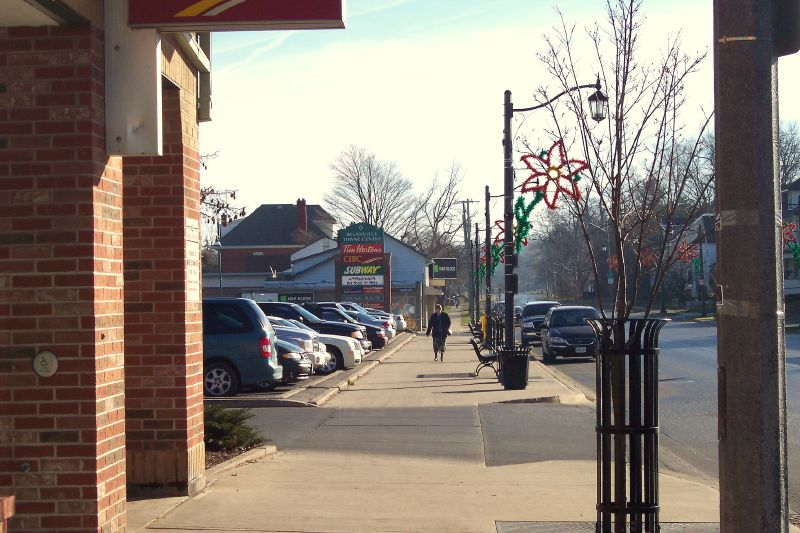
- King Street in Beamsville

- Flag

- Location within Regional Municipality of Niagara Location within Southern Ontario
- Coordinates: 43°09′10″N 79°25′06″W
- Country: Canada
- Province: Ontario
- Regional Municipality: Niagara
- Settled: 1788
- Formed: January 1, 1970

Government
  - Type: Town
  - Mayor: Adam Thomas Russell
  - Governing Body: Town of Lincoln Council
  - MP: Dean Allison
  - MPP: Sam Oosterhoff

Area
  - Land: 162.81 km^{2} (62.86 sq mi)

Population (2016)
  - Total: 23,787
  - Density: 146.1/km^{2} (378/sq mi)
- Time zone: UTC-5 (EST)
  - Summer (DST): UTC-4 (EDT)
- Postal code span: L0R
- Area code: 905
- Website: www.lincoln.ca

Lincoln is a town on Lake Ontario in the Niagara Region, Ontario, Canada. The town's administrative and commercial centre is in the community of Beamsville.

== Geography ==
Lincoln's location between the southern shore of Lake Ontario and the Niagara Escarpment provides for a moderate climate with mild winters. The area is known in Canada for its orchards, vineyards, wineries and restaurants that feature local produce and wines. Fruit crops grown in Lincoln include cherries, peaches, apples and pears, and during the summer attract many tourists from all over Ontario, particularly Toronto. Since January 2023, the town has been served by Niagara Region Transit's OnDemand microtransit service. GO Transit also serves the town.

== Communities ==
The town comprises the communities of Beamsville, Campden, Jordan, Jordan Station, Rockway, Tintern, Vineland and Vineland Station.

== History ==
Lincoln's earliest known inhabitants was the Neutral Confederacy, also called the Attawandaron. Archaeologists from the Royal Ontario Museum found evidence of a Neutral encampment with a long house about two kilometers east of Beamsville, on Cave Springs Farm. Until vandals destroyed them about 30 years ago, there were a number of Indigenous faces carved in stone high on the Escarpment wall nearby.

The Neutrals were decimated by the Iroquois in 1653. When the first European settlers arrived in 1777, there were only a few semi-migrant native people living in the caves near Beamsville.

The earliest European settlers were ex-Butler's Rangers who had fought on the side of Britain in the American Revolution. United Empire Loyalist Jacob Beam began what is now the town of Beamsville in 1788. Both of his homes the original one located on The Thirty (creek) and the one near downtown Beamsville are still intact today. Senator William Gibson is another key figure in the history of Beamsville. His mansion is now the Girls' Dorm at Great Lakes Christian College. Beamsville was also home to the annual Lincoln County Agricultural Fair, usually held on or around the first weekend of September. This fair was very well known fair throughout the area, and attracted thousands of people every year since its inception in 1857. The Fair is no longer held in Beamsville since the grounds were sold to become a housing development.

In 1898, hockey player William Fairbrother, in the town of Beamsville, was the first to make use of a hockey net. The town was also home to the first Japanese-Canadian home for the aged in 1967.

Mennonites (Pennsylvania Dutch) walking north from the United States in 1799 founded the villages of Jordan and Vineland. An Ontario Historical Plaque was erected at the Jordan Museum by the province to commemorate the first Mennonite Settlement's role in Ontario's heritage. The First Mennonite Church in Vineland, adjacent to the cemetery at the corner of Regional Road 81 (former Highway 8) and Martin Road, organized in 1801, is the oldest Mennonite congregation in Canada.

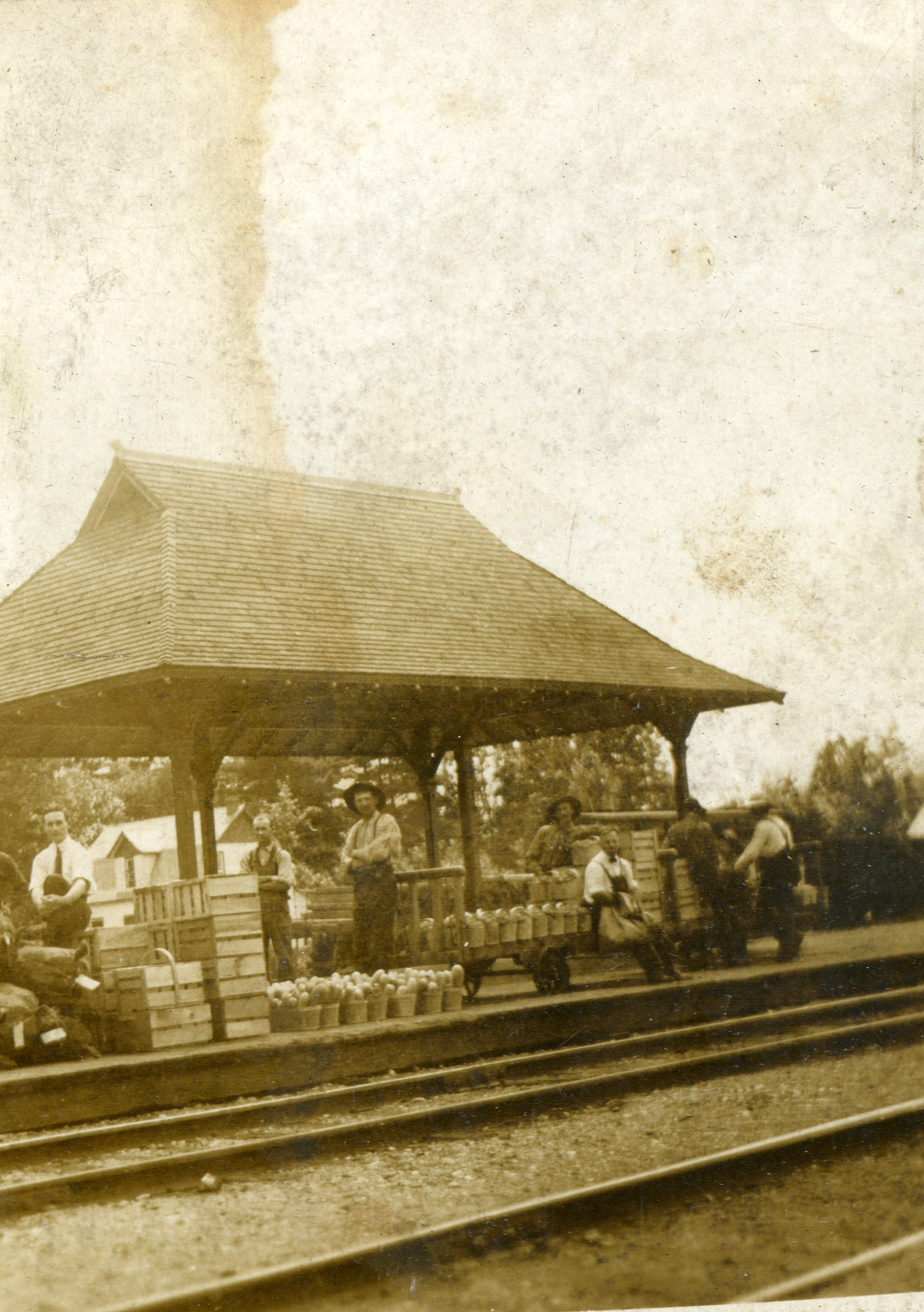
Beamsville market stall at railway

Good hunting and fishing as well as excellent soil and waterways attracted these early settlers. Agriculture flourished, and tanneries, grist mills, saw mills and woollen mills sprang up in Glen Elgin (now known as Ball's Falls), Tintern, St. Mary's, called Jordan after 1840, Rockway, The Thirty (now vanished) and Beamsville.

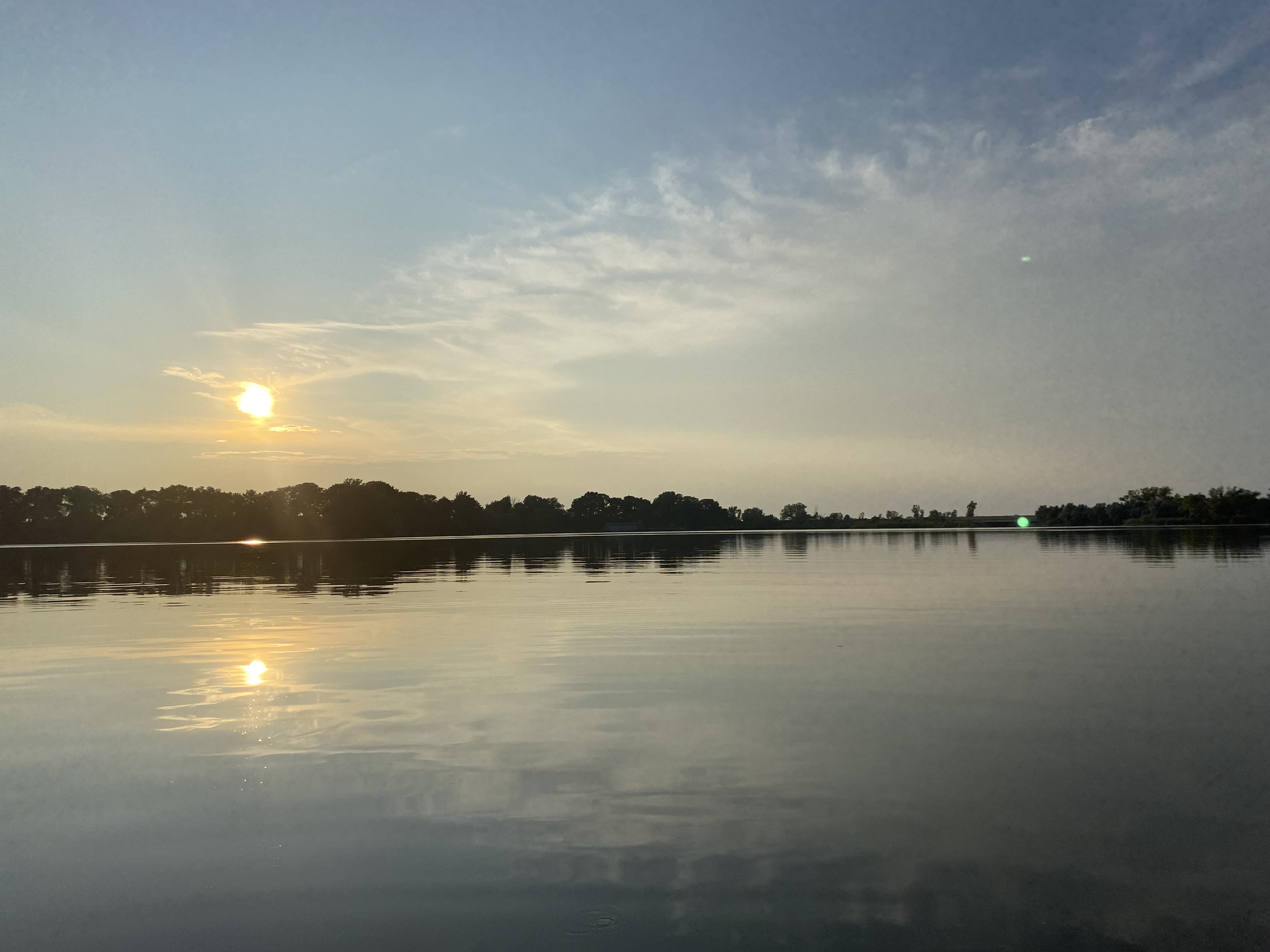
Jordan Harbour in 2023

With a large natural harbour at the mouth of Twenty Creek, Jordan and Jordan Station became busy shipping centres for the export of logs for masts, tan bark, hides, ashes used in industrial centres for the manufacture of soap, as well as grain, flour, fruit and fruit products. A small ship building industry existed for a time on the banks of the Twenty.

Today, Lincoln is a leading area for fruit production and grape growing. Its wines achieve international recognition and winning awards for quality. "Greenhouse Friendly" Lincoln also has the largest concentration of greenhouse operators in Canada.

In its earliest days what is now Lincoln was regarded, and governed, as an extension of the province of Quebec, but in 1791 the Canada Bill placed it in English Upper Canada. Colonel John Graves Simcoe, first Lieutenant Governor of Upper Canada, divided the province into 19 counties. He named Lincoln County after its English counterpart, and each of its 12 townships, including Clinton and Louth, after towns in Lincolnshire, England.

The first township councils, formed in 1793, had no legislative authority. In response to the Rebellion of 1837, the 1849 Municipal Act gave local councils much more power to deal with local matters.

The Town of Lincoln came into existence on January 1, 1970, a municipal corporation created by the Legislature of Ontario through the amalgamation of the Town of Beamsville, the Township of Clinton, and approximately half the Township of Louth. Through a vote of citizens, "Lincoln" was chosen to be its name.

== People ==
The town is home to numerous Dutch and United Empire Loyalist families, as evidenced by the large number of Dutch Reformed and Anglican churches in the area. Other ethnic groups include Italians - one family which founded the Commisso's Food Markets supermarket chain - Germans, East Asians, and Indians.

Katherine "Kay" McKeever, also known as the "Owl Lady of Canada," spent over forty years saving, rehabilitating, and breeding owls in Lincoln. In 1965, McKeever rescued her first owl, leading to her lifelong passion of rescuing and understanding owls. In the 1970s, Mckeever and her husband Larry founded The Owl Rehabilitation and Research Foundation, an Ontario non-profit corporation dedicated to helping injured owls. In 1994, the Foundation was re-incorporated as a Canadian non-profit corporation and renamed The Owl Foundation. The Foundation's facility, located in Vineland, has 26 acres of property and can host up to fifty owls. The facility usually handles between 100 and 150 injured owls each year. McKeever is recognized as one of the world's foremost experts in owl behavior. She has written and published a number of books, has two honorary doctorates, is a member of the Order of Canada, and has received numerous wildlife and volunteer awards.

William Fairbrother, the inventor of the hockey net, lived in Lincoln. Bill Berg, formerly a hockey player for the Toronto Maple Leafs, and now an NHL broadcaster, was born, and continues to make his home in Beamsville. Paul Laus, a former Florida Panthers bruiser defenceman, and Ryan Christie, who played seven games with the Dallas Stars and Calgary Flames are also Beamsville natives. Another Beamsville native of note, Tonya Verbeek, earned an Olympic silver medal in women's wrestling at the 2004 Summer Olympics in Athens, Greece. At the 2008 Summer Olympics in Beijing, China, Tonya Verbeek excelled once again by winning the bronze medal in women's freestyle wrestling, 55 kg class. John Chayka who was a former NHLGeneral Manager for the Arizona Coyotes was raised in Jordan Station.

The band Rush practised in Beamsville in their earlier days. Drummer Neil Peart was raised in nearby Port Dalhousie.

== Industry ==
Wine production contributes to the local economy.

== Climate ==
Climate data for Vineland Rittenhouse (1991−2020 normals, extremes 1901–present)
Month	Jan	Feb	Mar	Apr	May	Jun	Jul	Aug	Sep	Oct	Nov	Dec	Year
Record high °C (°F)	20.0 (68.0)	19.4 (66.9)	27.0 (80.6)	32.2 (90.0)	34.0 (93.2)	36.7 (98.1)	39.4 (102.9)	39.4 (102.9)	36.7 (98.1)	31.9 (89.4)	27.2 (81.0)	21.5 (70.7)	39.4 (102.9)
Mean daily maximum °C (°F)	0.2 (32.4)	0.8 (33.4)	5.3 (41.5)	11.6 (52.9)	18.6 (65.5)	24.1 (75.4)	27.1 (80.8)	26.1 (79.0)	22.3 (72.1)	15.5 (59.9)	8.9 (48.0)	3.2 (37.8)	13.6 (56.5)
Daily mean °C (°F)	−3.3 (26.1)	−2.9 (26.8)	1.4 (34.5)	7.0 (44.6)	13.3 (55.9)	19.1 (66.4)	22.2 (72.0)	21.4 (70.5)	17.6 (63.7)	11.3 (52.3)	5.2 (41.4)	0.1 (32.2)	9.4 (48.9)
Mean daily minimum °C (°F)	−6.8 (19.8)	−6.4 (20.5)	−2.6 (27.3)	2.4 (36.3)	8.0 (46.4)	14.0 (57.2)	17.2 (63.0)	16.6 (61.9)	12.9 (55.2)	7.1 (44.8)	1.5 (34.7)	−3 (27)	5.1 (41.2)
Record low °C (°F)	−25 (−13)	−25.6 (−14.1)	−19.5 (−3.1)	−15 (5)	−3.3 (26.1)	1.7 (35.1)	6.1 (43.0)	3.3 (37.9)	−0.6 (30.9)	−6.7 (19.9)	−14.4 (6.1)	−24.5 (−12.1)	−25.6 (−14.1)
Average precipitation mm (inches)	71.1 (2.80)	52.4 (2.06)	62.1 (2.44)	82.8 (3.26)	69.8 (2.75)	78.1 (3.07)	74.2 (2.92)	68.7 (2.70)	68.7 (2.70)	76.7 (3.02)	71.8 (2.83)	61.6 (2.43)	838.0 (32.99)
Average rainfall mm (inches)	32.1 (1.26)	33.4 (1.31)	43.5 (1.71)	69.6 (2.74)	75.6 (2.98)	81.0 (3.19)	85.1 (3.35)	75.2 (2.96)	83.5 (3.29)	74.0 (2.91)	79.3 (3.12)	47.2 (1.86)	779.4 (30.69)
Average snowfall cm (inches)	32.2 (12.7)	23.7 (9.3)	21.5 (8.5)	4.4 (1.7)	0.8 (0.3)	0.0 (0.0)	0.0 (0.0)	0.0 (0.0)	0.0 (0.0)	0.1 (0.0)	6.6 (2.6)	22.9 (9.0)	112.2 (44.2)
Average precipitation days (≥ 0.2 mm)	18.1	13.0	13.4	13.5	12.6	12.0	11.3	11.1	10.9	13.3	13.4	14.9	157.5
Average rainy days (≥ 0.2 mm)	7.1	6.6	9.7	13.8	12.9	12.2	11.6	11.2	12.9	12.9	14.0	9.9	134.8
Average snowy days (≥ 0.2 cm)	10.5	7.1	5.2	1.4	0.14	0.0	0.0	0.0	0.0	0.05	2.3	7.5	34.3
Average relative humidity (%) (at 15:00)	67.3	65.7	63.3	61.7	61.5	60.7	57.9	59.1	61.3	64.4	65.3	69.5	63.1
Mean monthly sunshine hours	88.9	97.3	144.8	180.6	229.7	263.9	286.4	246.1	176.6	143.1	83.3	64.2	2,005
Percentage possible sunshine	30.6	32.9	39.2	45.0	50.6	57.4	61.5	56.9	47.0	41.7	28.5	22.9	42.8
Source: Environment Canada (rain/snowfall 1981–2010, sunshine recorded at Vineland Station, 1971–2000)

== Demographics ==
Population History, Beamsville
Year	Pop.	±%
1841	250	—
1871	1,000	+300.0%
1901	832	−16.8%
1911	1,096	+31.7%
1921	1,256	+14.6%
1931	1,203	−4.2%
1941	1,309	+8.8%
1951	1,712	+30.8%
1961	2,537	+48.2%

Population History, Lincoln
Year	Pop.	±%
1971	14,247	—
1981	14,196	−0.4%
1991	17,149	+20.8%
2001	20,612	+20.2%
2006	21,722	+5.4%
2011	22,487	+3.5%
2016	23,787	+5.8%
2021	25,719	+8.1%

In the 2021 Census of Population conducted by Statistics Canada, Lincoln had a population of 25,719 living in 9,555 of its 9,826 total private dwellings, a change of 8.1% from its 2016 population of 23,787. With a land area of 162.74 km^{2} (62.83 sq mi), it had a population density of 158.0/km^{2} (409.3/sq mi) in 2021.

== Culture ==
The Lincoln Public Library has branches in Beamsville and Vineland. The Fleming Branch in Beamsville, founded in 1852, had been located in the old Clinton-Louth town hall built in the mid-19th century. The upper floor of the building has been used by Freemasons for over a century. In June 2014, the Fleming Branch was relocated to the new community complex at 5020 Serena Drive. The Moses F. Rittenhouse Branch is located in Vineland.

Vineland is host to a large craft fair that takes place over a period of four days on Canadian Thanksgiving weekend. Craft stalls are set up on the main street, Victoria Avenue, and at the Ball's Falls Conservation Area. This festival also extends into the ball park in Jordan.

== See also ==
- List of townships in Ontario
