= Great Lakes Christian High School =

Coordinates: 43.16517°N 79.46948°W

Location
- 4875 King Street; Beamsville, Ontario, L3J 2J1; Canada

Information
- Type: Private High School
- Motto: Seek, Serve, Become.
- Religious affiliation: Christian
- Established: 1952
- School number: 885118
- Principal: Kerri Kennedy
- Grades: Preschool and Grade 9-12
- Enrollment: 110-120 (average)
- Team name: Lakers
- Yearbook: HEMSO
- Website: www.glchs.ca

Great Lakes Christian High School is a private Christian high school in Beamsville, Ontario affiliated with the Churches of Christ.

== History ==
Great Lakes Christian High School (formerly Great Lakes Christian College) was established in 1952 by members of the Church of Christ. Through a high school program delivered from a Christian worldview and a post-secondary Bible program (see Great Lakes Bible College), the intention was to build up the church and equip people to serve and lead in ministry. The school operates on the former estate of S.T. Creet, who had purchased the property from the estate of Senator William Gibson in 1918. Senator Gibson’s former home, “Inverugie,” served as the main school building for several years and continues to be used today as a girl’s dormitory now called Perry Hall.

The high school program has attracted on average 100 to 120 students annually, peaking at over 200 in the early 1980s. International student enrolment began in the early 1970s. New buildings added over time include Ellis Hall, the main academic building, in 1965, Tallman Auditorium. a double-sized gymnasium in 1977, and Merritt Hall, a boy’s dormitory, in 2002. Great Lakes Bible College moved its operation to Waterloo, Ontario in 1993, and Great Lakes Christian Preschool was opened in 1996 and continues to operate on campus today.

In 2008 Great Lakes Christian College was rebranded as Great Lakes Christian High School.
