= Samuel Coffman =

Canadian minister

- Born: Samuel Frederick Coffman; June 11, 1872; Ruskville, Virginia, USA
- Died: June 28, 1954 (aged 82); Vineland, Ontario, Canada
- Education: Moody Bible Institute, Chicago, 1894-95, 1897-98
- Occupation(s): Mennonite minister, bishop, churchman, 1895-54; pastor, Moyer Mennonite Church, Vineland, 1901-54; teacher and principal, Ontario Mennonite Bible School, 1907-47

Samuel Frederick Coffman (11 June 1872 - 28 June 1954) was a Canadian minister, writer and pacifist.

In 1918 he helped organize the Non-Resistant Relief Organization (NRRO), involving all Amish, Mennonite, and Brethren-in-Christ groups then in Ontario. Coffman represented these peace groups in lobbying the Canadian government for exemption from military service during World War I. "He received a sympathetic hearing from many public officials largely because of his own judicious attitude and the general trust he put in the government." Coffman assisted in obtaining releases for imprisoned Amish and Brethren in Christ members, and as a more permanent solution he later arranged that conscientious objectors be given indefinite leaves of absence from active duty.

In the 1930s, Coffman helped to create the Conference of Historic Peace Churches. Out of his peace conviction grew the belief that the peace churches should assist in the relief of wounds caused by war:

"Throughout the years 1918-50, Coffman organized, through NRRO, the distribution of relief funds and materials to aid the victims of war. For him, relief work was the social dimension to the peace doctrine of nonresistance. Coffman interpreted the peace position to include not only resistance to war, but also a commitment to acts of love."
