= Ball's Falls, Ontario =

Conservation area in Ontario, Canada

Coordinates: 43.132654°N 79.383538°W

Ball's Falls, also known as Balls Mills, Louthe Mills and Glen Elgin, is a historical ghost town located in what is now a part of Jordan in the Niagara region, Ontario, Canada, which dates back to the early 19th century. It is now preserved as a conservation area operated by the Niagara Peninsula Conservation Authority.

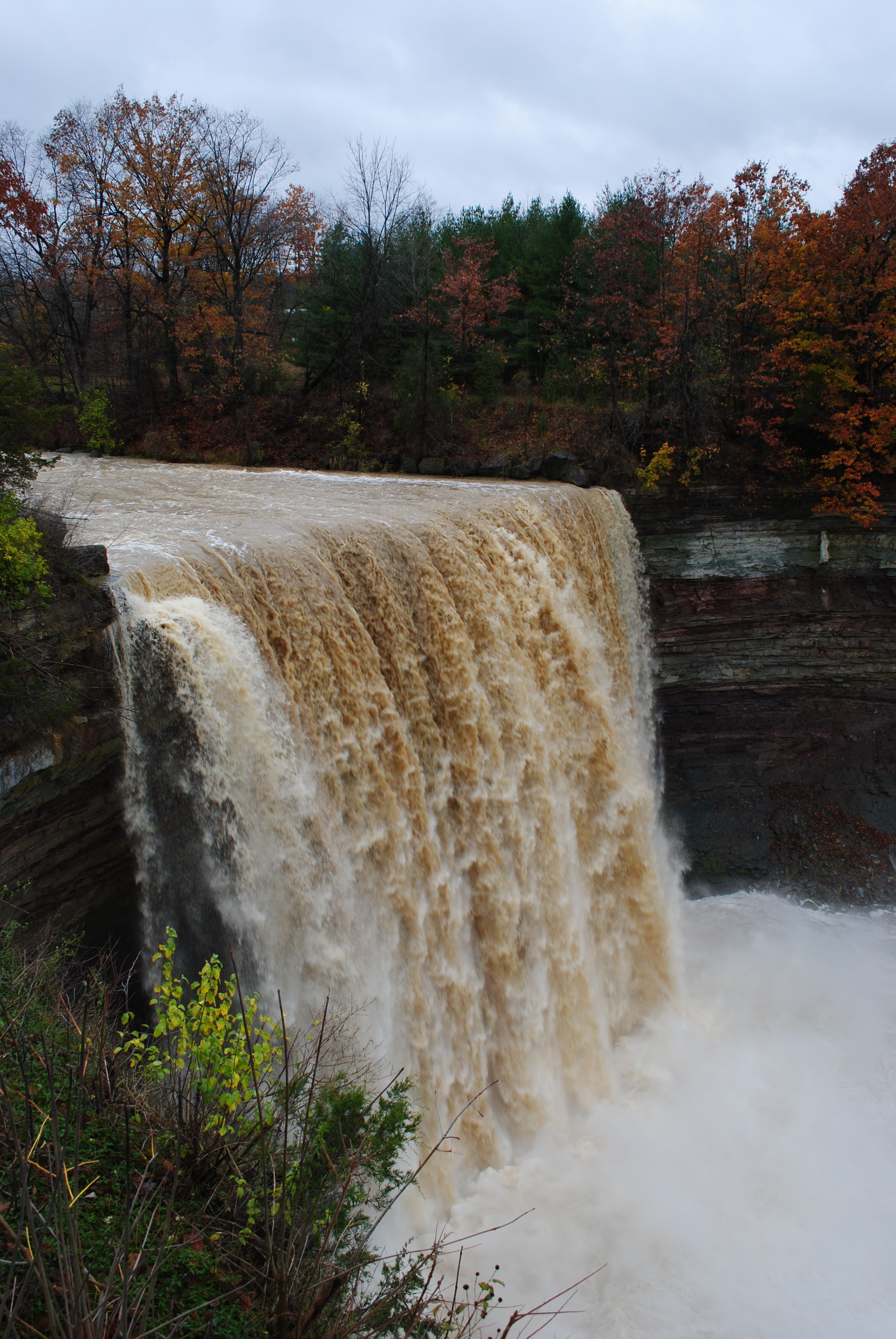
The namesake waterfall of Ball's Falls, Ontario

== History ==
The town was established in the early 19th century by John and George Ball, United Empire Loyalists.

The Ball or Bahl family had a long association with the English Crown, and had originally emigrated to the County of Norfolk in England from lands in what is now Germany. In 1690, the family purchased lands in New York's Mohawk Valley, paying one shilling per acre to the Crown. Subsequently, they emigrated and settled there.

During the American Revolution, the Ball family maintained their allegiance to the Crown. In 1782, Jacob moved to what is now Canada with most of his sons and fought with the Loyalist Butler's Rangers and Queen's Rangers militias for the remainder of the Revolutionary War. Jacob, a Captain in the Rangers, brought much of his company with him. The family received a land grant from the Crown in 1783, and the remainder of the family emigrated to Canada in the following year, 1784.

Two of Jacob's sons, John and George, purchased 1200 acres (486 ha) of land in Niagara in 1807 from Thomas Butler, brother of Col. John Butler. Twenty Mile Creek, which runs through the area, has two waterfalls. The Ball brothers built a grist mill, a saw mill at the lower falls and a woollen mill at the upper falls. During the War of 1812, the settlement was heavily utilized by the military, as part of a regiment was stationed there for a time.

The town began flourishing and soon a cooper, blacksmith, tailor, weaver and butcher lived on the land. By 1852 the population of the town, then Glen Elgin, grew to 19 inhabitants. In the late 1850s, the Great Western Railway was established and many moved away from Glen Elgin and were located closer to the railway. In 1962 Manly Ball sold the land to the Niagara Peninsula Conservation Area and the town, now known as Ball's Falls, is a tourist attraction.

== Geography ==
The Ball's Falls historic chapel

Located in the Niagara region of Ontario, Ball's Falls currently occupies around one sixth of the 1200 acres bought by the Ball brothers. It has a mild climate as a result of its location, which is south of Lake Ontario and north of Lake Erie. There are two waterfalls on Twenty Mile Creek. The upper falls are 35 feet (10.7 m) high, and the lower falls are 90 feet (27.4 m) high. ]The falls can be viewed from above and below. The gorge has also become an area of scientific interest. The lower falls pass over Irondequoit limestone, a firm layer over several weaker sandstone layers. The rock of the upper falls is formed of the same unit, the Lockport Formation, that forms the crest of Niagara Falls.

== Conservation ==
Thousands of plant and animal species grow throughout the conservation area. The list of plant species totals 471 and includes plants such as wild sarsaparilla, green and white trilliums, wild ginger, wild geranium, Virginia bluebells, Canada yew, arrowhead, wild leek, asparagus, wild yam, red mulberry, wild columbine, Canada anemone, chokecherry, Virginia creeper and St. John's wort. Ball's Falls is made up of hardwoods mixed with coniferous trees, lying within the deciduous forest zone. Tree species include Eastern cottonwood, butternut, black walnut, shagbark hickory, white oak, tulip tree and slippery elm. Rare species include sycamore, sassafras and pignut hickory. The species of fish living in Twenty Mile Creek include the largemouth bass, yellow perch, grass pickerel, rock bass, green sunfish, creek chub and pumpkinseed. Among the species of birds found at Ball's Falls are the eastern bluebird, indigo bunting, house sparrows, northern cardinals, mallards, killdeer.

== Today ==
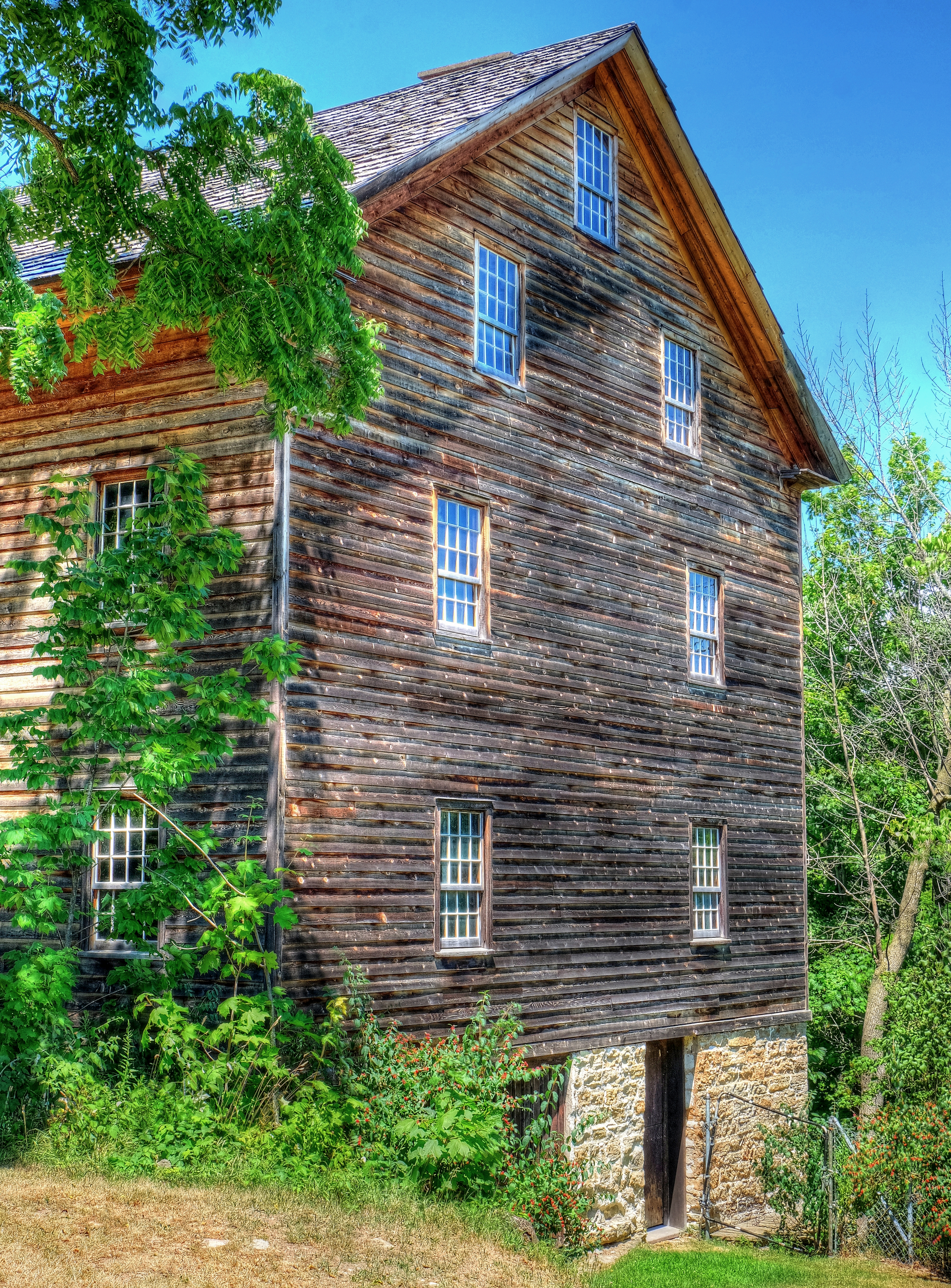
Ball's Grist Mill, built in 1809

After the purchase of Ball's Falls by the Niagara Peninsula Conservation Authority in 1962, the area became a conservation area. The park features the Ball's Falls Centre for Conservation to help visitors learn of the area's cultural and natural history. The building, designed to have a limited impact of the surrounding environment, features permanent and temporary galleries, exhibits and interactive displays, including the conservation practices of the Niagara Peninsula Conservation Authority, archaeological findings, and the watershed ecosystem of Twenty Mile Creek.

Still standing within the park are the original Ball family home, an operating gristmill, a lime kiln, a restored church, a blacksmith shop, and a carriage shed.
