= Moses F. Rittenhouse =

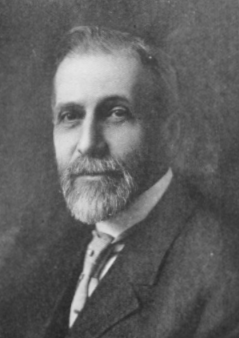
- Born: Moses Franklin Rittenhouse; 12 August 1846; Vineland, Canada West
- Died: 7 November 1915 (aged 69); Chicago, Illinois
- Occupation: Businessman
- Spouse: Emma Stover (m. 1871)

Moses Franklin Rittenhouse (12 August 1846 – 7 November 1915) was a Canadian-American businessman and philanthropist who made his fortune in the lumber business in Chicago after moving there in 1864.

== Biography ==
Moses F. Rittenhouse was born in Vineland, Canada West on 12 August 1846. He moved to Chicago in 1864, and entered the lumber business.

He married Emma Stover on 17 December 1871, and they had three children.

He died from heart failure in Chicago on 7 November 1915.

== Philanthropy ==
Rittenhouse's success in business allowed him to bestow upon his fellow citizens many other generous gifts which include a school, a recreation hall, and the resources necessary to create a library in Lincoln. Today, the Vineland branch of the Lincoln Public Library is named in his honour to reflect his long association with the library in Lincoln.

== Agriculture ==
He helped to establish the Vineland Research Station for research on growing tender fruit. His donation of land resulted in decades of useful horticultural research that has benefited many in and around the Niagara Peninsula.

Continuing the proud association Rittenhouse had established with the local fruit industry, his nephew, Moses K. Rittenhouse began building orchard sprayers from his barn in Jordan Station, soon after in 1914 establishing the company M. K. Rittenhouse. Today, Rittenhouse still provides spraying equipment and agricultural tools to local farmers, and there is scarcely a farm in the Niagara Region that does not, or has not in the past used a Rittenhouse sprayer.

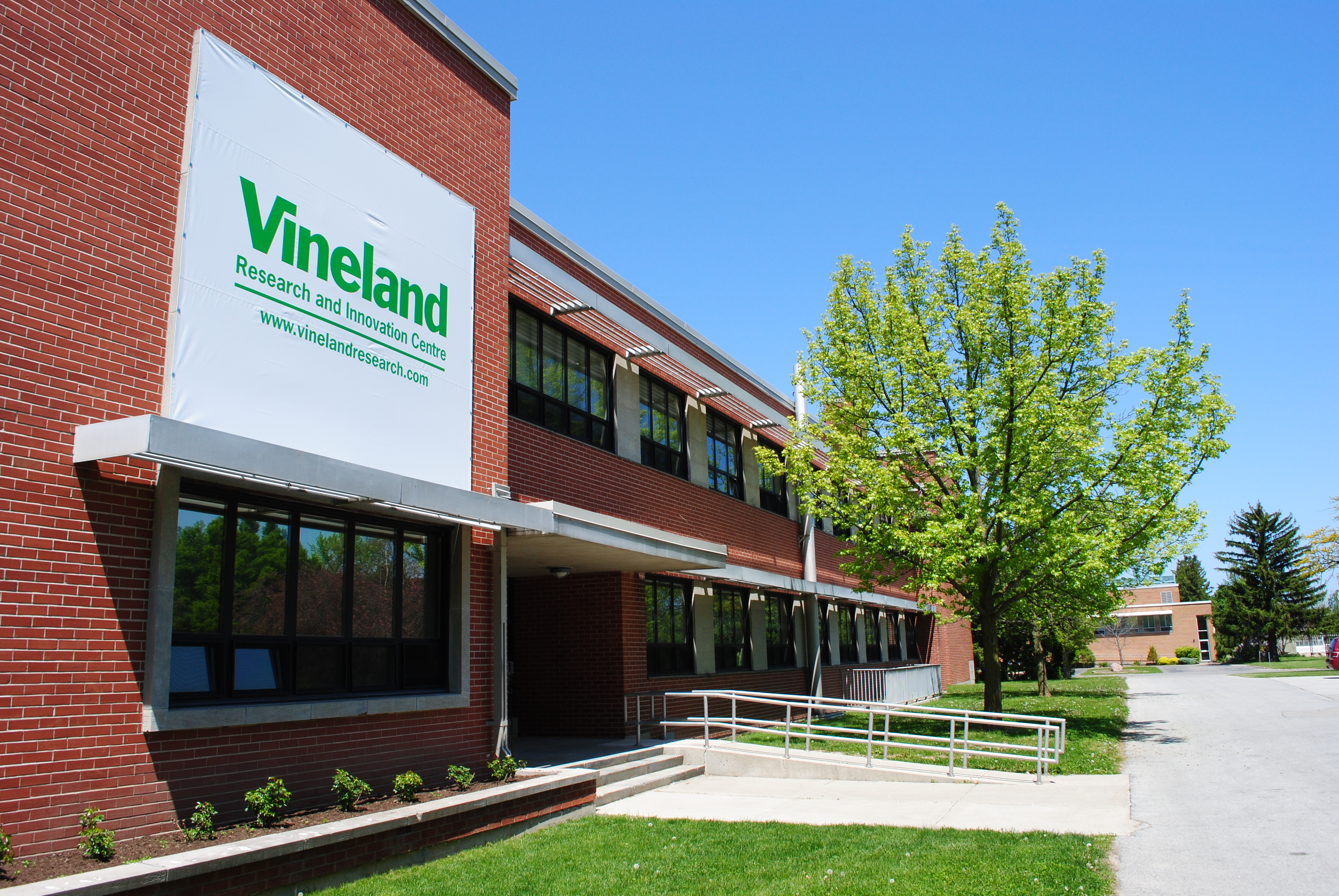
The Vineland Research and Innovation Centre as it appears today
