= Paul Laus =

Canadian ice hockey defenceman

- Born: September 26, 1970 (age 55) Beamsville, Ontario, Canada
- Height: 6 ft 1 in (185 cm)
- Weight: 215 lb (98 kg; 15 st 5 lb)
- Position: Defence
- Shot: Right
- Played for: Florida Panthers
- NHL draft: 37th overall, 1989; Pittsburgh Penguins
- Playing career: 1990–2002

Paul Laus (born September 26, 1970) is a Canadian former professional ice hockey defenceman who played in the National Hockey League for the Florida Panthers. Laus was the last original member of the Panthers.

== Career ==
Born in Beamsville, Ontario, Laus was a Junior B standout with the St. Catharines Falcons before joining the Ontario Hockey League. He spent three years with the Hamilton Steelhawks/Niagara Falls Thunder franchise and was selected 37th overall by the Pittsburgh Penguins at the 1989 NHL entry draft. He spent his first three years as a pro in the International Hockey League and ECHL, including a stint with the short-lived Albany Choppers.

The blueliner was claimed by the Florida Panthers in the 1993 NHL Expansion Draft. His defensive work set an NHL record for expansion teams with 83 points. Two years later, he scored two goals and was a workhorse in 21 games as the Panthers reached the Stanley Cup finals. Laus continued to be an enforcer and team leader through the end of the 2000–01 season and was the only person to play in all of the club's first eight seasons.

In the 1996–97 NHL season Laus set an NHL record with 39 fighting majors in 77 games while also setting career highs in assists, points, plus/minus, and penalty minutes.

However, injuries limited Laus to only 70 games over his last two seasons. After his latest wrist injury, in 2002, he never played another professional game. Eventually, Laus officially retired and moved back to Ontario.

== Records ==
- Holds the NHL record for most fighting majors in a season with 39, set during the 1996–97 season.
- Florida Panthers team record: Most career penalty minutes (1,702)

== Career statistics ==
			Regular season					Playoffs
Season	Team	League	GP	G	A	Pts	PIM	GP	G	A	Pts	PIM
1986–87	St. Catharines Falcons	GHL	40	1	8	9	56	—	—	—	—	—
1987–88	Hamilton Steelhawks	OHL	56	1	9	10	171	14	0	0	0	28
1988–89	Niagara Falls Thunder	OHL	49	1	10	11	225	15	0	5	5	56
1989–90	Niagara Falls Thunder	OHL	60	13	35	48	231	16	6	16	22	71
1990–91	Albany Choppers	IHL	7	0	0	0	7	—	—	—	—	—
1990–91	Knoxville Cherokees	ECHL	20	6	12	18	83	—	—	—	—	—
1990–91	Muskegon Lumberjacks	IHL	35	3	4	7	103	4	0	0	0	13
1991–92	Muskegon Lumberjacks	IHL	75	0	21	21	248	14	2	5	7	70
1992–93	Cleveland Lumberjacks	IHL	76	8	18	26	427	4	1	0	1	27
1993–94	Florida Panthers	NHL	39	2	0	2	109	—	—	—	—	—
1994–95	Florida Panthers	NHL	37	0	7	7	138	—	—	—	—	—
1995–96	Florida Panthers	NHL	78	3	6	9	236	21	2	6	8	62
1996–97	Florida Panthers	NHL	77	0	12	12	313	5	0	1	1	4
1997–98	Florida Panthers	NHL	77	0	11	11	293	—	—	—	—	—
1998–99	Florida Panthers	NHL	75	1	9	10	218	—	—	—	—	—
1999–2000	Florida Panthers	NHL	77	3	8	11	172	4	0	0	0	8
2000–01	Florida Panthers	NHL	25	1	2	3	66	—	—	—	—	—
2001–02	Florida Panthers	NHL	45	4	3	7	157	—	—	—	—	—
NHL totals			530	14	58	72	1702	30	2	7	9	74

Preceded by Scott Mellanby	Florida Panthers captain 2001–02 with Pavel Bure	Succeeded by Olli Jokinen
