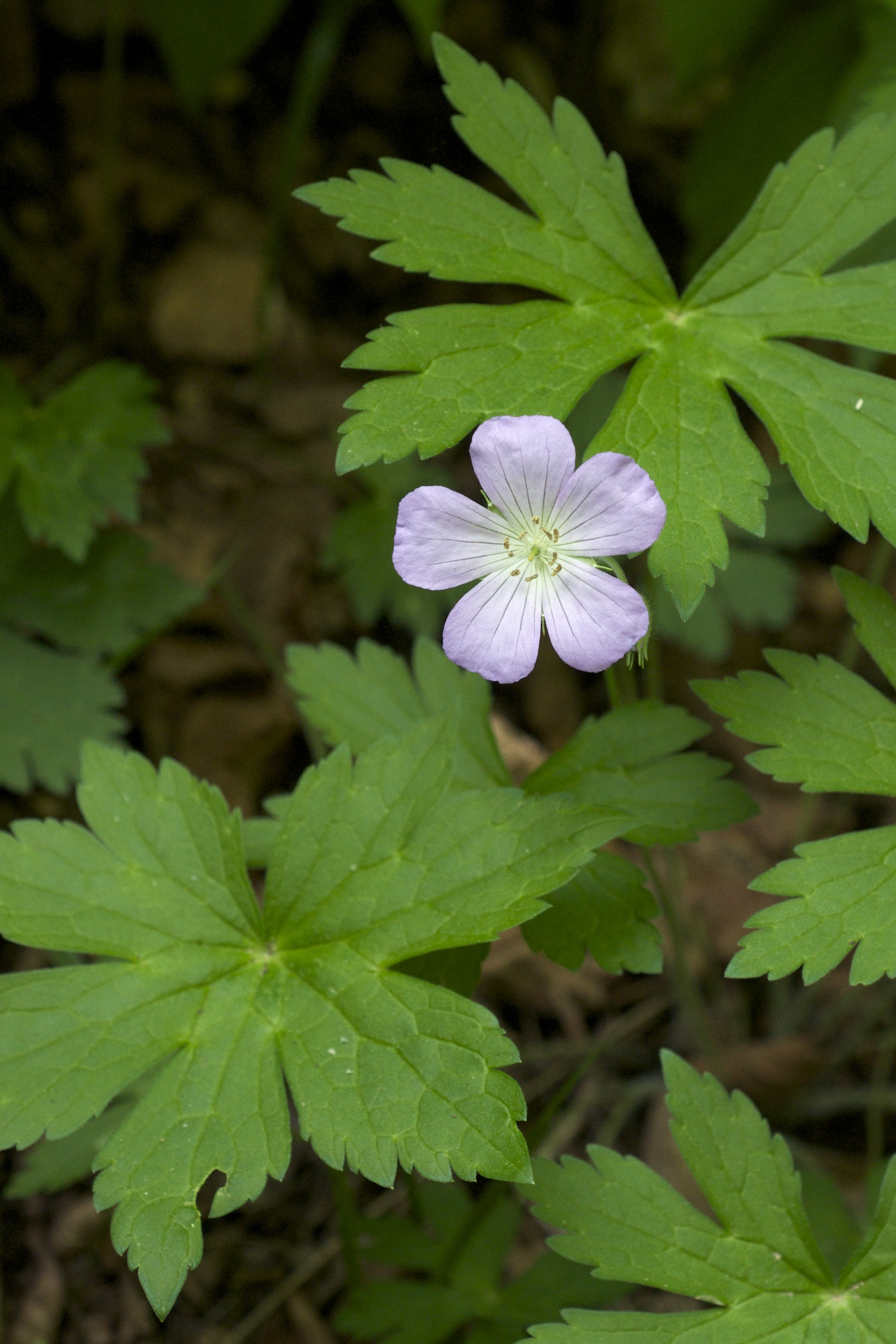

Conservation status
- Secure (NatureServe)

Scientific classification
- Kingdom: Plantae
- Clade: Embryophytes
- Clade: Tracheophytes
- Clade: Angiosperms
- Clade: Eudicots
- Clade: Rosids
- Order: Geraniales
- Family: Geraniaceae
- Genus: Geranium
- Species: G. maculatum

Binomial name
- Geranium maculatum L.

= Geranium maculatum =

Species of flowering plant

Geranium maculatum, the wild geranium, spotted geranium, or wood geranium, is a perennial plant native to woodlands in eastern North America, from southern Manitoba and southwestern Quebec south to Alabama and Georgia and west to Oklahoma and South Dakota.

== Names ==
It is known as spotted cranesbill or wild cranesbill in Europe, but the wood cranesbill is another plant, the related G. sylvaticum (a European native called "woodland geranium" in North America). Colloquial names are alum root, alum bloom and old maid's nightcap.

== Distribution ==
It grows in dry to moist woods and is normally abundant when found.

== Description ==
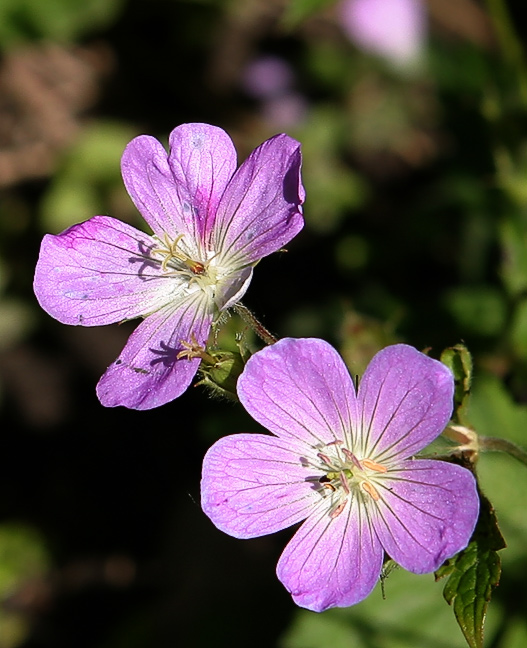
Flowers in late spring

It is a perennial herbaceous plant growing to 60 cm (2 ft) tall, producing upright, usually unbranched stems and flowers in spring to early summer. The leaves are palmately lobed with five or seven deeply cut lobes, 10–12.5 cm (4–5 in) broad, with a petiole up to 30 cm (12 in) long arising from the rootstock. They are deeply parted into three or five divisions, each of which is again cleft and toothed.

The flowers are 2.5–4 cm (1.0–1.6 in) in diameter, with five rose-purple, pale or violet-purple (rarely white) petals and ten stamens. In the Northern Hemisphere, they appear from April to June (precise dates depend on the latitude). They are grouped in loose corymbs or umbels of two to five at the top of the flower stems.

The fruit capsule, which springs open when ripe, consists of five cells each containing one seed joined to a long beak-like column 2–3 cm (0.8–1.2 in) long (resembling a crane's bill) produced from the center of the old flower.

The rhizome is long, and 5 to 10 cm (2 to 4 in) thick, with numerous branches. It is covered with scars, showing the remains of stems of previous years' growth. When dry it has a somewhat purplish color internally.

== Cultivation ==
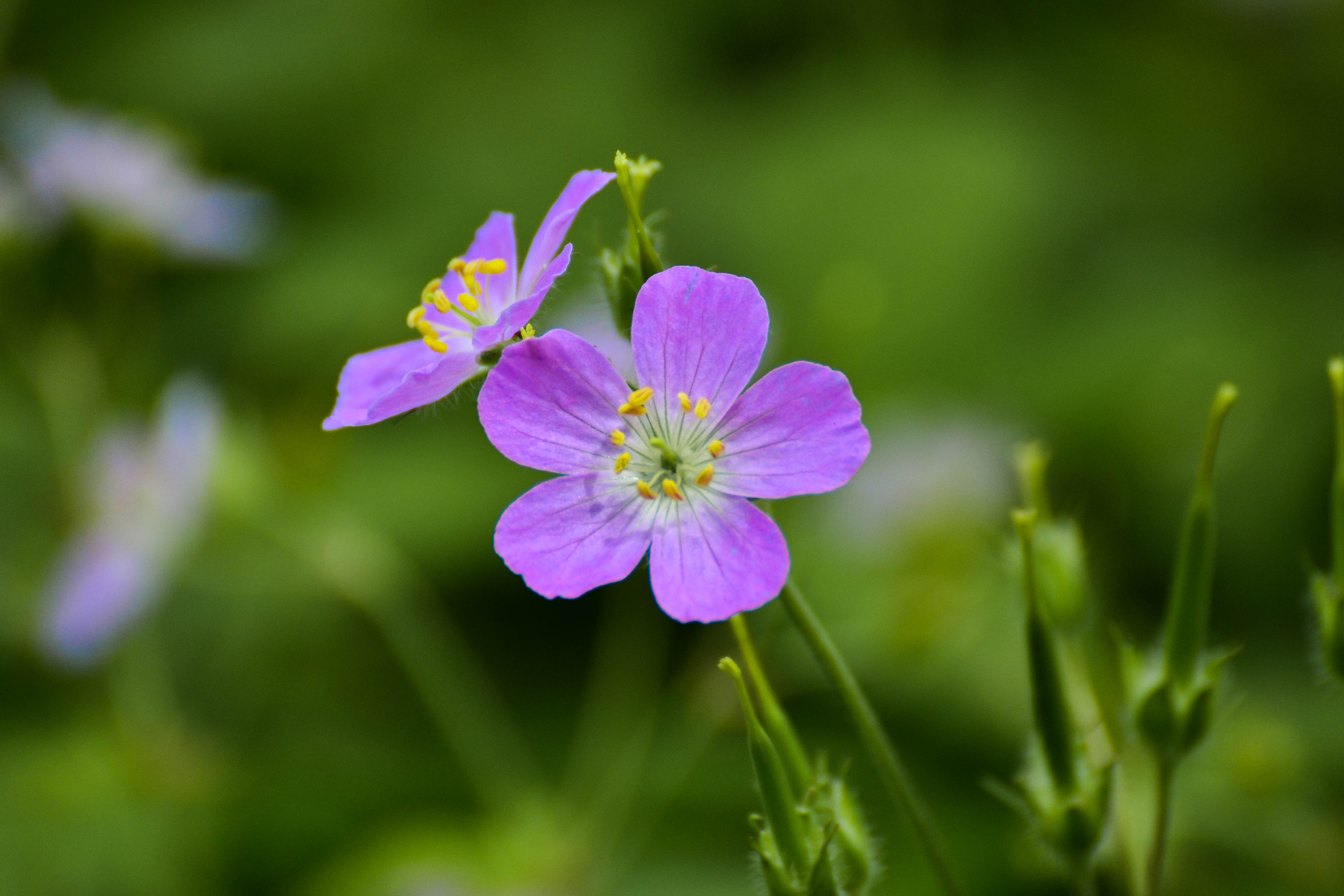
Wild Geranium flowers in spring in Massachusetts

The plant is well-known in cultivation, and numerous cultivars have been developed. The cultivar 'Elizabeth Ann' has gained the Royal Horticultural Society's Award of Garden Merit.

== Other uses ==
The plant has been used in herbal medicine, and is also grown as a garden plant. Wild geranium is considered an astringent, a substance that causes contraction of the tissues and stops bleeding. The Meskwaki brewed a root tea for toothache and for painful nerves and mashed the roots for treating hemorrhoids.
