= Twenty Mile Creek (Ontario) =

River in Ontario, Canada

Twenty Mile Creek Kenachdaw
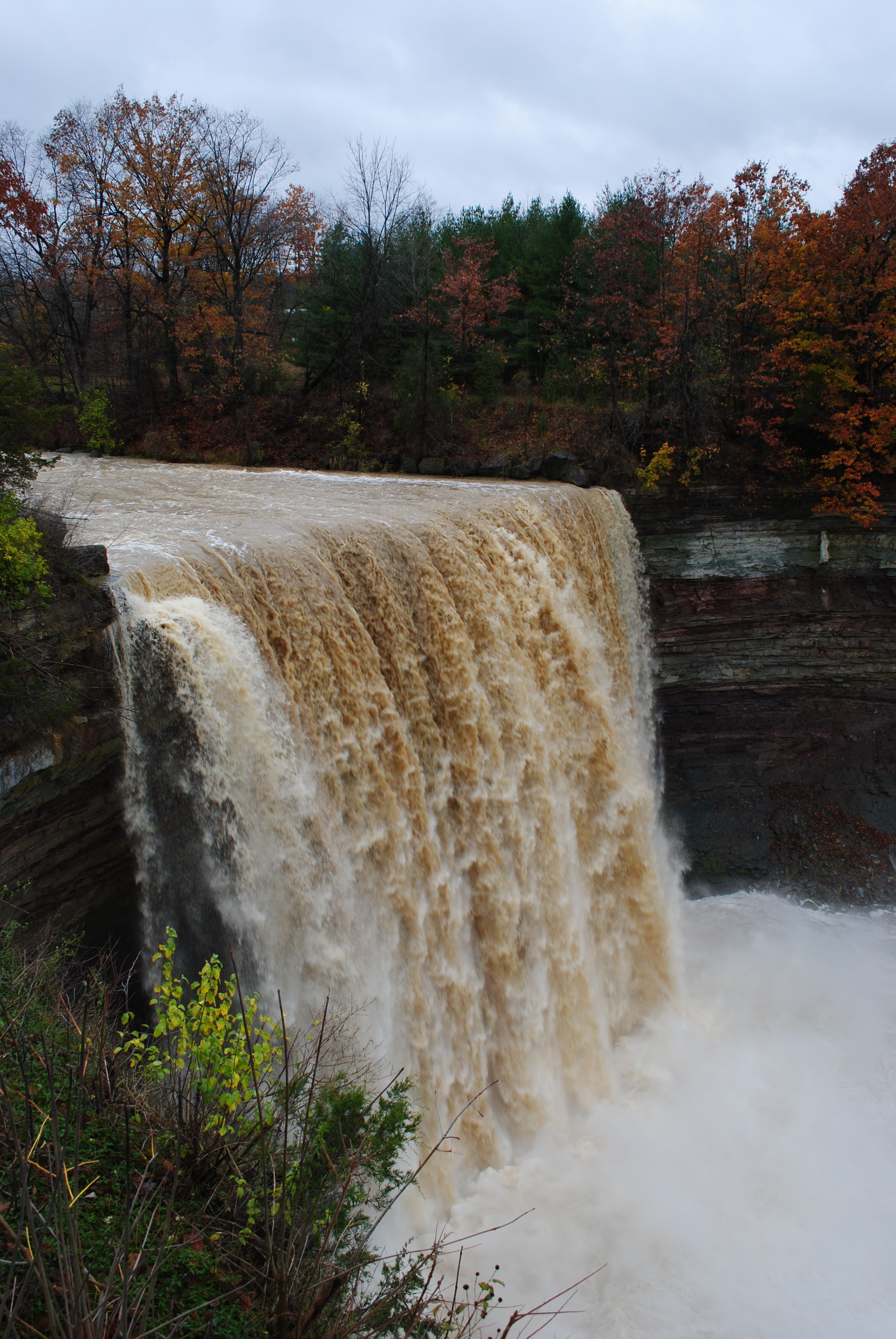
- The Twenty Mile Creek flows over Ball's Falls as it crosses the Niagara Escarpment

- Location of the mouth of the Twenty Mile Creek in southern Ontario
- Etymology: English: named for the location of its mouth, twenty miles west of the Niagara River
- Native name: Kenachdaw

Location
- Country: Canada
- Province: Ontario
- Region: Southern Ontario
- Regional Municipality: Niagara

Physical characteristics
- Source: Headwaters south of the City of Hamilton, near Hamilton International Airport
  - coordinates: 43°11′7″N 79°54′34″W
  - elevation: 238 m (781 ft)
- Mouth: Lake Ontario
  - location: Jordan Harbor
  - coordinates: 43°09′28″N 79°22′19″W
  - elevation: 74 m (243 ft)
- Length: 79 km (49 mi)
- Basin size: 291 km^{2} (112 sq mi)

Basin features
- River system: Great Lakes Basin
- Tributaries
  - left: Spring Creek, Black Creek, Sinkhole Creek, North Creek, Gavora Ditch

The Twenty Mile Creek is a minor waterway, located in the Niagara Peninsula, Ontario, Canada. The creek is named for the location of its mouth, twenty miles (32 km) west of the Niagara River along the Lake Ontario shoreline. It is also known by the Indigenous name for the creek, which is located within the Mississauga traditional territory, of Kenachdaw, which translates to Lead River.

== Watershed ==
The Twenty Mile Creek's watershed covers an area of 112 square miles (290 km^{2}) and is about 49 mi (79 km) in length. The creek begins at the headwaters above the Niagara escarpment in the City of Hamilton, rising near the Hamilton International Airport. From there the creek travels east above the escarpment, before turning north and crossing the Niagara Escarpment at Balls Falls, where it drops 83 feet (25 m). The creek eventually enters Lake Ontario at Jordan Harbour, after passing through the Jordan Marsh, which was created by lake waters flooding the lower reaches of the river valley. The Twenty Mile Creek watershed contains five sub-watersheds including the main channel of Twenty Mile Creek; Gavora Ditch, Spring Creek, North Creek and Sinkhole Creek.

The Twenty Mile Creek watershed contains several areas of natural and scientific interest, environmentally sensitive areas, and regionally significant wetlands. The upper reaches of the Twenty Mile Creek watershed are characterized by rolling topography with fairly steep slopes in the headwaters. Further downstream, the watershed contains gently rolling to flat topography before the creek flows over the Niagara Escarpment.

"Base flow in Twenty Mile Creek drops to zero during the summer months, although some water is retained in the channel pools. The low to non-existent summer flows may be due to a number of land use factors primarily resulting from agricultural expansion. These factors include a loss of water storage resulting from a decrease in the amount of forested areas, soil compaction, soil loss, and tile drainage. There may also be natural surface water losses via bedrock fractures and karst features."

== Navigation ==
Historically, the Twenty Mile Creek has been navigable by small craft and canoe as far upriver as Smithville, with the use of portages, most notably around the cataracts at Ball's Falls. In recent years, rafters, kayakers, and canoes have navigated the rapids above and below Ball's Falls (including Upper Ball's Falls (36")), although the 25-metre (83 ft) main cataract has yet to be attempted. The rapids rate a Class II to Class V (depending on river level) on the International Scale of River Difficulty.

== Settlements ==
The waterway played an essential role in the development of the communities on its banks. Smithville, St. Anns, and Jordan all owe their early activity to industry based upon the creek. The ghost town of Ball's Falls' development was also due to its location on the Twenty.

== Terrorism plot affiliated with Al Qaeda ==
The Canadian National trestle bridge near Jordan was allegedly the subject of a terror plot in early 2013. The alleged plot involved an attempt by Chiheb Esseghaier and Raed Jaser, both non-citizen residents of Canada, to derail the daily New York-Toronto passenger train as it crossed the trestle. The two men were allegedly affiliates of an Al-Qaeda group operating out of Iran.

== See also ==
- List of rivers of Ontario
