= Dean Allison =

Canadian politician (born 1965)

Dean Allison MP
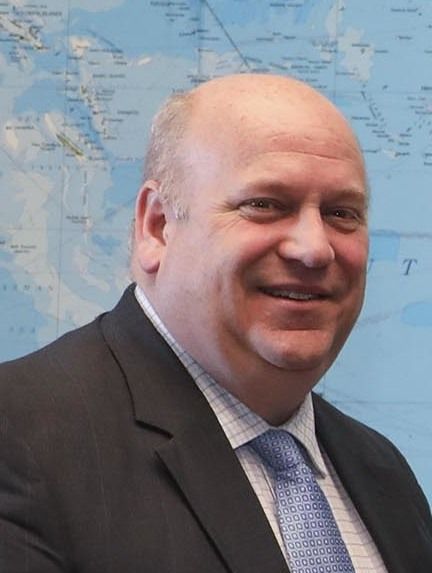

Member of Parliament for Niagara West Niagara West-Glanbrook (2004-2015)
- Incumbent
- Assumed office June 28, 2004
- Preceded by: Riding Established

Personal details
- Born: February 18, 1965 (age 61) London, Ontario, Canada
- Party: Conservative
- Profession: businessman, entrepreneur, restaurant owner

Dean Allison MP (born February 18, 1965, in London, Ontario) is a Canadian politician. He was elected to the House of Commons in the 2004 federal election for the riding of Niagara West—Glanbrook, now Niagara West. Allison is a member of the Conservative Party of Canada and has been re-elected in each subsequent election.

== Community involvement ==
Allison is a founding member of the Dave Thomas Foundation for Adoption in Canada and the Belarus' Children of Chernobyl program that brings children affected by the Chernobyl disaster to Canada.

At the time of the 2025 Canadian federal election, he lived in Fenwick, Ontario.

== Political career ==
Allison first ran for federal politics as the Canadian Alliance candidate in the Erie-Lincoln riding in 2000. Allison received 37.1% of the vote but was defeated by Liberal candidate John Maloney who received 42.2% of the votes.

Allison ran, and was elected, in the 2004 election as the Conservative candidate for Niagara West-Glanbrook. Allison has won the subsequent federal elections for Niagara West-Glanbrook.

In 2015, as a result of riding redistribution, the name was changed to Niagara West. The riding now consists of Grimsby, Lincoln, West Lincoln, Wainfleet, Pelham and a portion of west St. Catharines. In the 2025 federal election, Allison won his eighth consecutive election and returned to the House of Commons as the MP for Niagara West.

=== Member of Parliament ===
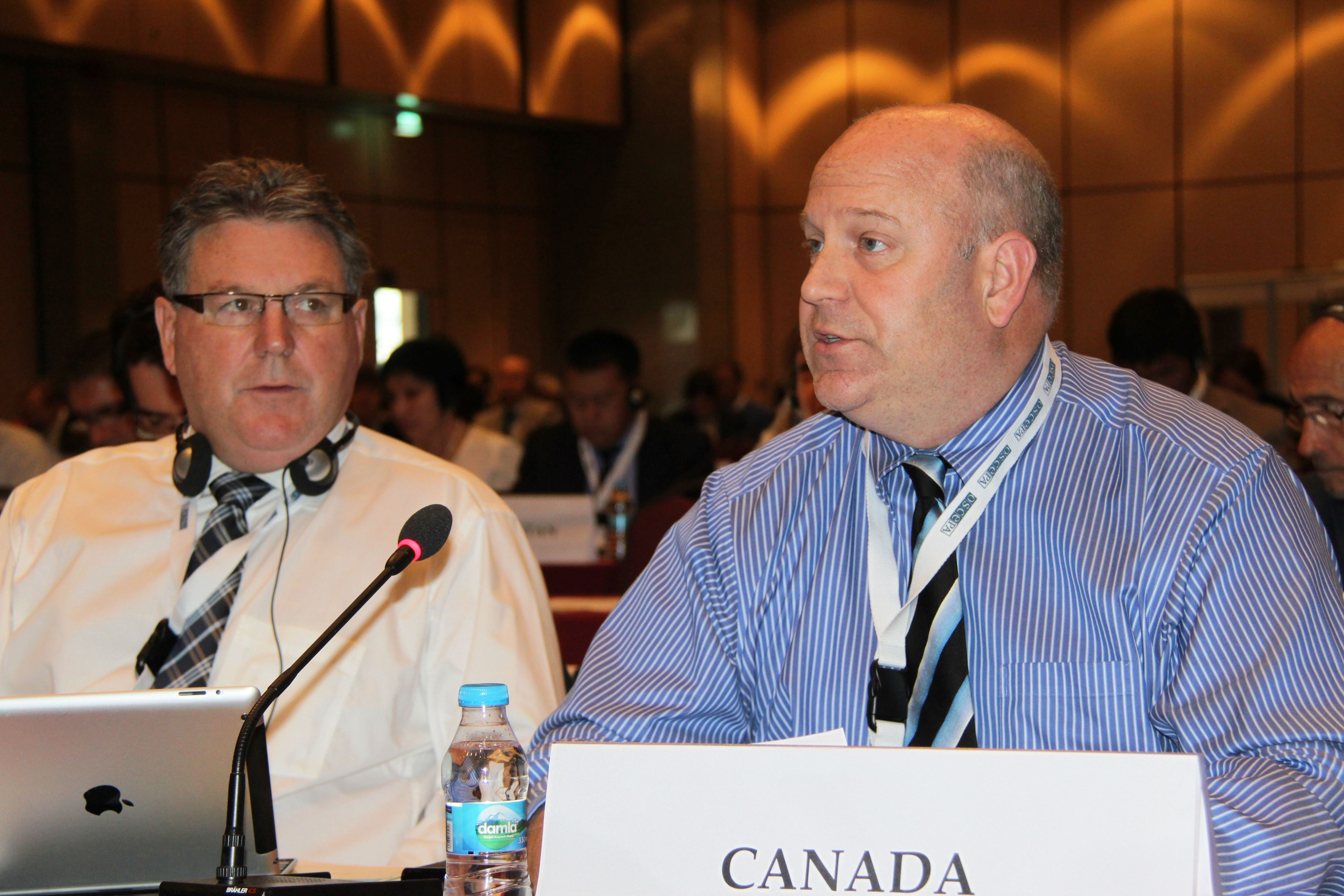
M.P. Dean Allison and Phil McColeman as 2013 Canadian delegation attended the Parliamentary Assembly of the Organization for Security and Co-operation in Europe’s Annual Session

Since taking office, Allison has served on the Standing Committee on Public Accounts, International Trade and as past chair of the Standing Committee on Human Resources Skills Development and Status of Persons with Disabilities and has also served on the advisory panel on the Funding of Officers of Parliament. He has also served as vice chair of the Ontario Conservative Caucus and been on the executive of the Intraparliamentary Union Association and the Commonwealth Association.

In the 42nd Parliament, Allison served as the Shadow Minister for International Trade as well as the vice-chair of Standing Committee on International Trade.

Allison is also a director of the Organization for Security and Cooperation in Europe Parliamentary Assembly.

Allison has tabled a number of different legislative initiatives in Parliament including a bill aimed at removing the faint hope clause from the Criminal Code, and motions to entrench property rights in the Canadian Charter of Rights and Freedoms and to raise awareness of anaphylaxis.

Allison was one of thirteen Canadians banned from traveling to Russia under retaliatory sanctions imposed by Russian president Vladimir Putin in March 2014.

After the House of Commons introduced a vaccine mandate, Allison claimed a medical exemption. He attended House meetings virtually.

In February 2023, Allison, along with fellow Conservative MPs Leslyn Lewis and Colin Carrie, had dinner with Christine Anderson, a Member of the European Parliament representing Alternative for Germany, who was on a Canadian tour of right-wing media and convoy protest supporters. The meeting was condemned by the Centre for Israel and Jewish Affairs, the Canadian Anti-Hate Network, and Prime Minister Justin Trudeau among others, for Anderson and AfD's Islamophobic and antisemitic positions. Conservative leader Pierre Poilievre also denounced Anderson's views as "vile", racist, and said that "it would be better if Anderson never visited Canada in the first place". The three MPs released a joint-statement saying that while meetings with foreign elected officials are ordinary, they were unaware of her or her party's views, and that they condemned racist and hateful views.

Allison was re-elected in the 2025 election with over 50% of the vote.

== Electoral record ==
2025 Canadian federal election: Niagara West
Party	Candidate	Votes	%	±%	Expenditures
Conservative	Dean Allison	36,418	51.72	+7.69	$132,912.12
Liberal	Jennifer Korstanje	30,424	43.21	+12.16	$70,905.17
New Democratic	Justin Abando	2,262	3.21	–10.76	$138.45
Christian Heritage	Dave Bylsma	727	1.03	–0.02	$19,152.52
People's	Ryan Anderson	582	0.83	–6.26	$634.13
Total valid votes/expense limit		70,761	99.51	–	$138,631.95
Total rejected ballots		348	0.49		
Turnout		71,109	76.12		
Eligible voters		93,414			
Conservative notional hold		Swing		–2.07	
Source: Elections Canada

2021 Canadian federal election: Niagara West
Party	Candidate	Votes	%	±%	Expenditures
Conservative	Dean Allison	25,206	45.6	+0.2	
Liberal	Ian Bingham	16,815	30.4	-1.9	
New Democratic	Nameer Rahman	7,064	12.8	+0.7	
People's	Shaunalee Derkson	3,933	7.1	+5.5	
Green	Joanna Kocsis	1,602	2.9	-3.8	
Christian Heritage	Harold Jonker	657	1.2	-0.7	
Total valid votes		55,277	99.6		
Total rejected ballots		217	0.4		
Turnout		55,494	71.6		
Eligible voters		77,484			
Conservative hold		Swing		+1.1	
Source: Elections Canada

2019 Canadian federal election: Niagara West
Party	Candidate	Votes	%	±%	Expenditures
Conservative	Dean Allison	24,447	45.4	-3.42	$86,960.67
Liberal	Ian Bingham	17,429	32.3	-0.43	$77,942.53
New Democratic	Nameer Rahman	6,540	12.1	+0.65	none listed
Green	Terry Teather	3,620	6.7	+3.72	$4,788.88
Christian Heritage	Harold Jonker	1,019	1.9	-0.54	$16,035.83
People's	Miles Morton	869	1.6		none listed
Total valid votes/expense limit		53,924	100.0		
Total rejected ballots		252			
Turnout		54,176	72.5		
Eligible voters		74,760			
Conservative hold		Swing		-2.99	
Source: Elections Canada

2015 Canadian federal election: Niagara West (federal electoral district)
Party	Candidate	Votes	%	±%	Expenditures
Conservative	Dean Allison	24,732	48.82	-10.64	$81,875.54
Liberal	Phil Rose	16,581	32.73	+18.44	$55,489.05
New Democratic	Nameer Rahman	5,802	11.45	-7.76	$12,449.14
Green	Sid Frere	1,511	2.98	-1.53	$990.69
Christian Heritage	Harold Jonker	1,234	2.44	–	$21,772.10
Libertarian	Allan de Roo	797	1.57	–	–
Total valid votes/expense limit		50,657	100.00		$202,783.01
Total rejected ballots		242	0.48	–	
Turnout		50,889	73.83	–	
Eligible voters		68,937			
Conservative hold		Swing		-14.54	
Source: Elections Canada

2011 Canadian federal election
Party	Candidate	Votes	%	±%
Conservative	Dean Allison	33,701	57.3%	+5.33%
New Democratic	David Heatley	12,734	21.6%	+6.84%
Liberal	Stephen Bieda	8,699	14.8%	-9.17%
Green	Sid Frere	2,530	4.3%	-2.91%
Christian Heritage	Bryan Jongbloed	1,199	2%	-0.06%
Total valid votes		58,863	100%	

Source: Elections Canada

2008 Canadian federal election
Party	Candidate	Votes	%	±%
Conservative	Dean Allison	28,089	52.0%	+4.60%
Liberal	Heather Carter	12,955	24.0%	-6.71%
New Democratic	Dave Heatley	7,980	14.8%	-1.26%
Green	Sid Frere	3,897	7.2%	+3.26%
Christian Heritage	Dave Bylsma	1,118	2.1%	+0.17%
Total valid votes		54,039		

2006 Canadian federal election
Party	Candidate	Votes	%	±%
Conservative	Dean Allison	27,351	47.4%	+7.09%
Liberal	Heather Carter	17,712	30.7%	-8.32%
New Democratic	Dave Heatley	9,251	16.0%	+1.20%
Green	Tom Ferguson	2,284	4.0%	+0.56%
Christian Heritage	David W. Bylsma	1,132	2.0%	-0.17%
Total valid votes		57,730		

2004 Canadian federal election
Party	Candidate	Votes
Conservative	Dean Allison	20,874
Liberal	Debbie Zimmerman	20,210
New Democratic	Dave Heatley	7,681
Green	Tom Ferguson	1,761
Christian Heritage	David Bylsma	1,107
Canadian Action	Phil Rose	179
Total valid votes		51,812

2000 Canadian federal election
Party	Candidate	Votes
Liberal	John Maloney	17,054
Alliance	Dean Allison	14,992
Progressive Conservative	David Hurren	5,174
New Democratic	Jody Di Bartolomeo	2,423
Christian Heritage	David W. Blysma	476
Natural Law	John Gregory	143
Canadian Action	William Schleich	137

== Broadcasting career ==
Allison hosted a program on the conservative-leaning news channel The News Forum, The Hill Update.
