= Ontario Highway 55 =

Former Ontario provincial highway

King's Highway 55
- Niagara Regional Road 55; Niagara Stone Road; Black Swamp Road
- Highway 55 highlighted in red.

Route information
- Maintained by the Regional Municipality of Niagara
- Length: 12.9 km (8.0 mi)
- Existed: November 5, 1970–April 1, 1997

Major junctions
- South end: Regional Road 81 (Queenston Street / York Road) – St. Catharines
- Regional Road 100 (Four Mile Creek Road) – Virgil
- North end: Regional Road 87 (Mary Street) – Niagara-on-the-Lake

Location
- Country: Canada
- Province: Ontario
- Major cities: Niagara-on-the-Lake

Highway system
- Ontario provincial highways; Current; Former; 400-series
← Highway 49	→ Highway 58
Former provincial highways
← Highway 54	Highway 56 →

King's Highway 55, commonly referred to as Highway 55 and historically as the Niagara Stone Road and Black Swamp Road, was a provincially maintained highway in the Canadian province of Ontario, which connected the Queen Elizabeth Way (QEW) with Niagara-on-the-Lake, following Niagara Stone Road. The route divided a swath of wineries at the foot of the Niagara Escarpment, passing at an oblique angle to the concession road grid.

A former Highway 55 designation connected Highway 6 with Highway 53, passing through the Mountain district of Hamilton. The more recent designation was applied in 1970, following the establishment of the Regional Municipality of Niagara. On April 1, 1997, Highway 55 was transferred to Niagara and designated as Niagara Regional Road 55.

== Route description ==
Highway 55 began at an intersection with the old Iroquois Trail, now known as Queenston Street to the west and York Road to the east. This road was part of Highway 8 until 1970, when it was transferred to the Niagara Region and redesignated Niagara Regional Road 81. The roadway that carried Highway 55 continued south of this intersection as Taylor Road (Niagara Regional Road 70). Continuing north, the highway passed beneath the QEW, which ascends over the Welland Canal on the Garden City Skyway. The highway entered Homer, then curved northeast and entered farmland. From here to its northern terminus, the highway was completely straight. It passed south of the St. Catharines/Niagara District Airport and later intersected Niagara Regional Road 106.

Highway 55 passes through the small town of Virgil, which is centred on the Four Mile Creek. It intersected Four Mile Creek Road (Niagara Regional Road 100) in the centre of the town, then entered back into an agricultural area. Shortly thereafter, the highway entered the urban area of Niagara-on-the-Lake, where it ended at Mary Street (Niagara Regional Road 87).

Several wineries are established along the former route of Highway 55, most notably the Jackson-Triggs Estate.

== History ==
A former Highway 55 designation connected Highway 6 and the QEW with Highway 53, passing through the Mountain district of Hamilton; this route was decommissioned in 1961. The more recent designation was applied in late 1970, following the establishment of the Niagara Region.

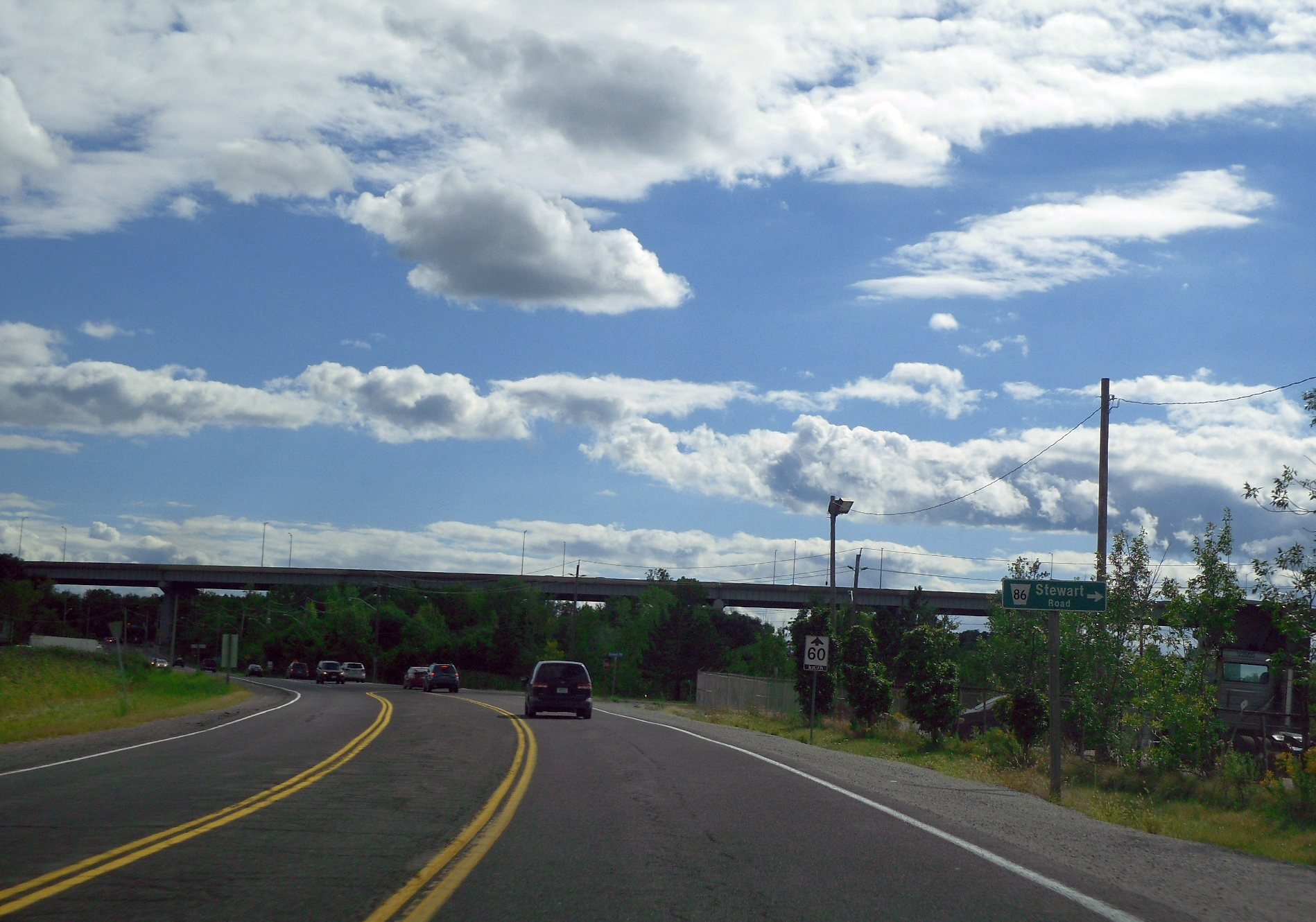
Highway 55 ended near the QEW, pictured in the background rising onto the Garden City Skyway.

During the initial settlement period of the Niagara area, following the American Revolutionary War, new wagon routes were built over native footpaths. Grimsby and Newark (now Niagara-on-the-Lake) quickly became established settlements, but travel was cumbersome between them. Pioneers were forced to travel south along the Niagara Road to Queenston, where they turned west and followed the Iroquois Road. To remedy the situation, locals gathered in 1798 and constructed the Black Swamp Road to connect Newark with the Iroquois Road near its crossing of Ten Mile Creek (now the location of the Welland Canal). The route, often subject to flooding from the waterlogged soil over which it travelled, was gradually improved, especially during the 1830s. In the late 1840s, the Niagara and Ten Mile Creek Plank Road Company planked the length of the road. During the latter half of the 1800s, the road was macadamized, and gradually came to be known as the Niagara Stone Road as the surrounding swampland was drained and farmed.

The original incarnation of Highway 55 travelled through Hamilton. It was established in 1937, following Upper Gage Avenue north from Rymal Road (itself designated Highway 53 that same year) to Crockett Avenue and the Sherman Access. It turned west and followed the access down the Niagara Escarpment, ending at Highway 6 (John Street). The route of this highway changed several times through the late 1950s as the Burlington Skyway was constructed. By 1959, a route down the new Kenilworth Access, north along Kenilworth Avenue and along what is now Burlington Street to the QEW was designated as Highway 55; both routes existed simultaneously between 1957 and 1958. By 1961, this route had been decommissioned.

The recent incarnation of Highway 55 was established following the release of the Niagara Peninsula Planning Study in 1964, which recommended that the province take jurisdiction of the Niagara Stone Road (then designated Lincoln County Road 3). It was subsequently assumed on November 5, 1970, the same year the Regional Municipality of Niagara was formed. The route followed the entire length of the Niagara Stone Road from Homer to Niagara-on-the-Lake and remained unchanged over its 27 years of existence. Highway 55 was transferred to the Regional Municipality of Niagara on April 1, 1997, as part of the first round of mass downloading. It is now designated as Niagara Regional Road 55. The majority of the former route is named the Niagara Stone Road; within Niagara-on-the-Lake, it is named Mississauga Street.

== Major intersections ==
Highway 55 is now known as Niagara Regional Road 55.

The following table lists the major junctions along Highway 55, as noted by the Ministry of Transportation of Ontario. The entire route was located in the Regional Municipality of Niagara.

Location	km	mi	Destinations	Notes
Homer	0.0	0.0	Regional Road 81 (Queenston Street / York Road)	Continues south as Regional Road 70 (Taylor Road)
Homer	0.3	0.19	Regional Road 86 (Stewart Road)	
Niagara-on-the-Lake	5.3	3.3	Regional Road 83 (Carlton Street)	
Niagara-on-the-Lake	8.2	5.1	Regional Road 100 (Four Mile Creek Road)	
Niagara-on-the-Lake	10.1	6.3	East & West Line	
Niagara-on-the-Lake	12.9	8.0	Regional Road 87 (Mary Street)	Continues northeast as Mississauga Street
1.000 mi = 1.609 km; 1.000 km = 0.621 mi
