= Skyway Bridge =

Skyway Bridge may refer to:

- Buffalo Skyway, a bridge in Buffalo, New York, United States
- Burlington Bay Skyway, a bridge near Burlington, Ontario, Canada
- Garden City Skyway, a bridge in St. Catharines, Ontario, Canada
- Chicago Skyway, a bridge in Chicago, Illinois, United States
- Pulaski Skyway, a bridge in Newark, New Jersey, United States
- Sunshine Skyway Bridge, over Tampa Bay in Florida, United States
- Veterans' Glass City Skyway, a bridge in Toledo, Ohio, United States
