= Julian Smith =

Julian Smith may refer to:

- Julian C. Smith (1885–1975), United States Marine Corps general
- Julian Cleveland Smith (1878–1939), American-Canadian engineer and business executive
- Julian Sinclair Smith (1920–1993), American electrical engineer and television executive
- Julian Smith (politician) (born 1971), British MP and Former Northern Ireland Secretary
- Julian Smith (saxophonist) (born 1969), contestant on the third series of Britain's Got Talent
- Julian Smith (author) (born 1972), American author
- Julian Smith (boxer) (born 1990), American boxer
- Julian Smith (footballer) (born 1967), Bahamian soccer defender
- Julian Smith (photographer) (1873–1947), British-born Australian surgeon and Pictorialist photographer
- Julian Smith, British businessman, co-founder of Opes Prime
- Julian Smith (publisher) (born 1943), New Zealand businessperson

== See also ==
- Julian Horn-Smith (born 1948), British businessman
