= Robert Melville Smith =

Robert Melville Smith

Robert Melville Smith (14 October 1887 – 16 November 1950) was a civil engineer, who, as deputy minister of the Ontario Department of Highways (now the Ministry of Transportation) between 1928 and 1943, designed and constructed the Queen Elizabeth Way, the first divided intercity highway in North America.

== Biography ==
Smith was born at Kingston, Ontario, on 14 October 1887, the son of Robert W and Jennie Reid Smith. He studied civil engineering at Queen's University at Kingston, graduating in 1914. He was Chief Engineer of the Ontario Highways Department, and Acting Deputy Minister from February 1927, when he was appointed as Deputy Minister on 1 January 1928. In 1934, following provincial elections, the new Ontario Highways Minister Thomas McQuesten discussed with Smith the new concept of "dual-lane divided highways," based on the German autobahns, and decided that the highway known as the Middle Road would be converted into the new form of highway. Smith modified the design for Ontario roads. When it opened at the end of 1937, it was the first intercity divided highway in North America, preceding the Pennsylvania Turnpike, the first U.S. intercity divided highway, by one year.

Smith was also a consultant and contractor on projects such as the Grand River Conservation Commission and the Alaska Highway, through his company R. Melville Smith Co. Ltd, and the Canada Culvert Co. Ltd, Toronto, of which he was president.

In 1942, Smith was awarded the Julian C. Smith Medal b they Engineering Institute of Canada "for achievement in the development of Canada." The citation read, "The successful development of the admirable highway system of Ontario during the past twenty years has been in no small measure due to the supervisory work of Robert Melville Smith, first as chief engineer and then deputy minister of highways, and since 1935 as deputy minister of the combined Departments of Highways and Northern Development. In these capacities his administration has been far-sighted and economical... he has gained a well-earned reputation as one of the leading Canadian authorities on highway problems. He has indeed 'rendered outstanding service in furthering the development of Canada'."

Smith resigned as Deputy Minister in 1943 because of ill health, and died at his home in Toronto on 16 November 1950. He had been married twice, firstly, in 1915, to Clara Mabel Sargent, who died in 1916, and secondly in 1919 to Margueretta Lucy, with whom he had two children.
