= The Middle Road =

Historic highway in Ontario

Middle Road
- Queen Street extension

Route information
- Maintained by Ontario Department of Highways
- Length: 61.6 km (38.3 mi)
- History: Constructed 1931–1939 renamed the Queen Elizabeth Way

Major junctions
- West end: Highway 20 (Plains Road) – Burlington
- Highway 10 (Hurontario Street) – Port Credit; Highway 27 (Brown's Line) – Long Branch
- East end: Highway 2 (Lake Shore Boulevard) – Toronto

Location
- Country: Canada
- Province: Ontario

Highway system
- Roads in Ontario

The Middle Road was the name for a historic highway in the Canadian province of Ontario, which served to link the cities of Toronto and Hamilton. The name was used between 1931 and 1939, after which the road became the northern section of the Queen Elizabeth Way. It borrowed the name of Middle Road from a concession road in Toronto Township between 1st Concession South and 2nd Concession South during the early 1800s.

The Middle Road was initially constructed as a depression relief project, employing 74 men to grade and widen the country lane into a four lane roadway. In 1934, the concept was reworked by Thomas McQuesten and Robert Melville Smith into a divided, limited access freeway, the first such intercity stretch in North America when it was opened in 1939. (Note: While the Long Island Parkway and several similar roadways opened in the late twenties and early thirties, these parkways were designed to move traffic in and out of a city's downtown. The Middle Road was designed to provide travel between cities, and opened a year before the Pennsylvania Turnpike, the first U.S. highway to do this.)

The Middle Road provided the blueprint for Highway 401, an expressway that became a key contributor to the economic success of Ontario.

== Route description ==
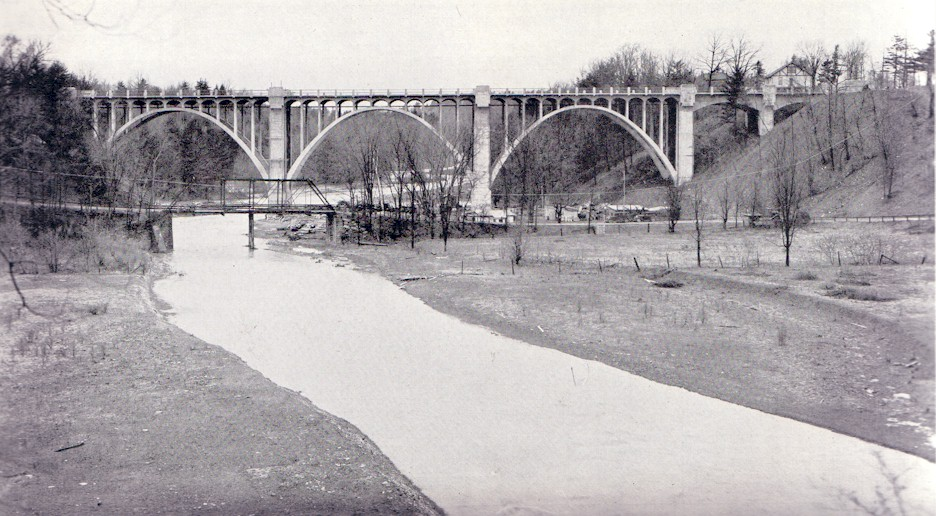
Bronte Creek Bridge, 1936. The old Middle Road bridge is visible in the foreground.

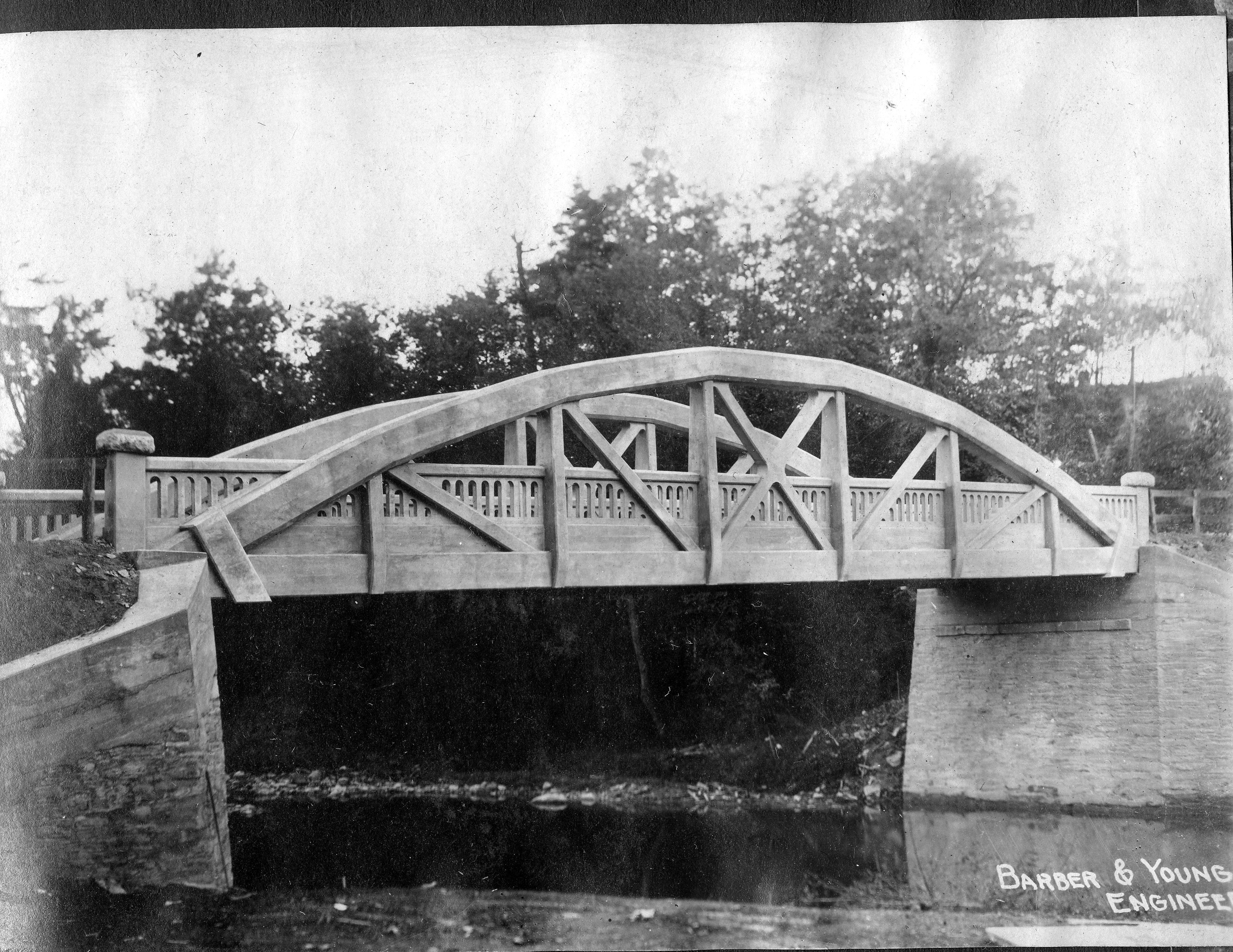
The Middle Road Bridge over the Etobicoke Creek in 1910

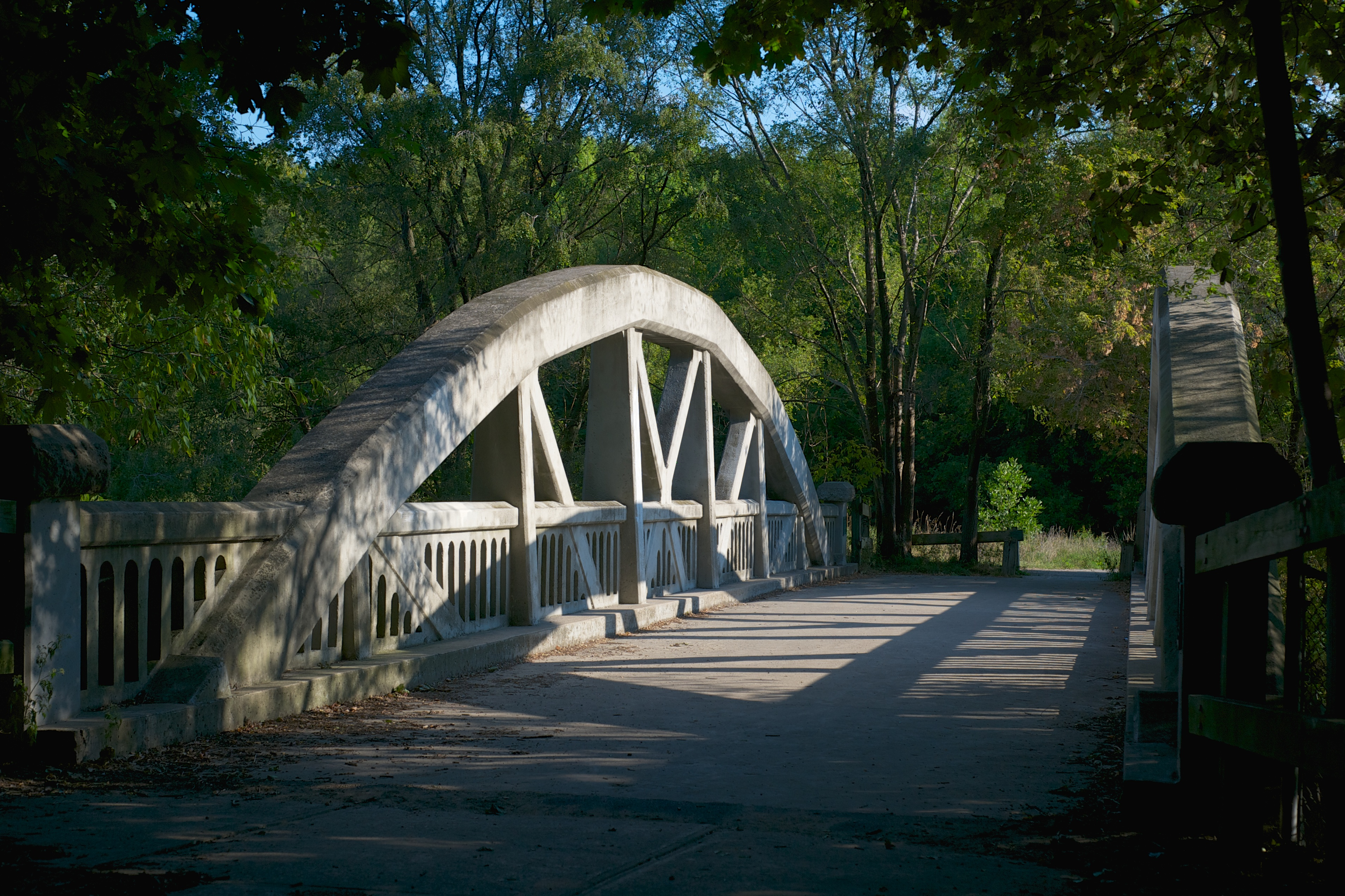
The Middle Road Bridge today. It is now used only by pedestrians and cyclists.

The Middle Road or Commissioners' Road, named so because of its location between what were then the highways (or historic streets) between Toronto and Hamilton, Dundas Street and Lakeshore Road, followed the same path taken by today's Queen Elizabeth Way (QEW), with little exception, beginning at the Humber River and travelling to Bronte Line (where today, the QEW veers south). Since the highway followed a concession road, it was straight for almost its entire length, veering only at Browns Line (Highway 27), the Credit River, and at the Oakville border. At the time of construction, this route was surrounded by farmland, as most of the towns in the area at the time lay along Dundas or Lake Shore, to the north and south respectively. However, the highway spurred rapid development of the surrounding land. Middle Road was also a concession created between 1st Concession South and 2nd Concession South during the early 1800s.

Most of the route was paved with concrete. The two roadways were separated by a median varying in width, (Note: Shragge indicates three to ten feet on page 79, consistent with the minimum of one metre given by Stamp on page 20, but far less than the maximum of nine metres.) often filled with trees. Most of the rows of trees along the old country lane were incorporated into the median, and new ones were planted in the gaps, as equal focus was given to functionality as aesthetics. Over most of the bridges, the two roadways converged, undivided. These were, however, a great improvement from the original bridges, as seen in the picture at top left. At Highway 10 (Hurontario Street) was Canada's first cloverleaf interchange, opened in 1937. (Note: Stamp also writes on page 20 that construction on the cloverleaf began in 1937. Shragge also indicates it opened in 1937 on page 81.)

One of the elements of the Middle Road, to which engineers paid particular attention in future highway design, was controlled access. While the section between the Humber River and Highway 27 was built without allowance for private driveways, and was thus controlled-access, many at-grade intersections existed along the Middle Road west of Highway 27, and many adjoining landowners built driveways to the highway for access, an issue that led to legislation to allow the designation of a road as 'controlled-access'.

Today, a small remnant of the pre-1930s Middle Road can be found spanning the Etobicoke Creek at the Mississauga and Etobicoke border. A bowstring bridge, constructed in 1909, carried the Middle Road until 1932 and served as a farm lane until the section of the Queen Elizabeth Way into Toronto opened in 1940. It was the first concrete truss bridge built in Canada. It was designed by Frank Barber and built by Octavius Hicks. The short section is today named Sherway Drive.

== History ==
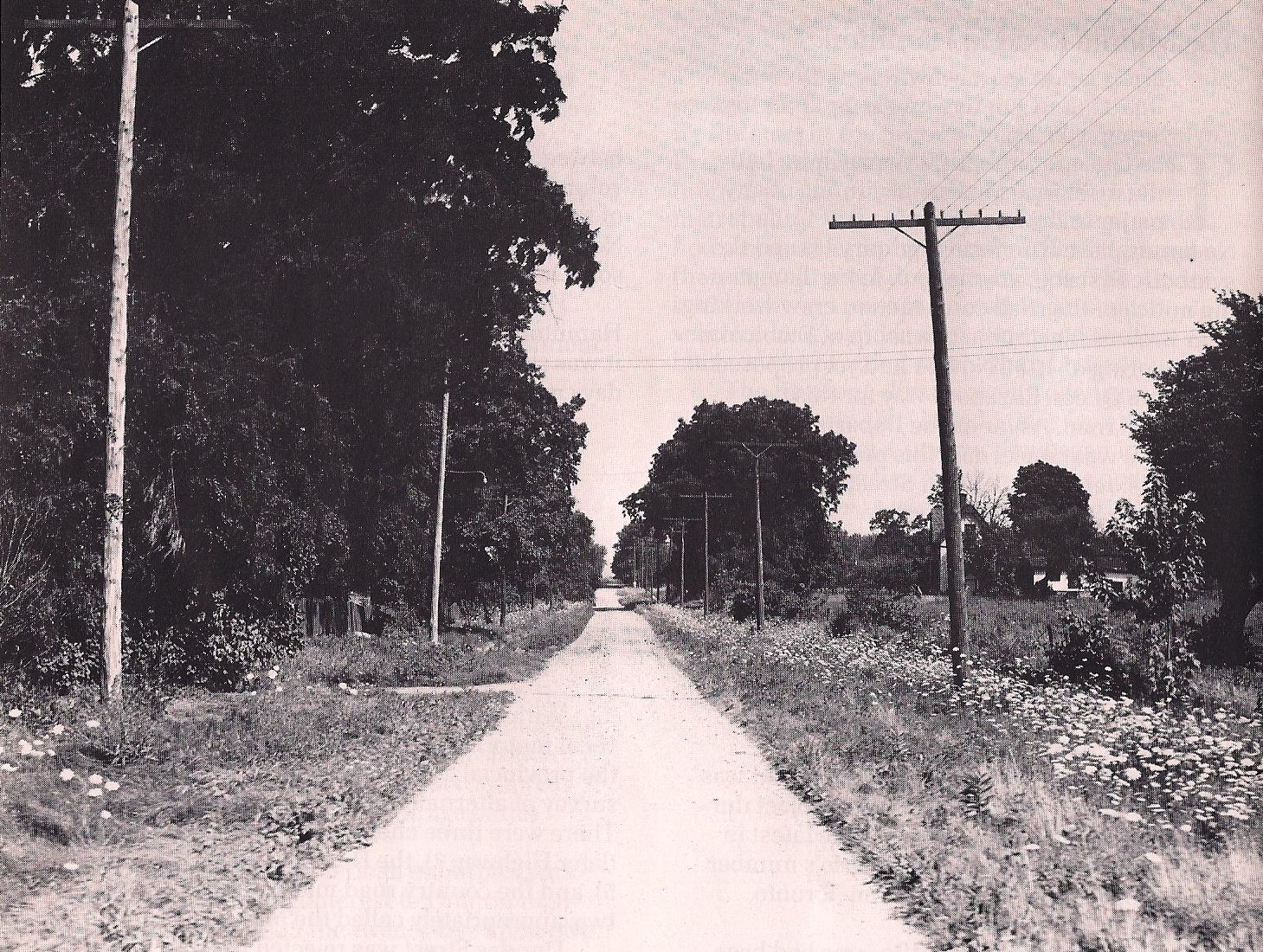
Middle Road in 1917.

In colonial times, both Lakeshore Road and Dundas Street existed. In Toronto Township (modern Mississauga) the dirt path between concessions one and two was referred to as "the middle road" in 1852. Later in the 19th century Toronto Township council began to ask Etobicoke Township about connecting Middle Road with a road in Etobicoke between the 2nd and 3rd concessions. There were right of way difficulties as the two roads met the Etobicoke Creek in different places. These discussions continued sporadically in the late 19th century with York County Council receiving proposals from Peel County Council. Finally in 1909, the Middle Road was carried over the Etobicoke River to connect to a road today known as Evans Avenue via the aforementioned bowstring bridge.

The Middle Road was not the first highway between Toronto and Hamilton. In January 1914, a concrete road known as the Toronto–Hamilton Highway was proposed. The highway was chosen to run along the macadamized old Lake Shore Road, instead of Dundas Street to the north, because of the numerous hills encountered along Dundas, which would have increased the cost of the road without improving accessibility. The Middle Road, a dirt lane named because of its position between the two, was not considered since Lake Shore and Dundas were both overcrowded and in need of serious repairs. By November of that year, the proposal was approved, and work began quickly to construct the road known today as Lake Shore Boulevard and Lakeshore Road from Toronto to Hamilton. The road was finished by 1917, 18 feet (5.5 m) in width and nearly 40 mi (64 km) long, becoming the first concrete road in Ontario, as well as one of the longest stretches of concrete road between two cities in the world. The highway became the favourite drive of many motorists, and it quickly became a tradition for many families to drive it every Sunday.

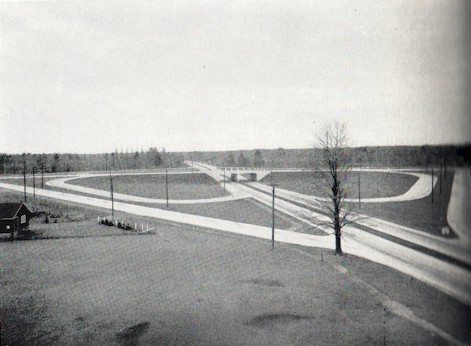
The cloverleaf interchange at Middle Road and Highway 10 was the first controlled access interchange in Canada.

Over the next decade, vehicle usage increased monumentally; as early as 1920 the Lake Shore Road was once again bumper to bumper on weekends. In response, the Department of Highways once again sought out improving another road between Toronto and Hamilton. The Middle Road was chosen to avoid delays on Dundas or Lake Shore. It was to have the connection across the Etobicoke Creek to Evans Avenue replaced with a connection to Queen Street west of the Humber River via a new bridge over the creek. The road was to be more than twice the width of the Lake Shore Road, at 40 ft (12 m), and would carry two lanes of traffic in each direction.

Construction on what was then known as the Queen Street extension (which was designated as an extension of the Middle Road east from Toronto Township) between Highway 10 and Highway 27 began in the spring of 1931, and between Highway 27 and the Humber River on November 1, 1931. This project included the bypassing of a jog in Queen west of Kipling Avenue, which is today known as North Queen Street.

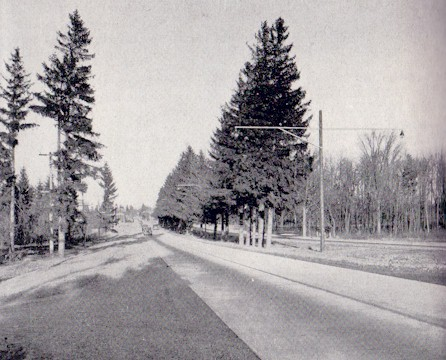
Middle Road in 1937, east of present-day Erin Mills Parkway, looking east towards Toronto.

Before the highway could be completed, the 1934 provincial elections brought Mitchell Hepburn into office as premier, and Thomas McQuesten was appointed the new minister of the Department of Highways. McQuesten, in turn, appointed Robert Melville Smith as deputy minister. Smith, inspired by the German Autobahns – new "dual-lane divided highways," separated by a depressed grass centre crossing short distances between major cities – modified the design for Ontario roads, and McQuesten ordered that the Middle Road be changed into this new form of highway. A right-of-way of 132 ft (40 m) was purchased along the Middle Road and construction began to convert the existing sections to a divided highway, as well as on Canada's first cloverleaf interchange at Highway 10.

We need this new highway to relieve traffic congestion in the metro Toronto .

— Thomas McQueston

By the end of 1937, the Middle Road was open between Toronto and Burlington, where it connected with what was first known as the Hamilton – Niagara Falls Highway. It soon came time to name the new highway, and an upcoming visit by King George VI and Queen Elizabeth proved to be the focal point for a dedication ceremony. On June 7, 1939, the two royal family members drove along the highway (which now connected to Niagara Falls) and passed through a light beam nearby the Henley Bridge in St. Catharines. This caused two Union Jacks to swing out, revealing a sign which read the Queen Elizabeth Way.

However, the ceremony designated the highway only between St. Catharines and Niagara Falls. The remainder of the road was known by various names, including the Toronto–Burlington/Hamilton Highway and the New Middle Road Highway. At the formal opening of the highway between Toronto and Niagara Falls on August 23, 1940, the entire length was declared the Queen Elizabeth Way by Thomas McQueston.

In the early 1940s, a separate route for the QEW through Etobicoke Township was constructed, bypassing the Middle Road (which later became the Queensway) to the Humber River.
