= Queen Elizabeth Way =

Controlled-access highway in Ontario

Queen Elizabeth Way
- Queen Elizabeth Way highlighted in red

Route information
- Maintained by the Ministry of Transportation of Ontario
- Length: 139.1 km (86.4 mi)
- History: Built: 1931 – October 14, 1956

Major junctions
- Fort Erie end: Peace Bridge in Fort Erie, Ontario
- Highway 420 in Niagara Falls; Highway 405 in Niagara-on-the-Lake; Highway 406 in St. Catharines; Red Hill Valley Parkway in Hamilton; Highway 403 / 407 ETR in Burlington; Highway 403 at the Mississauga–Oakville line
- Toronto end: Highway 427 / Gardiner Expressway in Toronto

Location
- Country: Canada
- Province: Ontario

Highway system
- Ontario provincial highways; Current; Former; 400-series
← Highway 427	→ Highway 502
Former provincial highways
Highway 500 →

The Queen Elizabeth Way (QEW) is a 400-series highway in the Canadian province of Ontario linking Toronto with Fort Erie in the Niagara Peninsula. The highway begins at the Canada–United States border on the Peace Bridge and travels 139.1 kilometres (86.4 mi) around the western end of Lake Ontario, ending at Highway 427 near the western border of Toronto. The freeway continues as the Gardiner Expressway into downtown Toronto. The QEW is one of Ontario's busiest highways, with an average of close to 250,000 vehicles per day on some sections.

Major highway junctions are at Highway 420 in Niagara Falls, Highway 405 in Niagara-on-the-Lake, Highway 406 in St. Catharines, the Red Hill Valley Parkway in Hamilton, Highway 403 and Highway 407 in Burlington, Highway 403 at the Oakville–Mississauga boundary, and Highway 427 in Etobicoke. Within the Regional Municipality of Halton the QEW is signed concurrently with Highway 403.

The history of the QEW dates back to 1931, when work began to widen the Middle Road in a similar fashion to the nearby Dundas Highway and Lakeshore Road as a relief project during the Great Depression. Following the 1934 provincial election, Ontario Minister of Highways Thomas McQuesten and his deputy minister Robert Melville Smith changed the design to be similar to the autobahns of Germany, dividing the opposite directions of travel and using grade-separated interchanges at major crossroads. When opened to traffic in 1937, it was the first intercity divided highway in North America and featured the longest stretch of consistent illumination in the world. While not a true freeway at the time, it was gradually upgraded, widened, and modernized beginning in the 1950s, more or less taking on its current form by 1975. Since then, various projects have continued to widen the route. In 1997, the provincial government turned over the responsibility for the section of the QEW from Highway 427 and the Humber River to the City of Toronto, which redesignated this segment as a westward extension of the Gardiner Expressway.

The speed limit is 110 km/h (68 mph) throughout most of its length, with the exceptions being between McLeod Road and Mountain Road in Niagara Falls, between Millen Road in Hamilton and the Freeman Interchange in Burlington, and east of Winston Churchill Boulevard in Mississauga, where the speed limit is 100 km/h (62 mph). The route is patrolled by Ontario Provincial Police (OPP) and maintained by the Ministry of Transportation of Ontario (MTO).

== Name and signage ==
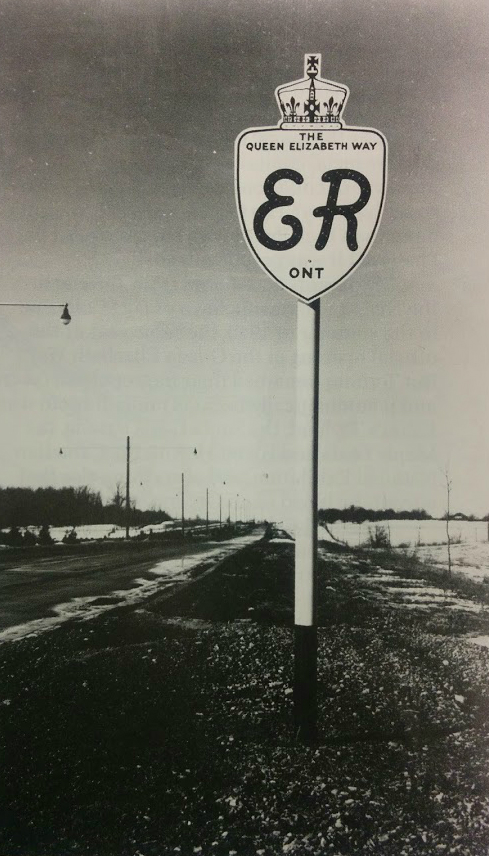
Original Queen Elizabeth Way signage, 1940

The Queen Elizabeth Way was named for the wife and royal consort of King George VI who would later become known as Queen Elizabeth the Queen Mother. It is sometimes referred to as the Queen E. In 1939, the royal couple toured Canada and the United States in part to bolster support for the United Kingdom in anticipation of war with Nazi Germany, and also to mark George VI's coronation. The highway received its name to commemorate the visit; it was unveiled on June 7 as the King and Queen ceremonially opened the highway at a site near the Henley Bridge in St. Catharines. Originally, the highway featured stylized light standards with the letters "ER", the Royal Cypher for Elizabeth Regina, the Latin equivalent to "Queen Elizabeth." While mostly replaced with modern lighting masts like other Ontario highways, replicas of these stylized "ER" poles have been installed upon three bridges along the QEW: in Mississauga over the Credit River, in Oakville over Bronte Creek, and in St. Catharines over Twelve Mile Creek. In addition Highway 420 in Niagara Falls and its extension, Falls Avenue, has these "ER" light standards installed since 2002, as a nod to this route being part of the original QEW upon its inauguration in 1940 until being bypassed by QEW's extension to Fort Erie in 1941.

The markers identifying the QEW have always used blue lettering on a yellow background instead of the black-on-white scheme other provincial highway markers use. They originally showed the highway's full name only in small letters, with the large script letters "ER" placed where the highway number is on other signs. In 1955, these were changed to the current design, with the lettering "QEW." Although the QEW has no posted highway number, it is considered to be part of the province of Ontario's 400-series highway network. The Ministry of Transportation of Ontario designates the QEW as Highway 451 for internal, administrative purposes.

A monument was originally in the highway median at the Toronto terminus of the highway west of the Humber River bridges, dedicated to the 1939 visit of King George VI and Queen Elizabeth and known as the "Lucky Lion." The column, with a crown at the top and a lion at the base, was designed by W. L. Somerville and sculptors Frances Loring and Florence Wyle for $12,000 (equivalent to $246,300 in 2025). The monument was removed in 1972 in order to accommodate widening of the original QEW, and relocated in August 1975 to the nearby Sir Casimir Gzowski Park along Lake Ontario, on the east side of the Humber River.

== Route description ==
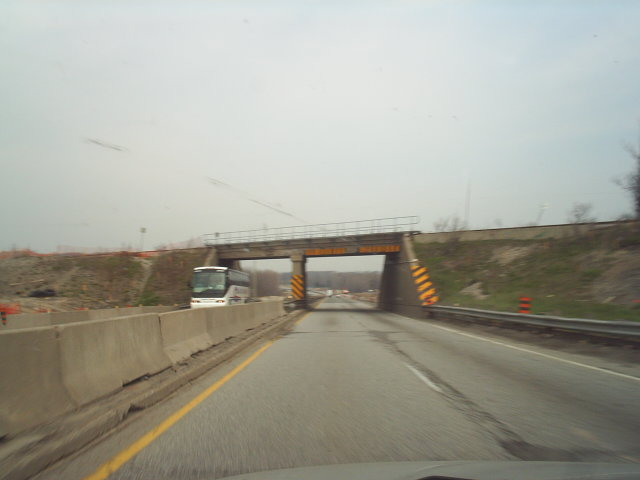

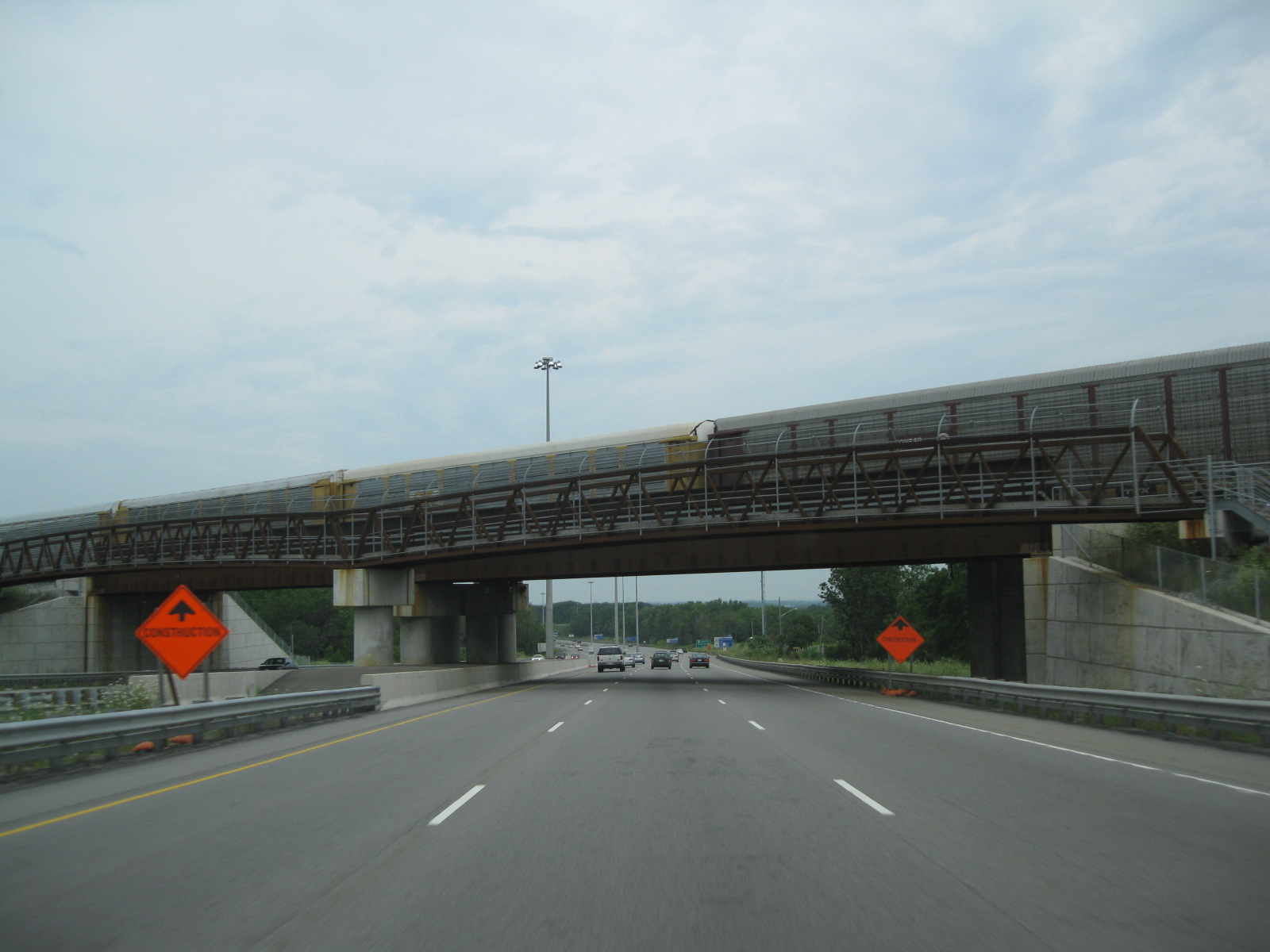
QEW just south of interchange with Highway 405 as seen in 2005 and 2009, respectively, showing the original railway overpass, and the replacement structure which is longer to accommodate the widened freeway.

The QEW is a 139-kilometre-long (86 mi) route that travels from the Peace Bridge, which connects Fort Erie with Buffalo, New York, to Toronto, the economic hub of the province. It runs as a freeway circling the western lakehead of Lake Ontario, cutting through Niagara Falls, St. Catharines, Hamilton, Burlington, Oakville, and Mississauga en route. A 22-kilometre (14 mi) portion of the freeway in Burlington is signed concurrently with Highway 403. Unlike other provincial highways in Ontario, the QEW is directionally signed using locations along the route as opposed to cardinal directions. Driving towards Toronto, the route is signed as "QEW Toronto" throughout its length. In the opposing direction, it is signed as "QEW Hamilton", "QEW Niagara", and "QEW Fort Erie" depending on the location.

=== Fort Erie–Niagara Falls ===
The Queen Elizabeth Way begins at the Canada–United States border on the three-lane undivided Peace Bridge, which connects with I-190 (via NY 955B) in Buffalo, New York. A customs booth is located just west of the bridge, beyond which a toll is charged to Canada-bound drivers. West of there, access is provided to nearby Highway 3 and the Niagara Parkway. Through customs, the four-lane freeway proper begins, immediately curving northwest. Within Fort Erie, interchanges provide access to and from the QEW at Central Avenue, Concession Road, Thompson Road, Gilmore Road, and Bowen Road. While there is some urban development at the beginning of the freeway, the majority of the first 25 kilometres (16 mi) are within lowland forests. Numerous creeks flow through these forests, often flooding them. The Willoughby Marsh Conservation Area lies southwest of the freeway, approximately ten kilometres (6.2 mi) south of Niagara Falls. After an interchange with Lyons Creek Road, the freeway turns northward.

After crossing the Welland River, the original route of the Welland Canal, the freeway exits the forests and enters agricultural land surrounding the suburbs of Niagara Falls, which the highway enters north of the McLeod Road interchange. Within the city, Highway 420 meets the QEW at a large four-level junction and widens to six lanes. The opposing carriageways split at this interchange to accommodate the left-hand exit/entry of the flyover ramps accessing Highway 420, with the Toronto-bound traffic passing under these flyovers and a CN rail crossing. Exiting the northern fringe of Niagara Falls, the freeway again curves northwest and begins to descend through the Niagara Escarpment, a World Biosphere Reserve. Highway 405 merges with the QEW along the short rural stretch between Niagara Falls and St. Catharines. While there is no Toronto-bound access to Highway 405, Niagara-bound drivers can follow this short freeway to the Lewiston–Queenston Bridge, which crosses the U.S. border into Lewiston, New York. The QEW continues west into St. Catharines.

=== St. Catharines–Hamilton ===
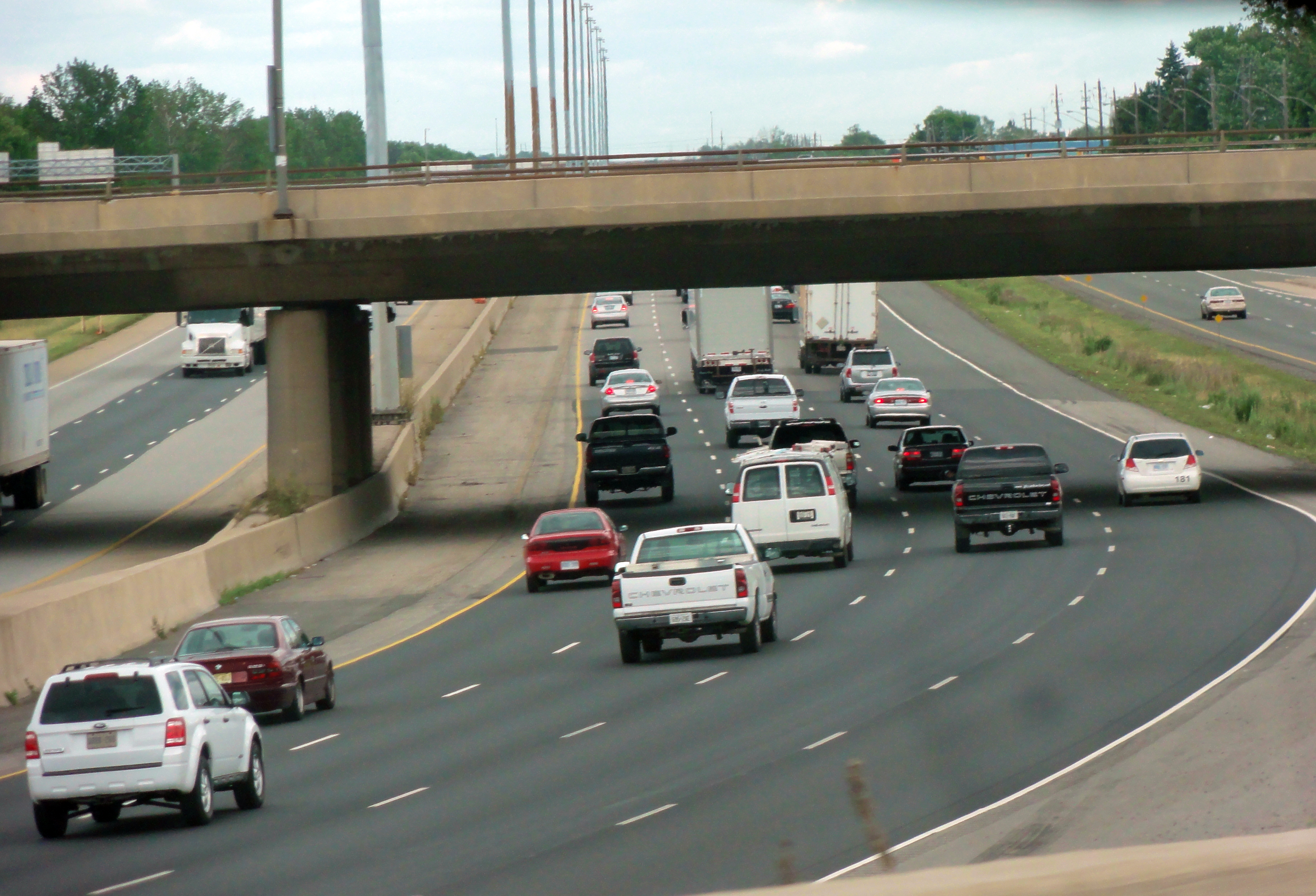
The Niagara-bound QEW at the Red Hill Valley Parkway interchange in Hamilton

As the Queen Elizabeth Way enters St. Catharines, it ascends the Garden City Skyway to cross the Welland Canal. This 2.2-kilometre (1.4 mi) structure replaced the lift bridge south of it, one of two major bottlenecks prior to the early 1960s, and is one of two high-level skyways along the route. As the QEW was the first long distance freeway in North America, several modern engineering concepts were not considered in its original 1939 design, and although it was modernized in a recent reconstruction that concluded in 2011, further expansion of the highway is inhibited by the proximity of properties throughout most of its length. Consequently, most of the route beyond the Welland Canal is wedged between service roads which provide access to and from the QEW as well as to local businesses and residences. After passing the Ontario Street (Regional Road 42) interchange, the freeway crosses Martindale Pond, which forms the mouth of Twelve Mile Creek. West of the crossing is a trumpet interchange with Highway 406, which travels south to Welland, after which the QEW crosses out of St. Catharines and into the town of Lincoln at Fifteen Mile Creek, continuing with a six-lane cross-section.

Throughout Lincoln, the QEW travels along the Lake Ontario shoreline through the Niagara Fruit Belt; numerous wineries line the south side of the freeway. Interchanges at Victoria Road (Regional Road 24) and Ontario Street (Regional Road 18) provide access to the communities of Vineland and Beamsville, respectively. The latter encroaches upon the south side of the QEW, interrupting the otherwise agricultural surroundings of the highway in Lincoln. Immediately east of the Bartlett Avenue interchange, the freeway enters Grimsby, where it becomes sandwiched between the Niagara Escarpment and Lake Ontario. The route passes under three overpasses that have remained unchanged since the highway was built: Maple Avenue, Ontario Street, and Christie Street, all served by a single diamond interchange. South of the Fifty Point Conservation Area, the freeway exits the Niagara Region and enters the city of Hamilton.

Within Hamilton, the highway passes almost entirely within an industrial park, with interchanges at Fifty Road, Fruitland Road, and Centennial Parkway (formerly Highway 20). The third of these is intertwined with the Red Hill Valley Parkway interchange (completed in 2009), at which point the freeway widens to eight lanes. From here, the freeway curves northwest onto Burlington Beach and begins to ascend the Burlington Bay James N. Allan Skyway, the second high-level bridge along the route. As it crosses over the entrance to Hamilton Harbour, the freeway enters the Regional Municipality of Halton and descends into the city of Burlington.

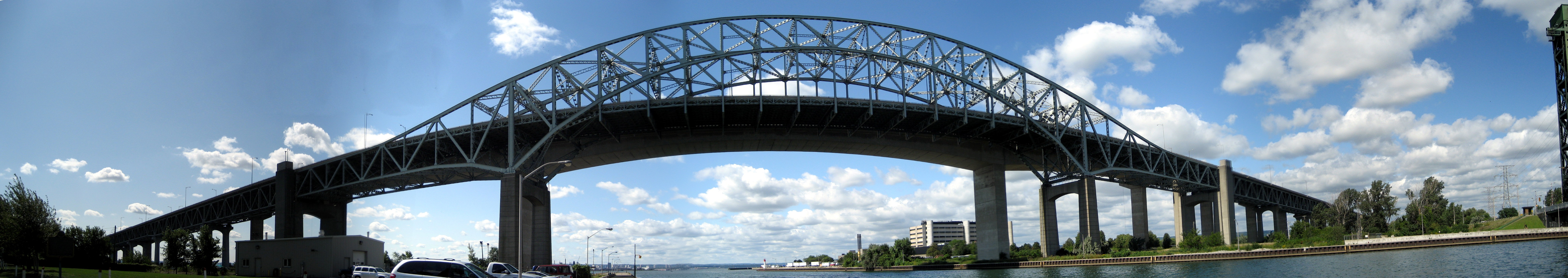
Panoramic view of Burlington Bay James N. Allan Skyway, near Beach Boulevard

=== Burlington–Oakville ===
After descending into Burlington, the QEW crosses North Shore Boulevard (former Highway 2) and Fairview Street/Plains Road as it passes by Mapleview Centre. Next to the Burlington Transmission Station, the QEW encounters the Freeman Interchange, originally opened in 1958 to allow construction of Highway 403 and reconfigured in the early 1990s to accommodate the western terminus of Highway 407. The freeway turns to the east, adding the concurrency with Highway 403 through Burlington and Oakville, as it travels straight though a commercial office area. Service roads reappear through this stretch to serve businesses fronting the highway. The segment, which was expanded in 2011, is eight lanes wide, including one high-occupancy vehicle lane (HOV lanes) in each direction, which required the construction of a second structure over Sixteen Mile Creek. In the eastern end of Oakville, the route curves northeast after a partial interchange with Royal Windsor Drive, passing the Ford Motor Assembly Plant. Shortly after an interchange with Ford Drive (Halton Regional Road 13), Highway 403 diverges north from the QEW, with the semi-directional ramp to Highway 403 passing under both directions of the QEW. The QEW turns back to the east, entering Mississauga and the Peel Region at Winston Churchill Boulevard.

=== Mississauga–Toronto ===
The Queen Elizabeth Way in Mississauga, looking west, at the Evans Avenue interchange and bridges over Etobicoke Creek.

Within Mississauga, the freeway encounters its narrowest right-of-way, wedged between residential subdivisions on either side that prevent further expansion from its six-lane cross section. Between the interchanges with Winston Churchill Boulevard and Mississauga Road, the freeway is not illuminated. It crosses the Credit River valley, where a second bridge will soon be under construction. The segment east of the Credit River is being examined for expansion possibilities, but like the previous section, there is little room for more lanes without property acquisition. Some of the interchanges through Mississauga have ramp meters on the entrances onto the QEW, meaning only one vehicle is allowed to enter the on-ramp per each green light on a traffic signal, depending on the time of day, or the amount of traffic is on the highway at a certain time. After crossing Etobicoke Creek, which forms the boundary between Peel Region and Toronto, QEW passes through a sprawling, four-level interchange with Highway 427 which marks its eastern terminus, as the freeway continues eastward to downtown Toronto as the municipal Gardiner Expressway.

The QEW formerly continued beyond the Highway 427 interchange to the Old Toronto city limits at the Humber River, although this section between was downloaded from provincial to municipal authorities on April 1, 1997, and became a westward extension of the Gardiner Expressway. Provincial control of the freeway ends shortly after an onramp from Highway 427; municipal ownership is evident from the use of different high-mast illumination poles that are shaded to reduce light pollution at the underpasses with Wickman Road and a railway line. East of that point the freeway retains its provincial-installed conventional lighting as it splits into a short collector-express system about ten lanes wide to serve the interchanges with Kipling Avenue and Islington Avenue. East of Grand Avenue, the municipality's shaded high-mast lighting has been erected as the freeway crosses Parklawn Avenue and a CN rail line followed by offramps to Lake Shore Boulevard, then it curves as it passes the residential condominium towers of The Queensway – Humber Bay neighbourhood along the waterfront, the Mr. Christie cookie factory (which later became a part of Mondelēz International) and the Ontario Food Terminal on the north side, and then a tunnel leading to the Humber Loop streecar right-of-way.

As the freeway crosses the west bank of the Humber River this marks the QEW's old eastern terminus and the beginning of the Metro Toronto-constructed portion of the Gardiner. Coincidentally at the former eastern end of the QEW, the Metro-built Gardiner Expressway also assumed the provincial Highway 2 designation from Lake Shore Boulevard (from Lake Shore Boulevard's on-ramp to the Gardiner), until most of Highway 2 was decommissioned in 1998 leaving both Lake Shore and the Gardiner without a provincial route number. This old demarcation line was quite visible on the freeway as a change in pavement quality and the use of different guardrail and lighting (since the late 1960s the province used conventional truss poles originally fitted with mercury halide lamps before being replaced by high-pressure sodium lamps in the 1990s, while Metro installed had the distinctive cobra-neck 30-foot (9.1 m) poles with fluorescent tubes that were since swapped for orange low-pressure sodium lamps in 1978). The Gardiner Expressway continues through downtown Toronto, and after crossing the Don River, it ends at Lake Shore Boulevard (where it ceded the Highway 2 provincial routing back to Lake Shore until 1998), although a partial interchange connects to the Don Valley Parkway (DVP) which turns ninety degrees and heads northbound when it eventually meets Highway 401 and continues as Highway 404.

== History ==
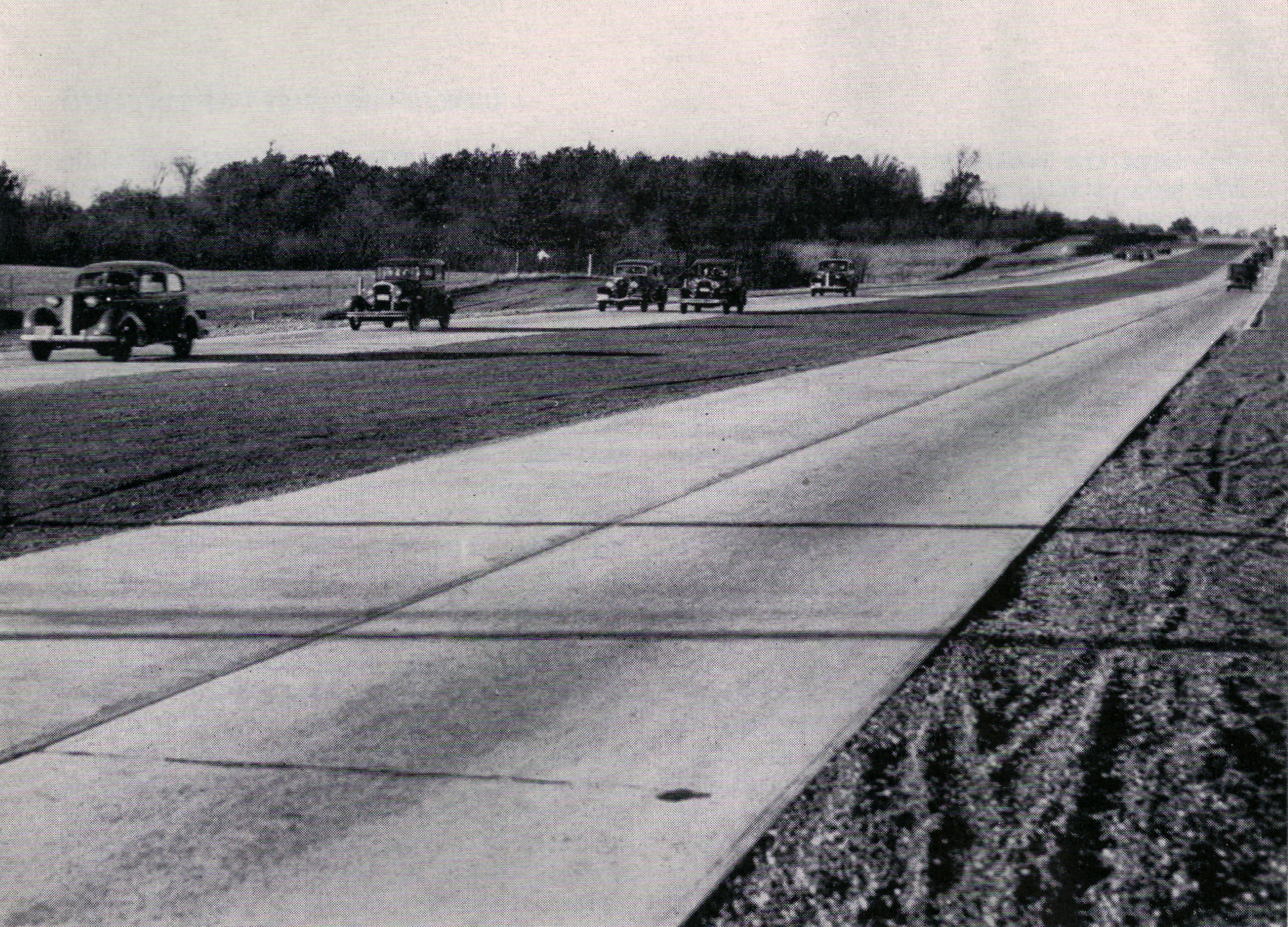
The QEW opened as The Middle Road in the mid-1930s, lacking most modern safety standards

=== Toronto-Hamilton Highway ===
As automobile use in southern Ontario grew in the early 20th century, road design and construction advanced significantly. A major issue faced by planners was the improvement of the routes connecting Toronto and Hamilton, which were consistently overburdened by the growing traffic levels. Following frequent erosion of the former macadamized Lakeshore Road, a cement road known as the Toronto–Hamilton Highway was proposed in January 1914. The highway was designed to run along the lake shore, instead of Dundas Street to the north, because the numerous hills encountered along Dundas would have increased costs without improving accessibility. Middle Road, a dirt lane named because of its position between the two, was not considered since Lakeshore and Dundas were both overcrowded and in need of serious repairs. Construction began on November 8, 1914, but dragged on throughout the ongoing war. It was formally opened on November 24, 1917, 5.5 m (18 ft) wide and nearly 64 km (40 mi) long. It was the first concrete road in Ontario, as well as one of the longest stretches of concrete road between two cities in the world. Though many minor improvements in alignment were made, the original highway was without modern bridges for the crossings of the Credit River and Bronte, Etobicoke, and Mimico Creeks. Modern concrete arch bridges for all crossings except Bronte Creek were completed in 1919.

=== The Middle Road ===
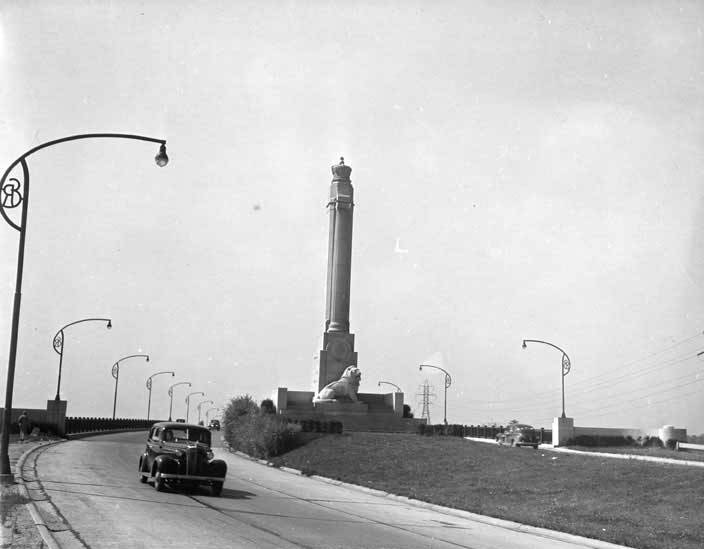
The Toronto entrance to the QEW and the Queen Elizabeth Way Monument in 1940. In 1974, the monument was removed to accommodate widening of the QEW. The monument was reinstalled nearby in 1975.

Over the next decade, vehicle usage increased substantially, and by 1920 Lakeshore Road was again highly congested on weekends. In response, the Department of Highways examined improving another road between Toronto and Hamilton. The road was to be more than twice the width of Lakeshore Road at 12 metres (39 ft) and would carry two lanes of traffic in either direction. Construction on what was then known as the Queen Street Extension in Etobicoke Township west of today's Kipling Avenue (bypassing a northern jog in Queen Street) to connect with the eastern end of The Middle Road across the Etobicoke Creek began in early 1931 as a Great Depression relief project.

Before the highway could be completed, Thomas McQuesten was appointed the new minister of the Department of Highways, with Robert Melville Smith as deputy minister, following the 1934 provincial elections. Smith, inspired by the German autobahns—new "dual-lane divided highways"—modified the design for Ontario roads, and McQuesten ordered that the Middle Road be converted into this new form of highway. A 40-metre (130 ft) right-of-way was purchased along the Middle Road and construction began to convert the existing sections to a divided highway. Work also began on Canada's first interchange at Highway 10 (Hurontario Street).

By the end of 1937, the Middle Road was open between Toronto and Burlington. When it opened, it was the first intercity divided highway in North America (Note: While the Long Island Parkway and several similar roadways opened in the late twenties and early thirties, these parkways were designed to move traffic in and out of a city's downtown. The Middle Road was designed to provide travel between cities, and opened a year before the Pennsylvania Turnpike, the first U.S. highway to do this.) and boasted the longest continuous stretch of illumination in the world until the Second World War.

=== The New Niagara Falls Highway and a new freeway approaching Toronto ===
McQuesten also foresaw the financial opportunities that came with cross-border tourism and opening the "Ontario frontier" to Americans. In 1937, construction began on a new dual highway from Hamilton to Niagara Falls (first known as the Hamilton-Niagara Falls Highway) along the bottom of the Niagara Escarpment. This route was intended to connect with the Middle Road on the opposing shore of Lake Ontario. Work began at the end of March to grade the route between Stoney Creek and Jordan. The Hamilton-Niagara Falls Highway connected to the Middle Road via a trumpet junction known as the Burlington Interchange.

The prospect of removing hundreds of acres of farmland did not sit well with many, especially farmers in the path of the new highway. Rumours spread the prices paid for land were to be well below market value, and local protests erupted throughout the summer. However, the purpose of the new highway was to replace the congested, winding and hilly route of Highway 8 along the escarpment; several groups of collisions that summer gradually persuaded the public to support the new highway. By the autumn, 340 acres (140 hectares) of fruitland were cleared to make way for the route.

Over the next two years, numerous bridges and cloverleaf interchanges along the new highway were constructed. In addition, a large traffic circle was built in Stoney Creek to connect with Highway 20. The majority of this structural work was completed by June 1939. However, despite being opened to traffic between Stoney Creek and Jordan, the majority of the new route was gravelled. Over a ten-week period in the late spring and early summer of 1940, 58 km (36 mi) were paved, completing the four-lane highway between Hamilton and Niagara Falls.

That year, a new grade-separated route for the highway through Etobicoke, (west of Toronto) bypassing the former Middle Road alignment (which later became The Queensway) opened to the highway's terminus at Lake Shore Boulevard.

It soon came time to name the new highway the "Queen Elizabeth Way", and an upcoming visit by King George VI and Queen Elizabeth proved to be the focal point for a dedication ceremony. On June 7, 1939, the two royal family members drove along both the newly connected Toronto-Hamilton and Hamilton-Niagara Falls highways and passed through a light beam near the Henley Bridge in St. Catharines. This caused two Union Jacks to swing out, revealing a sign which read The Queen Elizabeth Way.

However, the ceremony only named the segment of the highway between St. Catharines and Niagara Falls as The Queen Elizabeth Way. The remainder of the road was still known by various names, including the Toronto–Burlington/Hamilton Highway and The New Middle Road Highway. On August 23, 1940, McQuesten cut a ribbon at the Henley Bridge in St. Catharines and officially declared the Queen Elizabeth Way open between Toronto and Niagara Falls, at which point the entire route was given the Queen Elizabeth Way name. Over a ten-week period in the late spring and early summer of 1940, 58 km (36 mi) were paved, completing the four-lane highway between Hamilton and Niagara Falls.

Construction on an extension towards Fort Erie, which became known as the QEW Extension, was underway, but the ongoing war delayed its completion. As an interim measure, the unpaved highway was opened during the summer of 1941. Bypassed by the new QEW extension to Fort Erie in 1941, the Niagara Falls bridge approach became a spur route that was no longer part of the QEW so it was officially named the Rainbow Bridge Approach for the next three decades (until upgraded and designated as Highway 420 in 1972). Two lanes of pavement were laid in 1946, but the four-lane highway was not fully paved until 1956, with the portion from Niagara Falls to Fort Erie being the last to be fully paved. The entire route – from Toronto's Humber River all the way to Fort Erie, all named as the QEW – was officially opened on October 14 of that year, completing the envisioned highway 25 years after work had begun.

=== Obsolescence and subsequent reconstruction ===
Long traffic jams, such as this one entering Toronto prior to the construction of the Gardiner Expressway, became commonplace on the unupgraded highway.

==== 1950s-1970s: New alignment, replacement of at-grade intersections and drawbridges ====
Despite some modern infrastructure, including traffic circles, interchanges, and some grade-separations, the majority of the new superhighway was not controlled-access. This meant exiting farmers and homeowners along several segments that were once concession roads were permitted to build driveways onto the road. In addition, the majority of the crossroads encountered along the route were at-grade intersections. This, combined with the ever-increasing number of automobiles, traffic jams, accidents, and deteriorating pavement, led the Department of Highways to state it had begun "salvaging" the QEW in its 1953 annual report.

The first new interchange opened at Dixie Road in 1953, beginning a seven-year program to make the Hamilton–Toronto section into a full-fledged freeway. Over the next three years, the route was improved west to Highway 10 (Hurontario Street). This work was completed in early 1956. Service roads were installed and 13 intersections eliminated, resulting in a 50% reduction of the accident rate along that section. In Toronto, work began in 1955 to construct the Gardiner Expressway, which would tie in with the end of the QEW. The first section of the Gardiner, connecting the QEW to Jameson Avenue, was officially opened by Metropolitan Toronto chairman Fred Gardiner and Premier Leslie Frost on August 8, 1958. Work was also underway on the Toronto Bypass, involving the upgrade of Highway 27 to a freeway between the QEW and the new Highway 401. Construction began in 1953, and included a reconstruction of the cloverleaf interchange with the QEW with larger loop ramps. This interchange would become one of the worst bottlenecks in the province only a decade after its completion, according to Highways Minister Charles MacNaughton.

Expanding the QEW to six lanes between Hamilton and Toronto required the expansion of several large bridges, such as this one at Bronte Creek in 1959. The former Service Road interchange west of Bronte Creek is under construction in the background.

On September 11, 1957, construction began to widen the QEW to six lanes between Highway 27 and the Humber River. It was completed by December 1958, as were interchanges with Mississauga Road and Kerr Street. Service roads allowed engineers to separate local access from the highway and avoid space-consuming interchanges in many places. Therefore, interchanges were only opened at Bronte Road (then Highway 25), Kerr Street, Royal Windsor Drive (then Highway 122), Southdown Road (now Erin Mills Parkway north of the interchange), Mississauga Road, Hurontario Street (then still Highway 10), Cawthra Road, Dixie Road, and Highway 27.

Two major projects were ongoing near Burlington at this point. On April 29, 1952, the W.E. Fitzgerald struck the two-lane lift bridge at the entrance to Hamilton Harbour. Damage to the crossing resulted in the QEW's closure until a temporary bridge was erected. To remedy what was becoming a major delay and hazard, the Department of Highways began planning a high-level bridge to cross the shipping channel. Immediately west of the Guelph Line interchange, construction also began to improve access to the new bridge with the Freeman Diversion, a new routing of the QEW that would bypass the existing Middle Road section which passed through the community of Freeman that was becoming increasingly built-up, then connect to a new three-way junction (the Freeman Interchange) with the proposed Chedoke Expressway, and continue to the existing Burlington Interchange which would retain the underpass for Middle Road but be reconfigured to accept traffic primarily from the Diversion. Work on the new bridge and Diversion proceeded over the next six years.

The Garden City Skyway in September 1963, soon before opening. The old bridge lies to the left, raised for a passing ship. Traffic is queued on both sides, a frequent occurrence each summer until the skyway was built.

The Freeman Diversion opened to traffic in August 1958, with the old alignment becoming an eastward extension of Plains Road (still directly accessible via a split west of Guelph Line). Premier Frost opened the 2,700-metre-long (8,900-foot) four-lane skyway two months later on October 30. Although the skyway greatly reduced traffic delays, it was not without controversy due to its height, cost, tolling, and most especially its name. Residents in Burlington demanded it be named the Burlington Skyway, while Hamilton residents countered with the Hamilton Skyway. As a compromise, the Thomas B. McQuesten Skyway was proposed. However, the provincial government had the final say in the matter, and opted to name it the Burlington Bay Skyway. Tolls were collected beginning on November 10.

Elsewhere, in St. Catharines, planning was already advanced on a second skyway to cross the Welland Canal. The Homer Lift Bridge, a longstanding feature along Highway 8, was another point where the QEW narrowed to two lanes and traffic faced regular delays. Construction began in July 1960 and progressed over the following three years. Tentatively known as the Homer Skyway, the name that was almost unanimously chosen by St. Catharines residents would be Garden City Skyway. . The $20 million (in $1963, 204,000,000 adjusted for inflation) structure was officially opened by Premier John Robarts on November 15, 1963. However, traffic had already been flowing on the 2,200-metre-long (7,200 ft) bridge since October 18. As with the Burlington Bay Skyway, tolls were collected on the Garden City Skyway. The collection of tolls on both skyways continued until December 28, 1973.

The Shook's Hill interchange serving Erin Mills Parkway, in June 1961. This rotary junction was the only example built in Ontario. It was reconfigured to a conventional parclo A4 in 2001.

On September 15, 1960, the Shook's Hill interchange, a rotary junction or grade-separated traffic circle (the only example in Ontario, although this interchange type is common in the United Kingdom), was completed at what is now Erin Mills Parkway. It was opened to traffic the following day, and completed the program to make the QEW a freeway between Burlington and Toronto.

A project to reconstruct the intersection with Brant Street into an interchange was completed 1964 and made the QEW a freeway between Hamilton and Toronto.

By 1963, work was underway to improve the Niagara Falls–Hamilton stretch of the QEW into a controlled-access highway. At the end of 1966, the QEW was six lanes wide through Mississauga and Toronto, as well as between the Freeman Interchange and east of Brant Street. This six-laning was extended west from Ninth Line to Kerr Street by 1968. The remaining section of four-lane highway along the Burlington to Toronto stretch, between Brant Street and Kerr Street, was reconstructed beginning in 1970 and completed by 1972.

The late 1960s and early 1970s also saw the complete reconstruction of three important interchanges: the Rainbow Bridge Approach (later Highway 420) in Niagara Falls, Highway 20 (Centennial Parkway) in Hamilton, and Highway 27 in Toronto. The former two were traffic circles in place since the QEW was opened in 1940; the third was a large cloverleaf interchange that had become outdated with the expansion of Highway 27 to twelve lanes throughout the 1960s. The connections with the Rainbow Bridge Approach and with Highway 27 required new massive high-speed interchanges to accommodate freeway-to-freeway traffic movements.

The reconstruction of the interchange between QEW and Highway 27 (later renumbered to Highway 427) from a cloverleaf to a semi-directional T took just one year in the late 1960s. Note the temporary diversion of QEW traffic to an overpass that would eventually be used for The Queensway.

The four-level junction with Highway 27 (which would be renumbered as Highway 427 on December 4, 1971) was built over 48.5 hectares (120 acres) and required the construction of 19 bridges and the equivalent of 42 km (26 mi) of two-lane roadway. Construction began in September 1968, although preliminary work had been ongoing since 1966; the interchange opened to traffic on November 14, 1969. Between the recently expanded Highway 27 and Lake Shore Boulevard, the QEW was also expanded to 8–10 lanes which included a short collector-express system between Kipling Avenue and Royal York Road.

Construction of the four-level interchange between the QEW and Rainbow Bridge Approach began in 1971, removing the two traffic circles along the approach at the QEW and Dorchester Road. The interchange between the QEW and Lundy's Lane (Highway 20) was also removed; instead, the new interchange provided access to Montrose Road. The work was completed by April 1972, at which point the Rainbow Bridge Approach was designated as Highway 420.

Planning for the removal of the Stoney Creek traffic circle was completed by 1970, and reconstruction began in 1974. This involved the removal of a rail line which crossed through the circle, and was the demise of one of two major features along the route. The new interchange opened in 1978, completing the transformation of the QEW into a controlled-access highway.

During the late 1970s, construction was carried out on several new interchanges between Hamilton and Toronto. New interchanges at Dorval Drive and Trafalgar Road replaced the one at Kerr Street. In Mississauga, work commenced at Cawthra Road, while in Burlington a new interchange was built at Appleby Line.

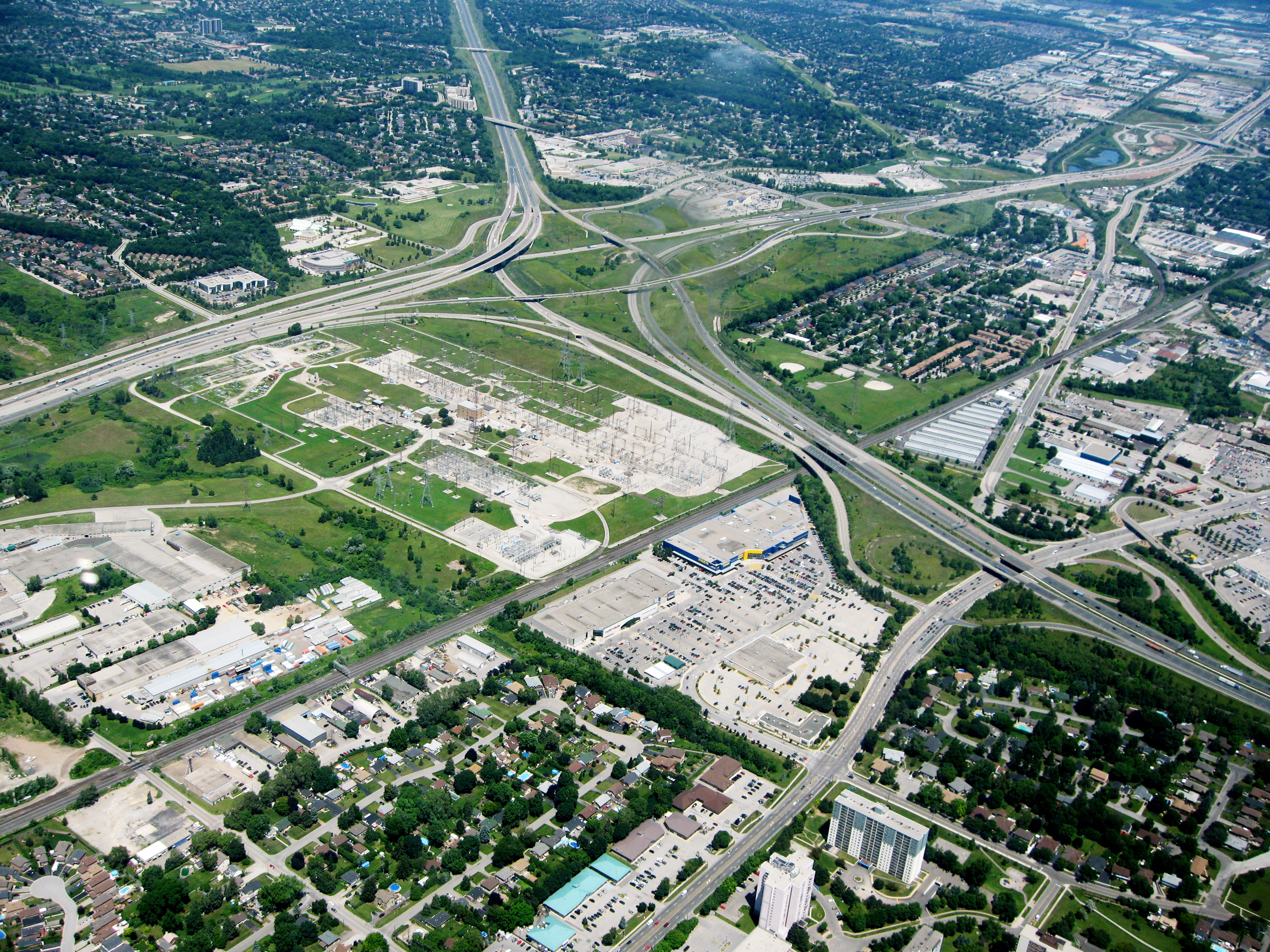
The Freeman Interchange in Burlington. Note the loop ramp from Fairview Street to Niagara-bound QEW that was closed off in 2001 and reinstated in the late 2000s.

==== 1980s to 1997: Growing capacity ====
Now functioning as a freeway, the QEW was already overburdened by the ever-increasing number of vehicles. The Burlington Bay Skyway, which was built to bypass Hamilton Harbour and the Port of Hamilton, was the lone four-lane link on the route between Hamilton and Toronto. It was initially designed to handle 50,000 vehicles daily, but by 1973 there were 60,000 vehicles crossing it. Preliminary work on a second parallel structure began a decade later in 1983. In July of that year, Transportation Minister James Snow broke ground for the new bridge. Construction was carried out over two years, and the twinned structure was opened on October 11, 1985. It was named the James N. Allan Skyway, in honour of James Allan, Minister of Highways during construction of the original skyway. The new name was not well received by locals, and debate erupted once again whilst the original bridge was closed and repaired for several years. It reopened on August 22, 1988, with Toronto-bound traffic crossing the original bridge. The twin structure was renamed the Burlington Bay James N. Allan Skyway, though it is commonly referred to as simply the Burlington Skyway.

Alongside the twinning of the skyway to eight lanes, the QEW was widened to at least six lanes from the Freeman Interchange to Centennial Parkway. A variable lighting system, changeable message signs and traffic cameras were added to create a new traffic-management system called COMPASS. Modern interchanges were constructed for Fairview Street/Plains Road (steel tub girder bridges replaced the 1937-built structure originally used for the Burlington Interchange) and Northshore Boulevard (then Highway 2) including a collector lane for Niagara-bound traffic and on/off-ramps to Eastport Drive. Eastport Drive was built at the same time to relieve traffic on Beach Boulevard. This work was completed between late 1984 and 1990.

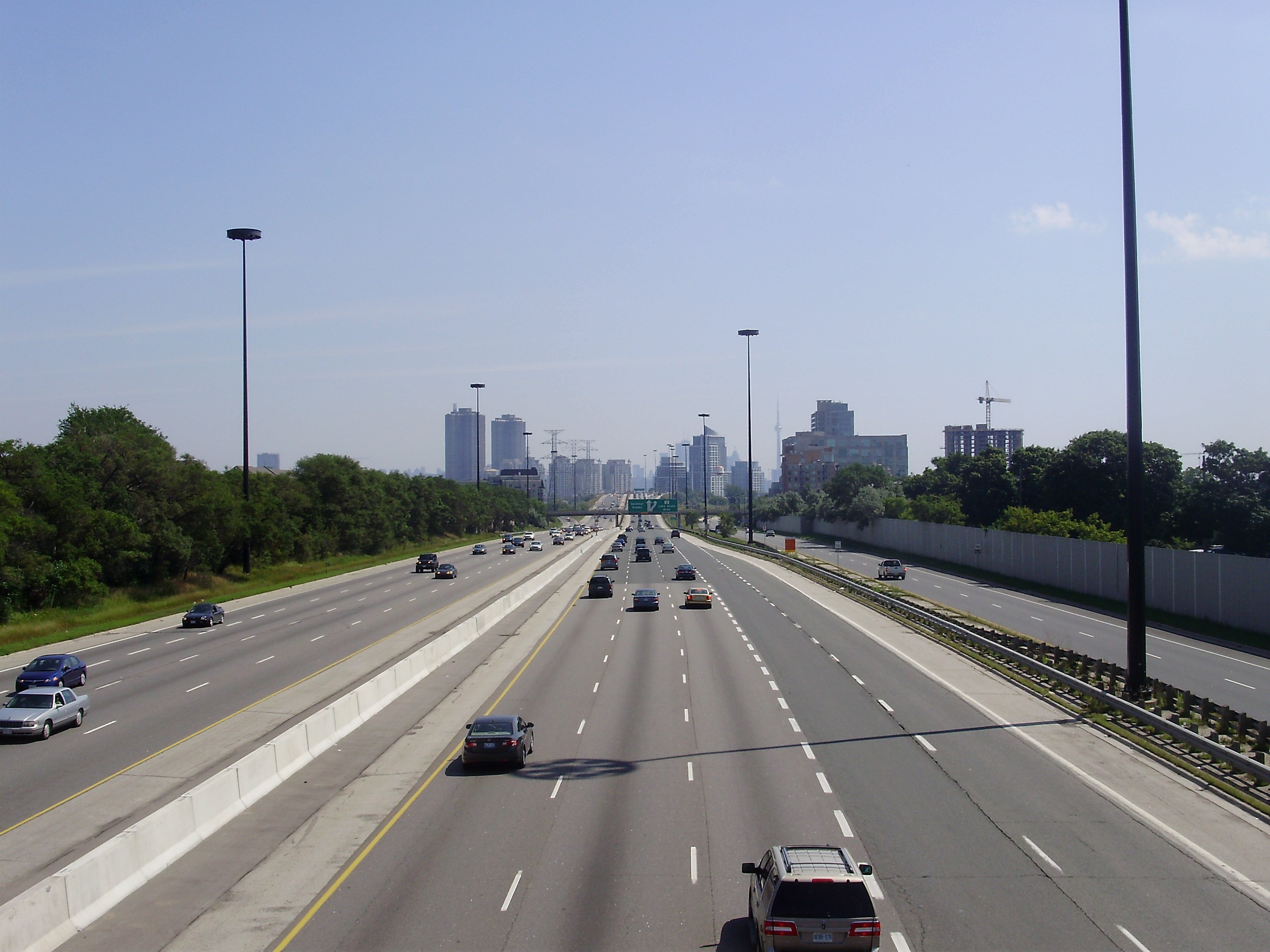
The former QEW in Etobicoke which was re-designated as part of the Gardiner Expressway in 1997, looking east from Royal York Road overpass.

With the expanded capacity of the Burlington Skyway, and the unanticipated traffic volumes on Highway 403, the Freeman Interchange was now faced with a capacity problem. To resolve this, the renamed Ministry of Transportation began planning for the missing link of Highway 403 between Burlington and Mississauga that would run parallel to the QEW; this right-of-way would be sold to the 407 ETR consortium in 1995 and built as part of that route.

Work began in August 1991 to reconfigure the directional-T interchange to modern standards, which included realigning the QEW carriageways as mainline traffic, and adding a fourth leg for the future Burlington-Mississauga link. Due to land and cost constraints of the reconstruction, this necessitated replacing the directional ramp with a lower-capacity loop ramp for the movement from Toronto-bound QEW to the Brantford-bound Highway 403 (as some traffic was expected to be diverted away from the Burlington Skyway to the under-construction Lincoln M. Alexander Parkway and planned Red Creek Expressway). The rebuilt Freeman Interchange was partially opened on October 23, 1993, to serve the existing QEW and Highway 403 segments; the first sod for what would open as Highway 407 was turned that day. The completed ramps (the first to be built were cast-in-place post-tensioned bridges to cross Highway 403 westbound, followed in 2000 by precast girder bridges to pass over the North Service Road) connecting to the future Burlington-Mississauga freeway sat unused until that segment finally opened on July 30, 2001, as part of Highway 407 ETR.

Budgetary restraints in the 1990s forced the provincial government to sell off or download many highways to lower levels of government, or, in the case of Highway 407, to a private consortium. As part of recommendations, the QEW east of Highway 427 to the Humber River was transferred to the responsibility of Metro Toronto. The transfer took place on April 1, 1997. The city subsequently designated that segment as a westward extension of the Gardiner Expressway. After the provincial downloading and Amalgamation of Toronto, this stretch of former QEW has remained largely unchanged though some segments have received a mix of high mast and low masts with shaded high pressure sodium lamps (similar to the Don Valley Parkway), while the old steel guardrail in the median was replaced by an Ontario "tall-wall" concrete barrier in 2007. Worn-out bilingual provincial signage have received unilingual replacements, while billboards which the province had long prohibited have been erected in proximity of the now-municipal freeway. At the partial interchange with Kipling Avenue, the offramp from the westbound collectors initially only led to Kipling Avenue northbound, but in 2005 the City of Toronto modified it to a signalized junction that would also provide access to Kipling Avenue southbound too.

=== Since 1998 ===
The Shook's Hill rotary interchange (originally opened in 1960) with Erin Mills Parkway and Southdown Road, was completely reconstructed to a conventional parclo A4 from May 1999 to 2001. The nearby Hurontario Street interchange, originally a cloverleaf junction, was reconfigured to a five-ramp parclo by 2010.

In 2001–2002, modifications were made to the interchange with Highway 427. This included a new loop ramp from the Highway 427 southbound collector lanes to the eastbound Gardiner Expressway (formerly Toronto-bound QEW), aimed at relieving the congestion in the express lanes created by the southbound collector-to-express transfer near Bloor Street, as the southbound collectors originally lacked direct access to the Toronto-bound QEW (downloaded from the province in 1998 to become the part of the Gardiner). This new ramp to the eastbound Gardiner required a realignment and underpass tunnel of the existing off-ramp from the westbound Gardiner (formerly the Hamilton-bound QEW) to Browns Line. The westbound Gardiner Expressway (formerly the Hamilton-bound QEW) received an off-ramp to Sherway Gardens, which necessitated an underpass to be implemented in the directional ramp from the Highway 427 southbound express to the Hamilton-bound QEW. At the intersection of the northbound access road from Sherway Gardens to The Queensway, a new on-ramp to the Highway 427 southbound collectors was added, enabling access to either Browns Line or the eastbound Gardiner Expressway (using the new loop ramp).

The Red Hill Valley Parkway, which opened on November 16, 2007, added a significant new interchange to the QEW. The ramp to the southbound parkway did not open until December 2008. The nearby interchange to Burlington Street had its 1958-built overpass replaced to accommodate the widening of the QEW to eight lanes, which included a collector lane on the Niagara-bound QEW to avoid weaving that otherwise would have resulted from the close proximity to the Red Hill Valley Parkway junction. Construction was completed in 2009.

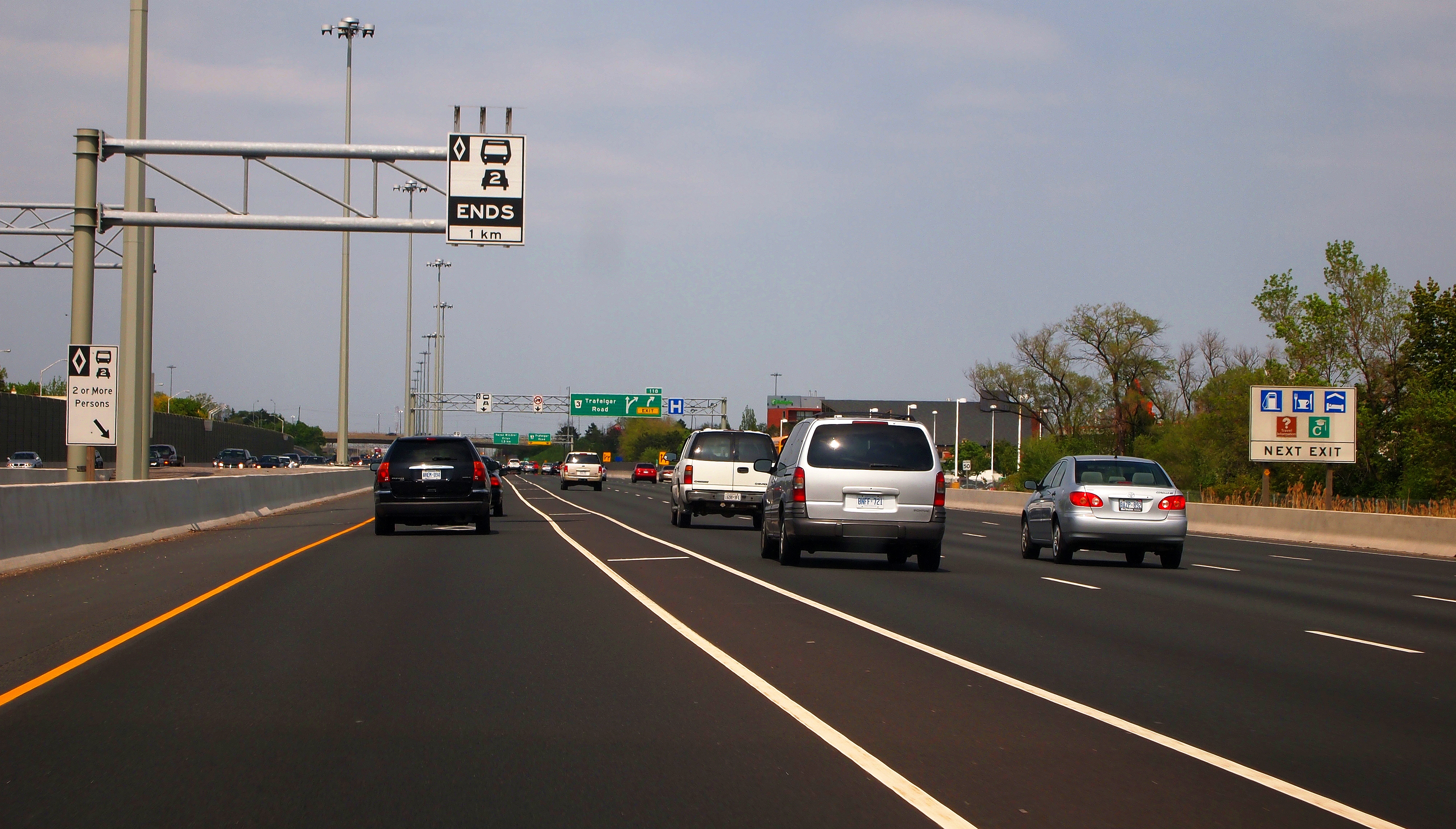
HOV lanes along the co-signed QEW / Highway 403.

From 1998 to 2003, the QEW between Brant Street and Guelph Line was expanded from four to eight lanes, necessitating the removal of the underused Freeman Diversion split including the Niagara-bound carriageway's left-hand exit to Plains Road, so the Toronto-bound carriageway could be shifted next to the Niagara-bound carriageway where the opposing directions would be separated by a concrete median barrier and high mast lighting. This complemented the replacement of the existing railway grade separation (where each carriageway had its own underpass in order to accommodate the Plains Road off-ramp) with a new single structure wide enough to accommodate both directions of the expanded freeway. Access from the QEW to Plains Road had become redundant since the nearby Brant Street interchange had opened in 1991, so Plains Road was redirected to the existing service road (Queensway Drive/Harvester Road) that meets Guelph Line at an intersection just south of Guelph Line's interchange with the QEW. The interchange with Guelph Line (originally a full cloverleaf when built, with the northern half modified to a diamond in the mid-1960s) was reconfigured to modern Parlo A4 that exclusively served QEW traffic after the ramps to Plains Road were removed, which was completed in 2006.

Starting in 2007, the highway was widened to permit an additional HOV lane in either direction between Guelph Line and Trafalgar Road, which involved twinning the Bronte Creek and Sixteen Mile Creek Bridges following by rehabilitating the original structures. These lanes were opened to traffic on November 29, 2010.

Work began in 2005 to widen the QEW from four to six lanes through St. Catharines from Highway 406 to the Garden City Skyway. This segment whose original design dated back to 1939, saw several interchanges improved and numerous structures replaced, although the widened Henley Bridge kept its classic architecture while existing service roads and local properties beside the freeway were largely retained. Work was completed on August 26, 2011, at a cost of $186 million.

In the late 2000s, for the section of the QEW between the Freeman Interchange and North Shore Boulevard, an additional lane was added for Niagara-bound traffic, while the widening of the Fairview Street/Plains Road underpass for the Niagara-bound QEW enabled the loop ramp from Fairview Street to be reinstated; this onramp was originally opened in 1985 and closed off in 2001 when Highway 407 ETR opened after concerns from the city over cyclists' safety.

QEW at the Highway 403 split in Oakville prior to reconstruction that commenced in 2016; the Ford Assembly Plant is in the background.

In Oakville, improvements were made to the Highway 403/QEW/Ford Drive interchange. Since 2017, traffic using the existing loop ramp in the NE corner to access Highway 403/QEW was directed onto a new overpass instead of sharing the existing overpass with westbound Highway 403 traffic. From November 2016 to 2020, the 1970s-era bridges carrying QEW traffic across Ford Drive and the eastbound ramp to Highway 403 were demolished and replaced by new wider structures which can accommodate future HOV lanes and high-mast lighting. At the present, Highway 403 only connects to the QEW west of the interchange, but a new set of flyover ramps are being proposed from Highway 403 to the QEW east of that junction using the existing right-of-way which would allow for a direct freeway connection from southern Mississauga to Milton (via Highway 407 to Highway 401).

There are also plans to twin the bridge spanning the Credit River in Mississauga. A second bridge will be built alongside the existing structure, which will then be repaired while traffic is shifted to the new bridge. In November 2019, the Ford government announced that the historic bridge would be demolished and replaced, but changed course due to public opposition on December 18 by restricting project bids to those that would rehabilitate the structure.

Construction of Ontario's first diverging diamond interchange, at Glendale Avenue, began in January 2021. The new interchange, which includes a dedicated ramp to Airport Road, opened to traffic on September 26, 2022.

== Future ==
A stretch of the QEW from east of Cawthra Road to the west of Etobicoke Creek is to be widened with the removal of the adjacent service roads, with the centerpiece of the project involving reconfiguring the Dixie Road interchange to a five-ramp parclo and replacing the aging Dixie Road overpass. Construction commenced in May 2022 with an anticipated completion date in July 2026.

In November 2023, the municipal and provincial governments announced a tentative deal which will see responsibility for the Gardiner Expressway and Don Valley Parkway transferred to the provincial government, with the two highways to be maintained as provincial highways. For the foreseeable future, the downloaded QEW segment east of Highway 427 will remain signed as part of the Gardiner.

On December 7, 2015, Ontario's Transportation Ministry announced it was working on a plan to create permanent high-occupancy toll lanes (HOT) on a 16.5-kilometre (10.3 mi) stretch, in both ways, between Trafalgar Road in Oakville and Guelph Line in Burlington starting on September 15, 2016. This would require vehicles with a single occupant to purchase a permit for such use. (A portion of Highway 427 would also have HOT lanes.) Vehicles classified as environmentally-friendly and denoted with a green license plate would not be required to pay when using the HOT lanes. Prices for the permits had not yet been determined for this plan, described as a pilot project, said Transportation Minister Steven Del Duca during a press conference.

As part of the future widening of the QEW to accommodate HOV lanes, the existing cast-in-place concrete bridges for the North Shore Boulevard underpasses were replaced with precast box girder structures on either side in 2021.

== Exit list ==
The following table lists the exits along the QEW. Exits are numbered from Fort Erie to Toronto. The following table lists the major junctions along Queen Elizabeth Way, as noted by the Ministry of Transportation of Ontario.

Division	Location	km	mi	Exit	Destinations	Notes
Niagara River; Canada–United States border		0.0	0.0	—	To I-190 – Buffalo	Fort Erie terminus; access via NY 955B
Niagara River; Canada–United States border		0.0	0.0	Peace Bridge (toll)		
Niagara	Fort Erie	0.0	0.0	Peace Bridge Border Crossing		
Niagara	Fort Erie	0.2	0.12	—	Regional Road 124 (Central Avenue) / Duty Free Way	Last Fort Erie-bound exit before U.S.A.; no exit number; no access from Central Avenue to Peace Bridge; Duty Free Way not signed Toronto-bound
Niagara	Fort Erie	1.1	0.68	1	Concession Road	Toronto-bound exit and Fort Erie-bound entrance; access via Bertie Street; formerly Regional Road 126
Niagara	Fort Erie	2.1	1.3	2	Regional Road 122 (Thompson Road) to Highway 3 / Bertie Street	Toronto-bound to Regional Road 122 south (Thompson Road) exit; Regional Road 122 north (Thompson Road) to Fort Erie-bound entrance
Niagara	Fort Erie	4.6	2.9	5	Regional Road 19 (Gilmore Road)	
Niagara	Fort Erie	6.7	4.2	7	Regional Road 21 (Bowen Road) – Stevensville	
Niagara	Fort Erie–Niagara Falls boundary	12.2	7.6	12	Regional Road 25 (Netherby Road) – Stevensville, Welland	
Niagara	Niagara Falls	15.5	9.6	16	Regional Road 116 (Sodom Road) – Chippawa, Stevensville, Crystal Beach	
Niagara	Niagara Falls	22.1	13.7	21	Regional Road 47 (Lyons Creek Road) – Welland	
Niagara	Niagara Falls	26.6	16.5	27	Regional Road 49 (McLeod Road)	
Niagara	Niagara Falls	29.5	18.3	30	Highway 420 – The Falls, Niagara Falls U.S.A. Regional Road 20 (Lundy's Lane) / Dorchester Road	Signed as exits 30A (Highway 420) and 30B (Lundy's Lane) Fort Erie-bound; Lundy's Lane formerly Highway 20; Dorchester Road formerly Regional Road 104; to Niagara Health – Niagara Falls Site
Niagara	Niagara Falls	31.5	19.6	32	Regional Road 57 (Thorold Stone Road) – Thorold	
Niagara	Niagara Falls	34.0	21.1	34	Regional Road 101 (Mountain Road)	
Niagara	Niagara-on-the-Lake	36.5	22.7	37	Highway 405 east – Queenston, Lewiston U.S.A.	Fort Erie-bound exit and Toronto-bound entrance; to I-190
Niagara	Niagara-on-the-Lake	37.8	23.5	38	Regional Road 89 (Glendale Avenue) – Niagara-on-the-Lake	Ontario's first diverging diamond interchange (DDI); to Regional Road 55 (formerly Highway 55) and Regional Road 81 (formerly Highway 8)
Welland Canal		39.7– 41.8	24.7– 26.0	Garden City Skyway		
Niagara	St. Catharines	43.9	27.3	44	Regional Road 48 (Niagara Street) / Service Road	
Niagara	St. Catharines	45.6	28.3	46	Regional Road 44 (Lake Street)	
Niagara	St. Catharines	46.9	29.1	47	Regional Road 42 (Ontario Street)	
Niagara	St. Catharines	47.4	29.5	Henley Bridge over Twelve Mile Creek		
Niagara	St. Catharines	47.7	29.6	48	Regional Road 38 (Martindale Road)	Toronto-bound exit; Fort Erie-bound entrance via Regional Road 40
Niagara	St. Catharines	48.4	30.1	49	Highway 406 south – Thorold, Welland, Port Colborne	To Niagara Health – St. Catharines Site
Niagara	St. Catharines	48.4	30.1	49	Regional Road 39 (3rd Street / North Service Road)	Toronto-bound exit; Fort Erie-bound entrance via Regional Road 40
Niagara	St. Catharines	50.4	31.3	51	Regional Road 34 (Seventh Street)	
Niagara	Lincoln	54.7	34.0	55	Regional Road 26 (Jordan Road) – Jordan Station	
Niagara	Lincoln	57.6	35.8	57	Regional Road 24 (Victoria Avenue) – Vineland	
Niagara	Lincoln	64.3	40.0	64	Regional Road 18 (Ontario Street) – Beamsville	
Niagara	Grimsby	68.1	42.3	68	Regional Road 14 (Bartlett Avenue)	To West Lincoln Memorial Hospital
Niagara	Grimsby	70.6	43.9	71	Regional Road 12 (Christie Street) / Maple Avenue / Ontario Street	
Niagara	Grimsby	74.2	46.1	74	Regional Road 10 (Casablanca Boulevard)	
Hamilton		77.8	48.3	78	Fifty Road	Formerly Regional Road 450
Hamilton		82.9	51.5	83	Fruitland Road	Formerly Regional Road 455
Hamilton		88.1– 88.6	54.7– 55.1	88	City Road 20 south (Centennial Parkway)	Formerly Highway 20 south
Hamilton		88.1– 88.6	54.7– 55.1	89	Red Hill Valley Parkway	To John C. Munro Hamilton International Airport
Hamilton		89.8	55.8	90	Nikola Tesla Boulevard, Woodward Avenue	Woodward Avenue not signed Toronto-bound
Hamilton		93.8	58.3	93	Eastport Drive (Highway 7189 north)	Toronto-bound exit and Fort Erie-bound entrance
Burlington Bay		93.8– 96.0	58.3– 59.7	Burlington Bay James N. Allan Skyway		
Halton	Burlington	97.1	60.3	97	North Shore Boulevard, Eastport Drive	Formerly Highway 2; to Joseph Brant Hospital
Halton	Burlington	99.5	61.8	99	Plains Road, Fairview Street	Toronto-bound exit and Fort Erie-bound entrance; eastbound exit and westbound entrance from Highway 403; westbound exit and eastbound entrance from 407 ETR
Halton	Burlington	100.5	62.4	100	Highway 403 west – Hamilton (Downtown), Brantford	Beginning of Highway 403 concurrency; to John C. Munro Hamilton International Airport
Halton	Burlington	100.5	62.4	100	407 ETR east	Toronto-bound exit and Fort Erie-bound entrance; toll highway
Halton	Burlington	101.3	62.9	101	Regional Road 18 (Brant Street)	No Toronto-bound exit and Fort Erie-bound entrance; eastbound exit and westbound access to Highway 403 west
Halton	Burlington	103.2	64.1	102	Regional Road 1 (Guelph Line)	
Halton	Burlington	105.2	65.4	105	Walkers Line	
Halton	Burlington	107.3	66.7	107	Regional Road 20 (Appleby Line)	
Halton	Burlington–Oakville boundary	109.3	67.9	109	Regional Road 21 (Burloak Drive)	
Halton	Oakville	110.9	68.9	110	Service Road	Fort Erie-bound exit only. Access removed in 2008 to accommodate widening of the QEW for HOV Lanes
Halton	Oakville	111.3	69.2	111	Regional Road 25 (Bronte Road) – Milton	
Halton	Oakville	113.4	70.5	113	Third Line	To Oakville Trafalgar Memorial Hospital
Halton	Oakville	116.5	72.4	116	Regional Road 17 (Dorval Drive)	
Halton	Oakville	116.5	72.4	116	Kerr Street	Fort Erie-bound exit only
Halton	Oakville	118.6	73.7	118	Regional Road 3 (Trafalgar Road)	
Halton	Oakville	120.0	74.6	119	Royal Windsor Drive	Toronto-bound exit and Fort Erie-bound entrance; formerly Highway 122. Overpass has unused eastbound span since planned connection from North Service Road never materialized.
Halton	Oakville	123.1	76.5	123	Regional Road 13 (Ford Drive)	
Halton	Oakville	123.1	76.5	123	Via Highway 401 via Highway 403 east – Toronto	End of Highway 403 concurrency; Toronto-bound exit and Fort Erie-bound entrance
Halton–Peel boundary	Oakville–Mississauga boundary	124.5	77.4	124	Peel Regional Road 19 (Winston Churchill Boulevard)	Unsigned concurrency with Halton Regional Road 19
Peel	Mississauga	126.6	78.7	126	Regional Road 1 (Erin Mills Parkway) / Southdown Road	Southdown Road was formerly Highway 122
Peel	Mississauga	130.7	81.2	130	Mississauga Road	
Peel	Mississauga	132.7	82.5	132	Hurontario Street	Formerly Highway 10
Peel	Mississauga	134.9	83.8	134	Regional Road 17 (Cawthra Road)	
Peel	Mississauga	136.7	84.9	136	Regional Road 4 (Dixie Road)	Fort Erie-bound exit and Toronto-bound entrance
Toronto		138.5	86.1	138	Evans Avenue, West Mall, Brown's Line	Toronto-bound exit and Fort Erie-bound entrance
Toronto		139.1	86.4	139	Queen Elizabeth Way ends Gardiner Expressway begins Highway 427 north to Highway 401 – Pearson Airport	Toronto terminus; freeway and exit numbers continue as the Gardiner Expressway
Toronto		139.1	86.4	139	Brown's Line, Sherway Gardens Road	Toronto-bound entrance and Fort Erie-bound exit (westbound exit and eastbound entrance from Gardiner Expressway)
Toronto		141.0	87.6	141	Kipling Avenue	Fort Erie-bound exit originally only to Kipling Avenue North until municipality changed it to signalized junction in 2005 allowing access to both directions; Toronto-bound exit to Kipling Avenue via Evans Avenue
Toronto		142.1	88.3	142	Islington Avenue	Signed as exits 142A (south) and 142B (north); no Fort Erie-bound entrance from northbound Islington Avenue; Fort Erie-bound exit to southbound Islington Avenue via St. Lawrence Avenue
Toronto		144.3	89.7	144	Park Lawn Road	Toronto-bound exit and Fort Erie-bound entrance
Toronto		144.9	90.0	145	Lake Shore Boulevard Gardiner Expressway east – Downtown Toronto	Fort Erie-bound exit and Toronto-bound entrance; formerly Highway 2 west; former Queen Elizabeth Way Toronto terminus; Gardiner Expressway (former Highway 2 east) continues
1.000 mi = 1.609 km; 1.000 km = 0.621 mi: Closed/former; Concurrency terminus; Incomplete access; Tolled; Route transition

== In popular culture ==
As the principal travel route between Toronto and Buffalo, whenever sports teams from the two cities face each other (particularly the Sabres and Maple Leafs in the National Hockey League) the game is called The Battle of the QEW. This name has also been used to describe CFL games between longtime arch-rivals the Toronto Argonauts and Hamilton Tiger-Cats.

== See also ==
- Monarchy in Ontario
- Royal eponyms in Canada
