= Julian Smith (footballer) =

Bahamian footballer

Julian Gardiner Smith
Personal information
- Date of birth: 25 August 1967 (age 59)
- Place of birth: , Bahamas
- Position: Defender

Senior career*
Years	Team	Apps	(Gls)
- Dynamos

International career^{‡}
2000–2006	Bahamas	6	(0)
- * Club domestic league appearances and goals ‡ National team caps and goals as of 15 April 2016

Julian Gardiner Smith (born 25 August 1967) is a Bahamian soccer defender.

== International career ==
He made his international debut for Bahamas in a March 2000 FIFA World Cup qualification match against Anguilla and has earned a total of 6 caps, scoring no goals. He has represented his country in 5 FIFA World Cup qualification matches.

He also plays for the national beach soccer team.
