= Garden City Skyway =

Highway bridge across the Welland Canal in Ontario, Canada

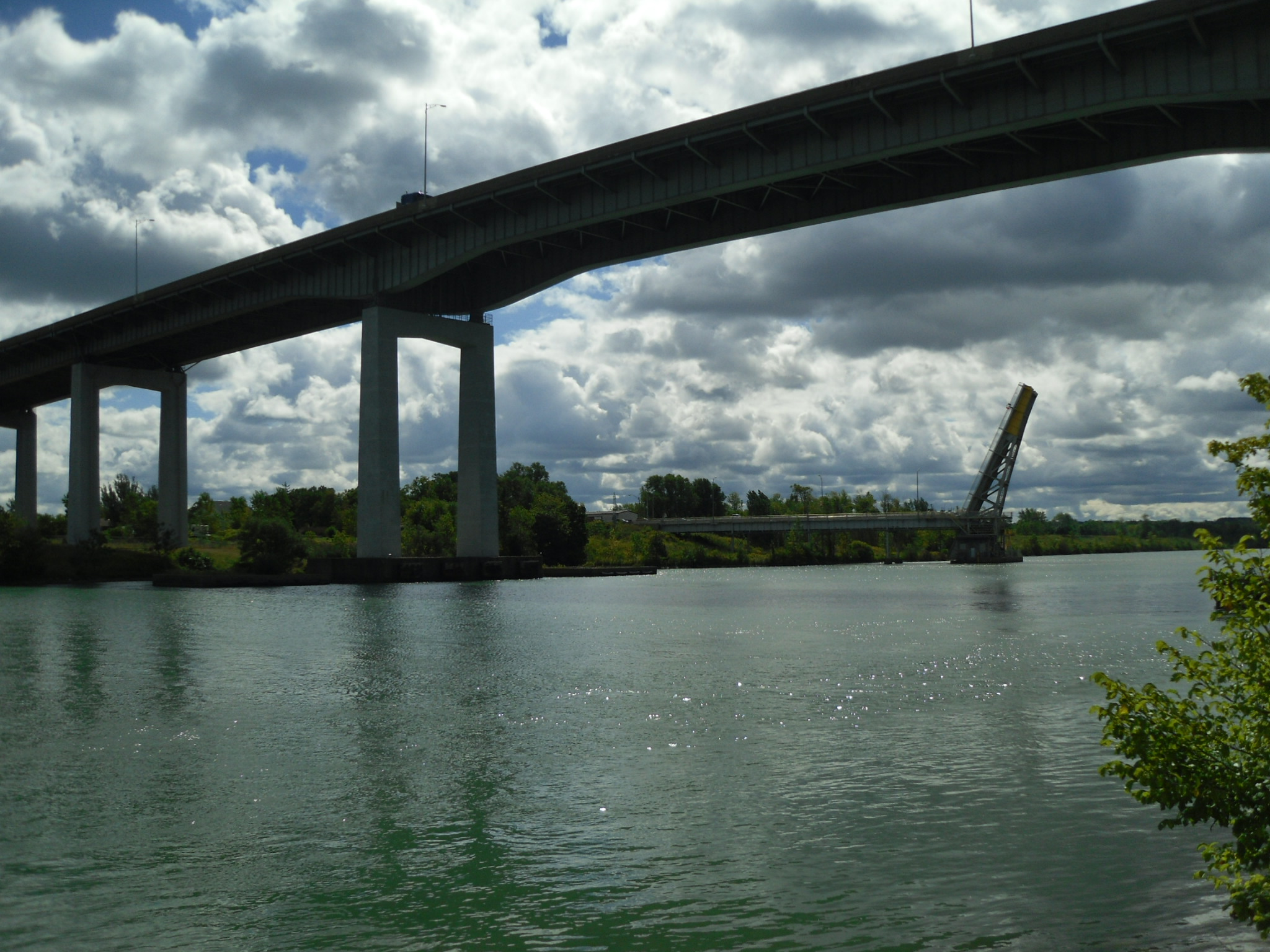
- Coordinates: 43.16731°N 79.19520°W
- Carries: 6 lanes of Queen Elizabeth Way
- Crosses: Welland Canal
- Locale: St. Catharines, Ontario
- Official name: Garden City Skyway
- Other name(s): Bridge 4A, "The Skyway"
- Maintained by: Ontario Ministry of Transportation

Characteristics
- Design: Steel
- Total length: 2.2 kilometres (1.4 mi)
- Width: 30 metres (98 ft)

History
- Opened: October 18, 1963

Statistics
- Daily traffic: 169,100 (2016)
- Toll: 1963-1973

Location
- Interactive map of Garden City Skyway

The Garden City Skyway is a major high-level bridge located in St. Catharines and Niagara-on-the-Lake, Ontario, Canada, that allows the Queen Elizabeth Way (QEW) to cross the Welland Canal without the interruption of a lift bridge. Six lanes of traffic are carried across the bridge, which is 2.2 kilometres (1.4 mi) in length and 40 metres (130 ft) at its tallest point.

It is the tallest and largest single structure along the entire QEW, since the Burlington Bay James N. Allan Skyway (which is also part of the QEW) consists of two separate and smaller four-lane bridges. Among all the bridges spanning the present Welland Canal, the Skyway is numbered Bridge 4A (the Homer Lift Bridge is Bridge 4). When the Garden City Skyway is closed due to a traffic accident or weather conditions, traffic is diverted to cross the canal at the Homer Lift Bridge.

As of 2025, planning is underway to twin the existing Skyway to increase traffic capacity of the QEW.

== History ==
The Garden City Skyway in September 1963, soon before opening. The old bridge lay to the left, raised for a passing ship. Traffic is queued on both sides, a frequent occurrence each summer until the skyway was built.

Construction began in January 1960, with the main span crossing the Welland Canal hoisted into place in July of that same year. The bridge was open to traffic on October 18, 1963. During construction, the bridge was referred to as the Homer Skyway, taking its name from the lift bridge that the new skyway was to replace. Upon dedication, the bridge was officially named the Garden City Skyway, using the nickname of St. Catharines, "Canada's Garden City." Tolls were charged on the bridge until 1973.

In the 1980s, the bridge received a Jersey barrier in the median which incorporated conventional truss light poles. In the 1990s, upgrades to the bridge included an Ontario "tall-wall" concrete median barrier, and new bridge parapets/guardrails with light poles on the outside.

In 2015, the high-pressure sodium lights on the bridge were replaced with bright white LED lights on the existing truss poles.

== Diversion ==
When the Garden City Skyway is closed due to a traffic accident or weather conditions, traffic is diverted along frontage roads (Dieppe Road, Dunkirk Road, Glendale Avenue, Queenston Road, Taylor Road and York Road) to cross the canal at the Homer Lift Bridge, re-connecting to the QEW on the opposite side.

== Proposed expansion ==
Since the early 2010s, the Ontario Ministry of Transportation (MTO) has been working on plans to build an additional bridge next to the Skyway, twinning it. Reasons for twinning the bridge include high traffic demand, road safety (the existing bridge lacks shoulders on both sides) and structural concerns as a result of the age of the existing bridge.

The second bridge would be around 2.2 kilometres (1.4 mi) in length, and be constructed north of the existing Skyway for Toronto-bound traffic, while the existing bridge would be used by vehicles heading toward Niagara. Once open, the existing Skyway bridge would be refurbished and rehabilitated.

As of May 2022, construction is estimated to start in 2026 and take around 4 years to complete. The preferred route was announced in 2013. 25 properties were purchased by the Ministry of Transportation to facilitate the planned twinning.

== See also ==
- Burlington Bay James N. Allan Skyway
- Burgoyne Bridge
- Queen Elizabeth Way
- Welland Canal
- List of bridges in Canada
- List of longest bridges
