= Julian Cleveland Smith =

Canadian engineer

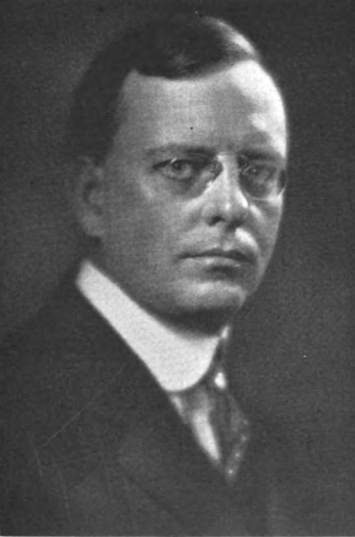
- Born: October 7, 1878; Elmira, New York
- Died: June 24, 1939 (aged 60); Westmount, Quebec
- Citizenship: Canadian (American by birth)
- Education: Cornell University
- Organization(s): Shawinigan Water & Power Company, Montreal Tramways Company
- Spouse: Bertha Louise Alexander
- Children: 2 sons, 2 daughters

Julian Cleveland Smith (October 7, 1878 – June 24, 1939) was a Canadian engineer and business executive originally from the United States. He was associated for many years with the Shawinigan Water and Power Company, of which he was president from 1933 to 1939, and with the Montreal Tramways Company. He was a key figure in the hydroelectric development of the Saint-Maurice River in central Quebec.

== Biography ==
Born in Elmira, New York, in the southwest of the State of New York, in October 1878, he moved with his family to Buffalo, where he attended elementary and high school together with his twin brother Joslyn. He enrolled at Cornell University in Ithaca, New York. Although his twin brother died in January 1897, Smith continued his studies and received his degree in mechanical engineering, with electrical option in 1900. The 1900 Cornell yearbook describes him as a discreet and studious young man who had military ambitions before he chose to put his energies into his electrical engineering program.

After he graduated, he worked as an industrial designer for a manufacturing company and for the Pan-American Exposition which took place in Buffalo in 1901. He later joined the engineering firm of Wallace C. Johnson, in Niagara Falls, as a draftsman.

In September 1902, Johnson and Smith arrived in Shawinigan Falls to help with the construction of the hydroelectric facilities of the Shawinigan Water and Power Company. The company offered Smith a job as superintendent and he moved to Montreal. Smith rose through the ranks and became general superintendent in 1906, chief engineer in 1909, vice president in 1915 and vice president and general manager the next year. He succeeded J. E. Aldred as president of SWP in 1933.

Smith had been associated with the SWP's major hydroelectric developments for the company's first 40 years - Shawinigan-2, Grand-Mère, La Gabelle, Rapide-Blanc and La Tuque generating stations – as well as management of the Saint-Maurtice River which gained him the title of "Architect of the Saint-Maurice". He was also involved with the design and construction of the des Cèdres power station in the Soulanges sector of the Saint Larence River together with Montreal Light, Heat and Power between 1913 and 1915.

Smith's work provided SWP with a reputation for excellence and innovation in engineering. Under his leadership, the company developed expertise in managing power generation from rivers, doubling the productivity of Quebec's rivers. As well, the electric boilers developed by SWO's engineers allowed the company to make use of its surplus of electricity during the Great Depression of the 1930s. In 1919, SWP established a consulting engineering firm, Shawinigan Engineering.

Smith sat on the boards of directors of several companies, including Quebec Power, Canadian Light & Power, Montreal Light, Heat and Power, Dominion Bridge Company Limited, Saguenay Power Company and The Royal Bank of Canada. He was president of the Montreal Tramways Company, a precursor of the Société de transport de Montréal, from 1924 to 1939. In 1928, he was president of the Engineering Institute of Canada, and he was named as a governor (member of the board of directors) of McGill University in 1931. He was a member of several professional associations, including the Institution of Civil Engineers in the United Kingdom.

Smith died at his home on Sydenham Avenue in Westmount on June 24, 1939, after a long illness. He was 60 years old.

== Honours ==
- Honorary doctorates from McGill University and Queen's University
- The Julian C. Smith Medal was established after his death. Awarded annually by the Engineering Institute of Canada, the medal is awarded for "Achievement in the Development of Canada".

== See also ==
- Julian C. Smith Medal
- Shawinigan Water and Power Company
