= Burlington Bay James N. Allan Skyway =

Highway bridge in Hamilton and Burlington, Ontario, Canada

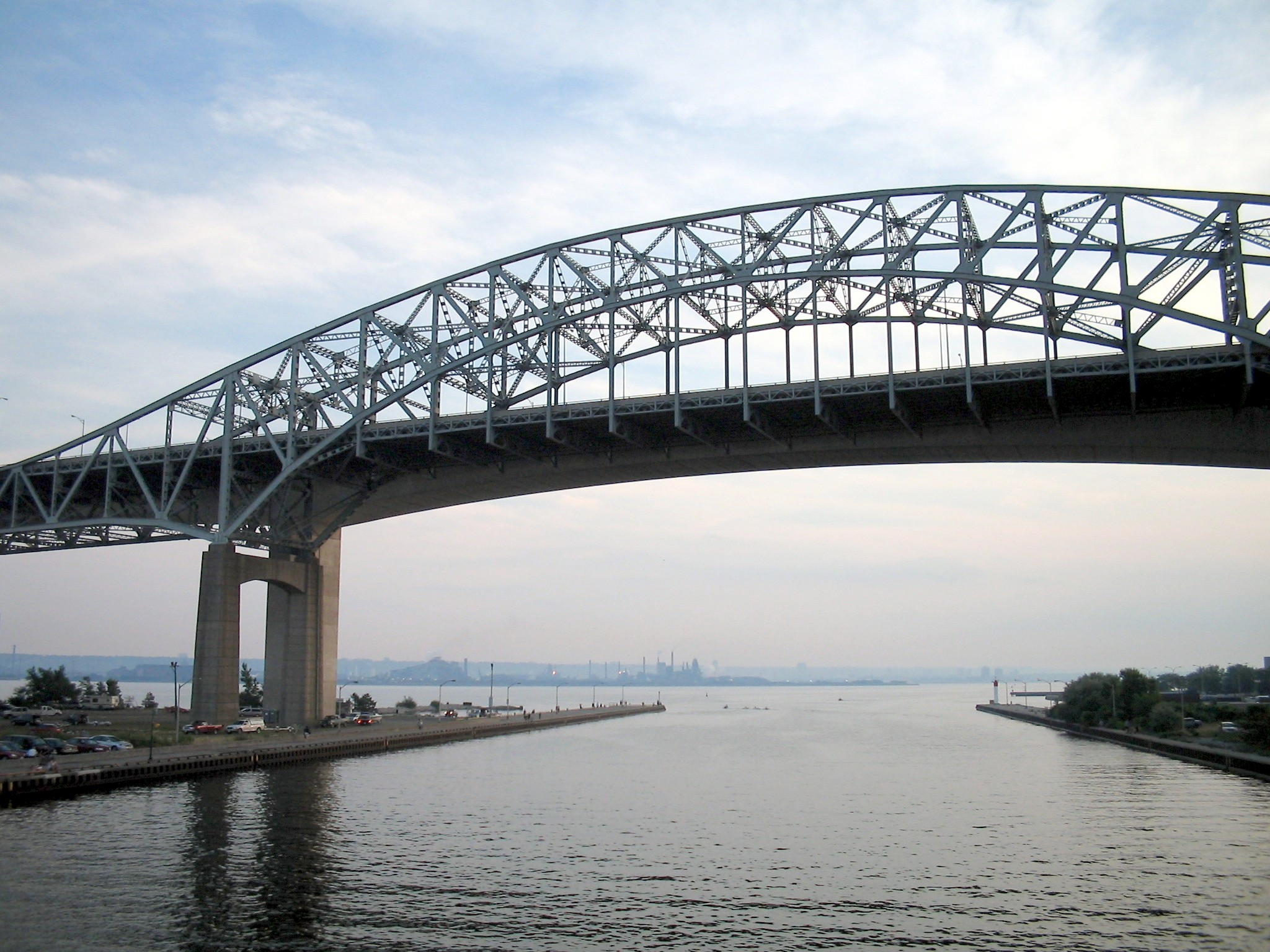
- The Burlington Bay James N. Allan Skyway, taken in July 2004. The 1958 steel arch span carries QEW Toronto-bound traffic, and is in front of the 1985 concrete span, which carries Niagara-bound traffic. In the background is the Hamilton Harbour.
- Coordinates: 43.29945°N 79.79799°W
- Carries: 8 lanes of Queen Elizabeth Way
- Crosses: Hamilton Harbour
- Locale: Hamilton, Ontario and Burlington, Ontario
- Other name: Burlington Skyway
- Owner: Government of Ontario
- Maintained by: Ontario Ministry of Transportation

Characteristics
- Design: steel through arch bridge - 1958 span Concrete box girder - 1985 span
- Total length: 2,560 metres (8,400 ft) - 1958 span 2,215 metres (7,267 ft) - 1985 span
- Width: 30 metres (98 ft)
- Height: 64 metres (210 ft)
- Longest span: 151 metres (495 ft) - 1958 span
- Clearance below: 36.7 metres (120 ft) - 1958 span

History
- Architect: John Turner Bell
- Designer: Philip Louis Pratley
- Construction cost: CA$12 million to CA$17,000,000 (equivalent to $183,640,000 in 2025)
- Opened: October 30, 1958 (Northbound structure); October 11, 1985 (Southbound structure)
- Rebuilt: 1985–88 (1958 span)

Statistics
- Daily traffic: 149,000 per day (2014)
- Toll: 1958–1973

Location
- Interactive map of Burlington Bay James N. Allan Skyway

The Burlington Bay James N. Allan Skyway, originally called the Burlington Bay Skyway and simply known as the Burlington Skyway or The Skyway, is a pair of high-level freeway bridges (built in 1958 and 1985, respectively) spanning the Burlington Bay Canal in Hamilton and Burlington, Ontario, Canada. The bridges are part of the Queen Elizabeth Way (QEW) highway linking Fort Erie with Toronto.

The 1958 bridge is a suspended deck steel through-arch truss bridge. The approach to the main span has elements of a through-truss bridge, but the arch shape takes the truss higher than the roadway deck, so hangers are used to suspend the deck from the arch truss. The truss bridge is 2,560 m (8,400 ft) long overall. The main span of 151 m (495 ft) is flanked by two back spans each 83.7 m (275 ft) long; there are 72 total approach spans, and the bridge has 36.7 m (120 ft) of vertical clearance below the bottom of the deck. The 1985 bridge, a conventional precast concrete box girder structure, is 335 m (1,099 ft) shorter. The roadway deck for each bridge is 30 m (97 ft) wide.

== History ==
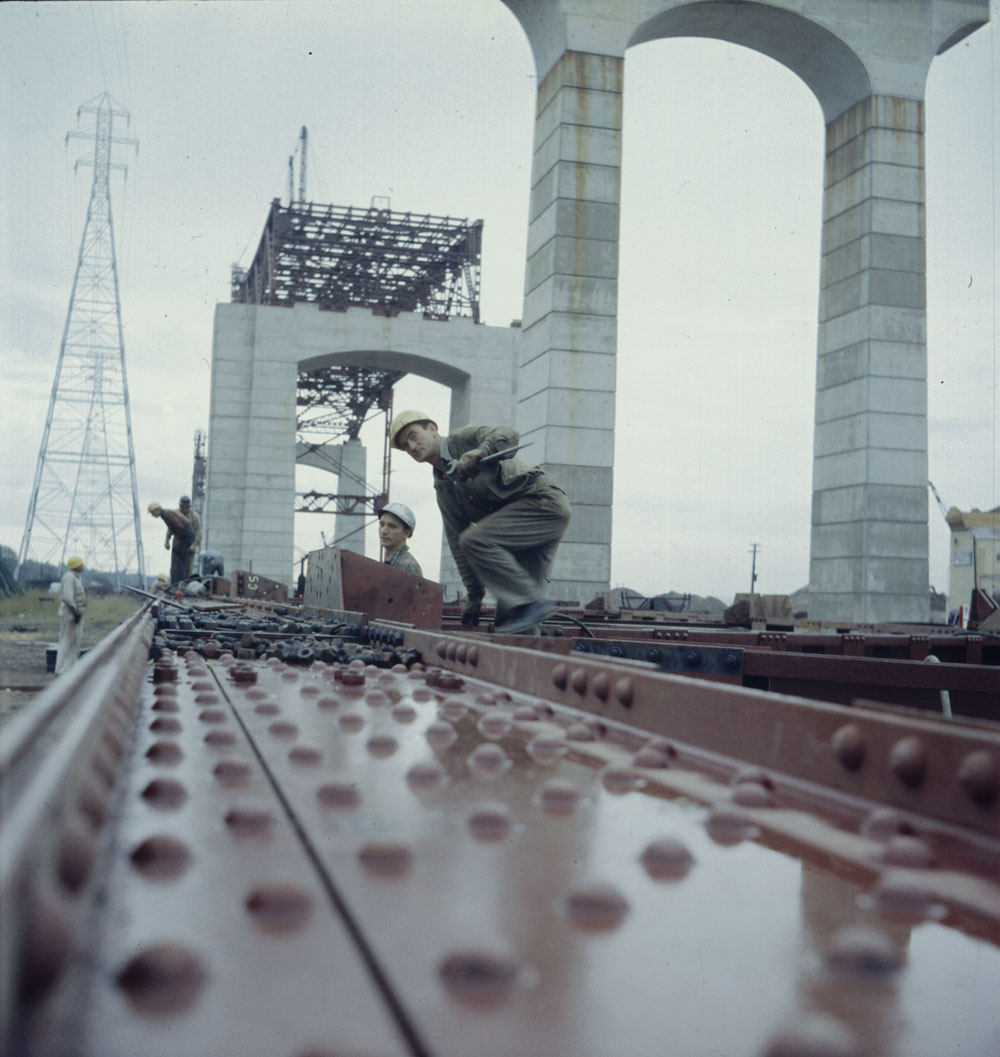
Construction of the skyway in 1957.

The first bridge (steel structure) officially opened on October 30, 1958, crossing the narrow bar separating Hamilton Harbour and the Port of Hamilton from Lake Ontario. This allows for Great Lakes ship traffic to flow underneath while four lanes of Golden Horseshoe road traffic may flow on top of it, neither disturbing the other. The bridge was designed by John Turner Bell. Construction of the entire Skyway required 20,000 short tons (18,000 t) of steel and 90,000 cubic yards (69,000 m^{3}) of concrete.

The bridge had tolls when constructed, but these were removed on December 28, 1973 after they were found to heavily impede traffic flow. The toll plaza was located near Tower's Drive. Truck drivers in particular had refused to take the tolled bridge since not only were they charged the full toll but also it took them extra fuel to ascend the Skyway. With the lifting of tolls on the bridge, trucks were then banned from using Beach Boulevard.

The bridge was twinned in 1985 after traffic volumes exceeded its capacity in the early 1980s. The 1985 bridge was a conventional precast concrete box girder. When the new skyway (concrete structure) was opened on October 11, 1985, traffic was temporarily rerouted to it so that the old bridge could be extensively rehabilitated. This work was completed on August 22, 1988. Afterwards, there were eight lanes of traffic crossing the harbour.

The twinning project also saw a major upgrade of the freeway approaches to the bridge. The entire project resulted in the QEW being widened to eight lanes from Burlington Street to Highway 403, with modern Parclo interchanges at Burlington Street, Northshore Boulevard (former Highway 2), and Fairview Street/Plains Road. This section has a variable lighting system to overcome the frequent fog found in the area. It is also the site of Ontario's first freeway traffic management system which incorporates traffic cameras and changeable message signs.

The original name of the first bridge was the Burlington Bay Skyway. After it was twinned, the proposed names of James N. Allan Skyway (in honour of the Ontario Minister of Highways James Noble Allan, who had championed the 1958 bridge) and James N. Allan Burlington Bay Skyway were rejected. The official name since 1988 has been Burlington Bay James N. Allan Skyway.

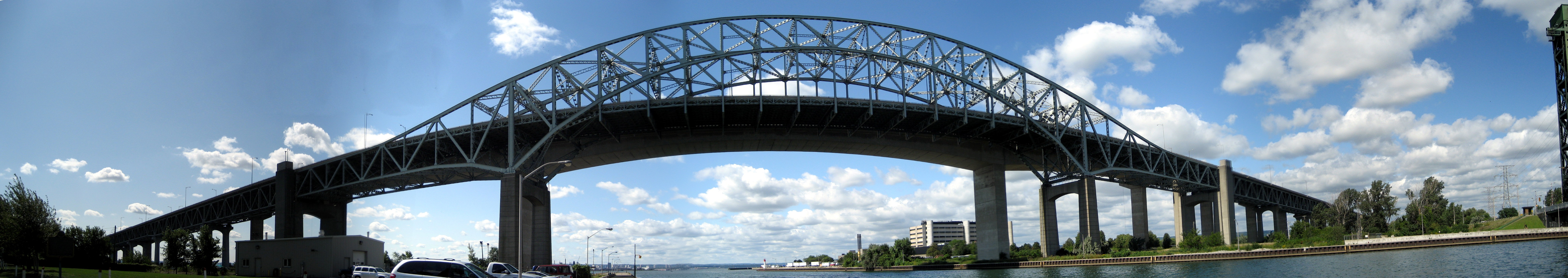
Panoramic view of Burlington Bay James N. Allan Skyway Bridge, near Beach Boulevard.

In fall 2008, most of the older Aluminum Tapered Leg (ATL) overhead sign gantries (commonly referred by the MTO as a "Type 1" structure) which had been installed back in the late 1980s were replaced with the newer triangular truss gantries. This included the overhead gantry signage for exit 97 on the northbound span of the skyway.

On July 31, 2014, a man driving a dump truck in its raised position crashed onto the top of the bridge frame on the Toronto-bound lanes. The bridge was closed for the weekend to make temporary repairs; permanent repairs to the bridge structure took seven months and cost $1.224 million. The driver was charged with impaired driving and tried in 2016, resulting in a conviction for dangerous driving in March 2016 and a one-year jail sentence. His conviction and sentence were upheld by the Ontario Court of Appeal.

== See also ==
- Garden City Skyway
- Gerald Desmond Bridge, a 1968 through-arch in Long Beach with similar design
- List of bridges in Canada
