= Upper Centennial Parkway (Hamilton, Ontario) =

Road in Hamilton, Canada

Upper Centennial Parkway is a mountain-access road in Hamilton, Ontario, Canada. Also known as Hamilton Highway 20, the road begins at its north end at Centennial Parkway in the Lower City of Hamilton beside Battlefield Park, and extends south up the Niagara Escarpment and southward across the mountain where it ends at Rymal Road. It is a two-way street throughout. South of Rymal Road, it continues as Regional Road 56.

It is named Upper Centennial Parkway because it is in alignment with Centennial Parkway in Lower City Hamilton.

== Landmarks ==
Note: Listing of landmarks from North to South.

- Battlefield Park
- Canadian Pacific railway line
- Bruce Trail
- Niagara Escarpment

== Communities ==
Note: Listing of neighbourhoods from North to South.

- Gershome
- Heritage Green
- Leckie Park
- Elfrida

== Roads that cross Upper Centennial Parkway ==
Note: Listing of streets from North to South.

- Green Mountain Road, West/East
- Mud Street, West/East
- Highland Road, West/East
- Rymal Road East
