= Centennial Parkway =

Road in Hamilton, Ontario, Canada

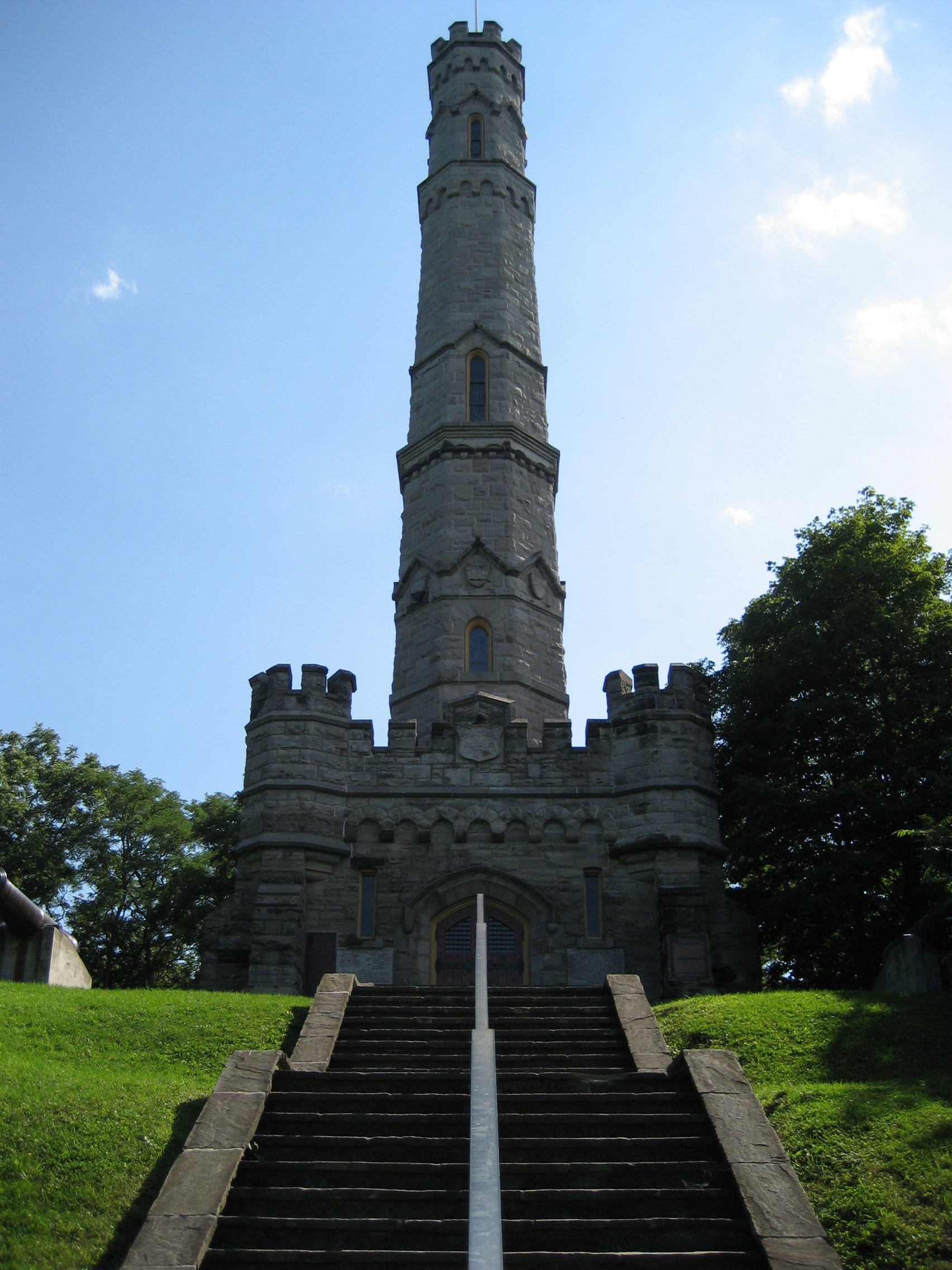
Stoney Creek Battlefield Monument

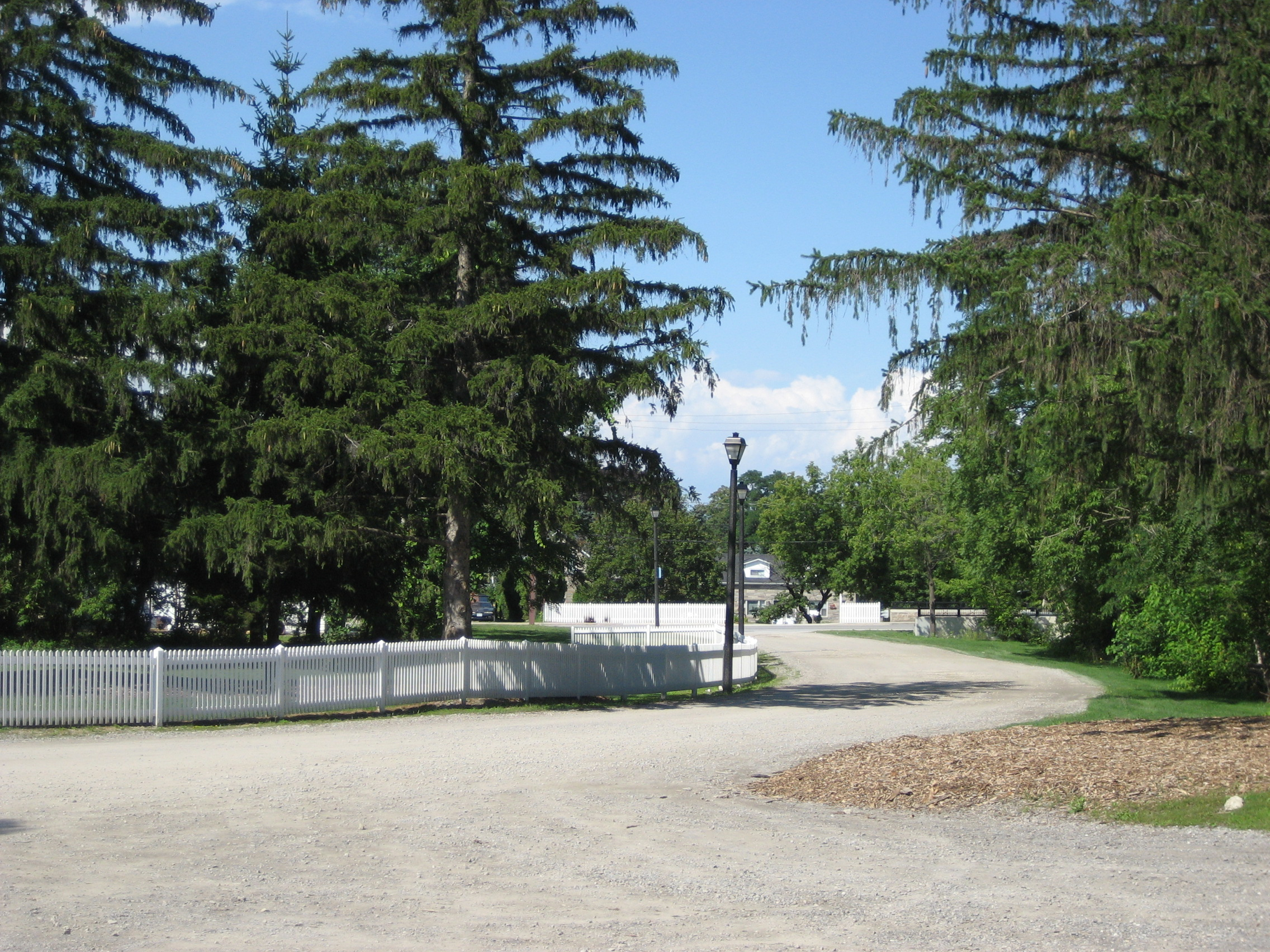
Battlefield Park Entrance

Centennial Parkway is an arterial road in southeastern Hamilton, Ontario, Canada. It is best known as the western terminus of the former Highway 20, now maintained by the City of Hamilton. It starts off as Upper Centennial Parkway, a mountain-access road in the City right before the Canadian Pacific Railway line at the backend of Battlefield Park, and is a two-way street throughout that extends north over the Queen Elizabeth Way and ends at Beach Boulevard/Van Wagners Beach Road in front of Confederation Park.

== History ==
In the late 1920s, the Department of Highways assumed the route north of the Hamilton & Queenston Provincial Highway (Highway 8) as Provincial Highway 8A, a quick connector to Highway 2 via Hamilton Beach (the site of the current Burlington Bay James N. Allan Skyway bridge). It was renamed Highway 20 when the route connecting it to Niagara Falls was completed, and a traffic circle (bisected by a railway) was created for the intersection with the Queen Elizabeth Way, completed in 1939. A series of provincial downloads in the late 1990s saw the majority of Highway 20 downloaded to municipal and regional authorities; the City of Hamilton now maintains the entire route within its borders as (Upper) Centennial Parkway, or "Hamilton Highway 20".

The Battle of Stoney Creek was fought on June 6, 1813, during the War of 1812 near present day Stoney Creek, Ontario. British units made a night attack on an American encampment. Due in large part to the capture of both American brigadier generals, and an overestimation of British strength by the Americans, the battle was a victory for the British, and a turning point in the defence of Upper Canada.

Battlefield House, built in 1796, and fifteen and one-half acres of parkland, (Battlefield Park), was property of the Women's Wentworth Historical Society, (1899–1962), and given by this society to the Niagara Parks Commission as a National historical site on January 19, 1962.

One can reach the Bruce Trail via Centennial Parkway South. From this point southwards the road is then known as Upper Centennial Parkway and is one of many mountain-access roads in the city. The Bruce trail cuts through Hamilton along the Niagara Escarpment (mountain) and used by many locals for a full days hike. The Trail is over 690 kilometres long and starts at Niagara Falls, passes through Hamilton and ends at the Bruce Peninsula. Hikers are led to scenic gorges, hidden waterfalls and places of quiet charm.

Picnickers have an excellent choice of numerous parks in Hamilton. Confederation Park is a popular lakeside retreat for those who wish to pack a lunch and go. Camping facilities are also available for extended visits. The park also has playgrounds, beaches and Wild Waterworks, which features the largest outdoor wave pool in the world, waterslides, lazy river, batting cages, mini put and a picnic area.

== Landmarks ==
Note: Listing of Landmarks from North to South.

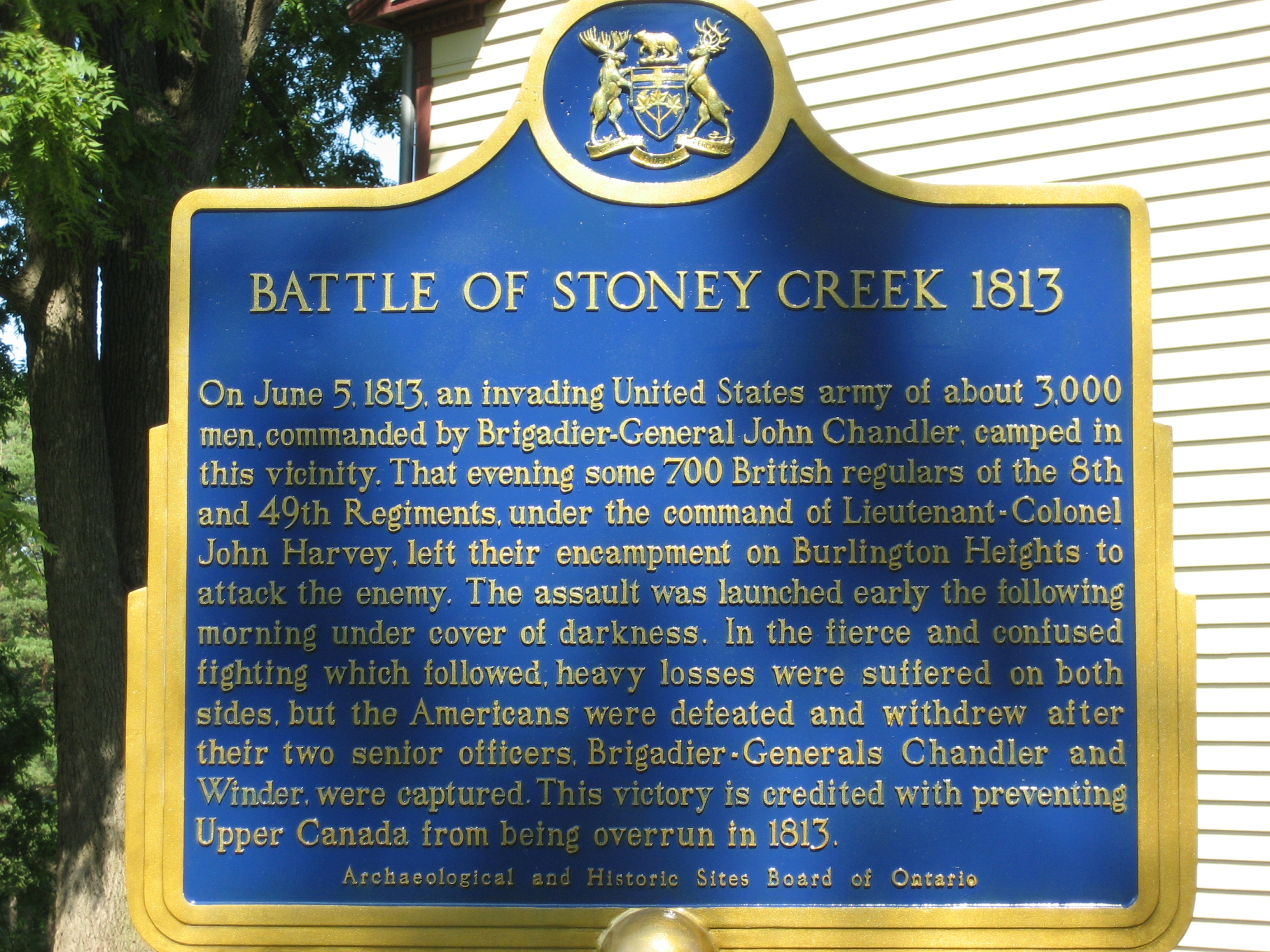
Battle of Stoney Creek

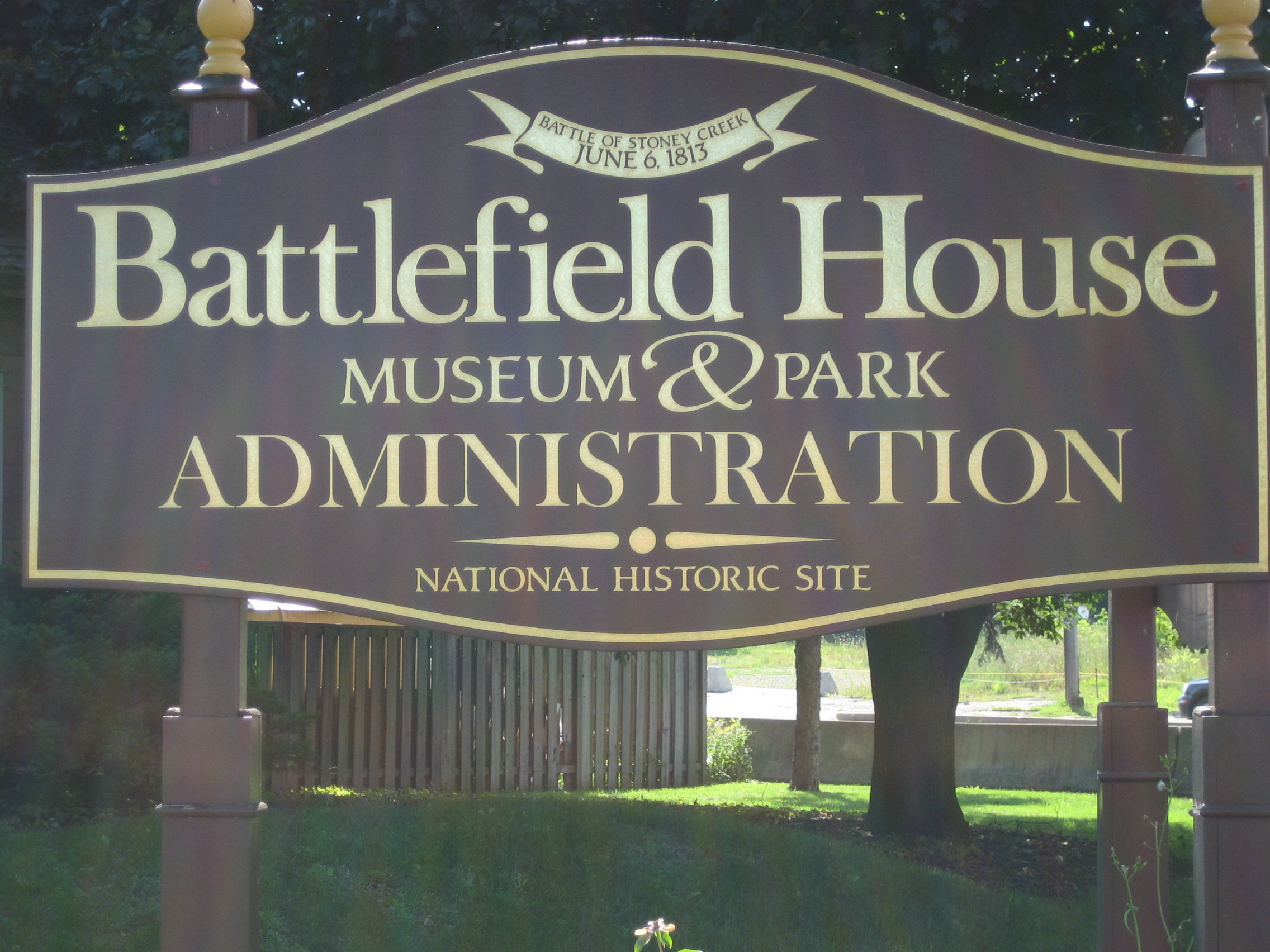

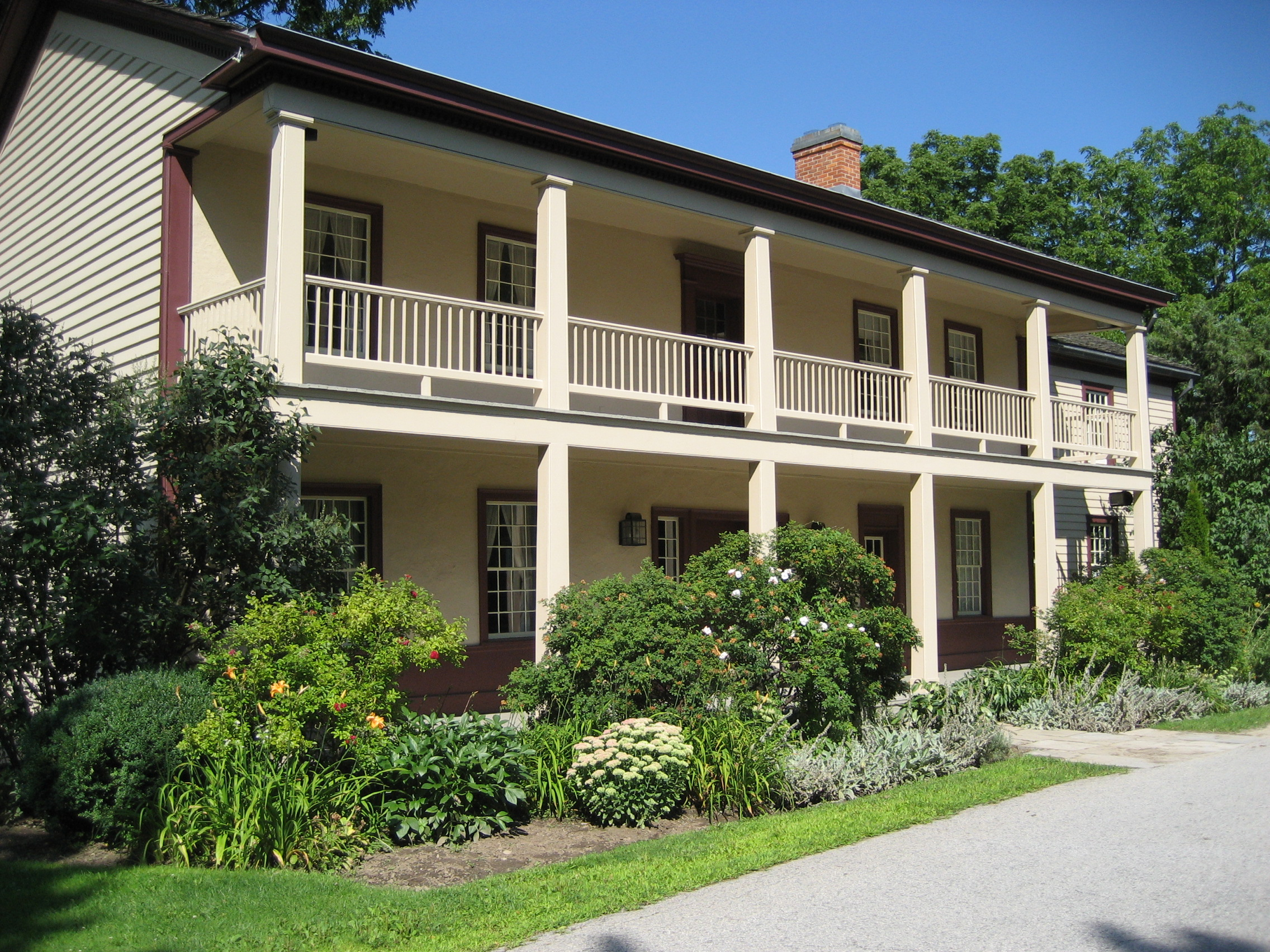
Stoney Creek Battlefield House

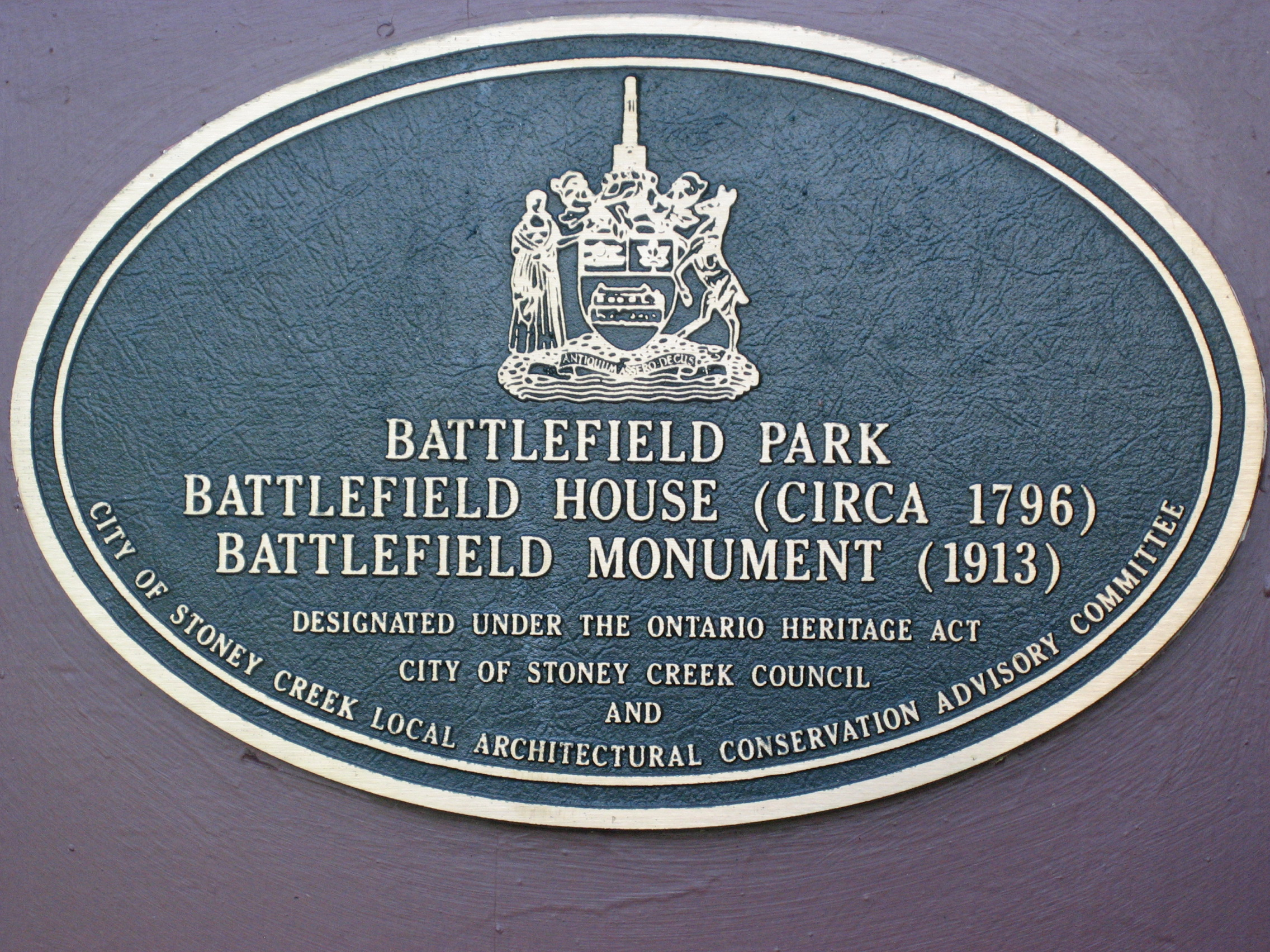
Stoney Creek Battlefield House

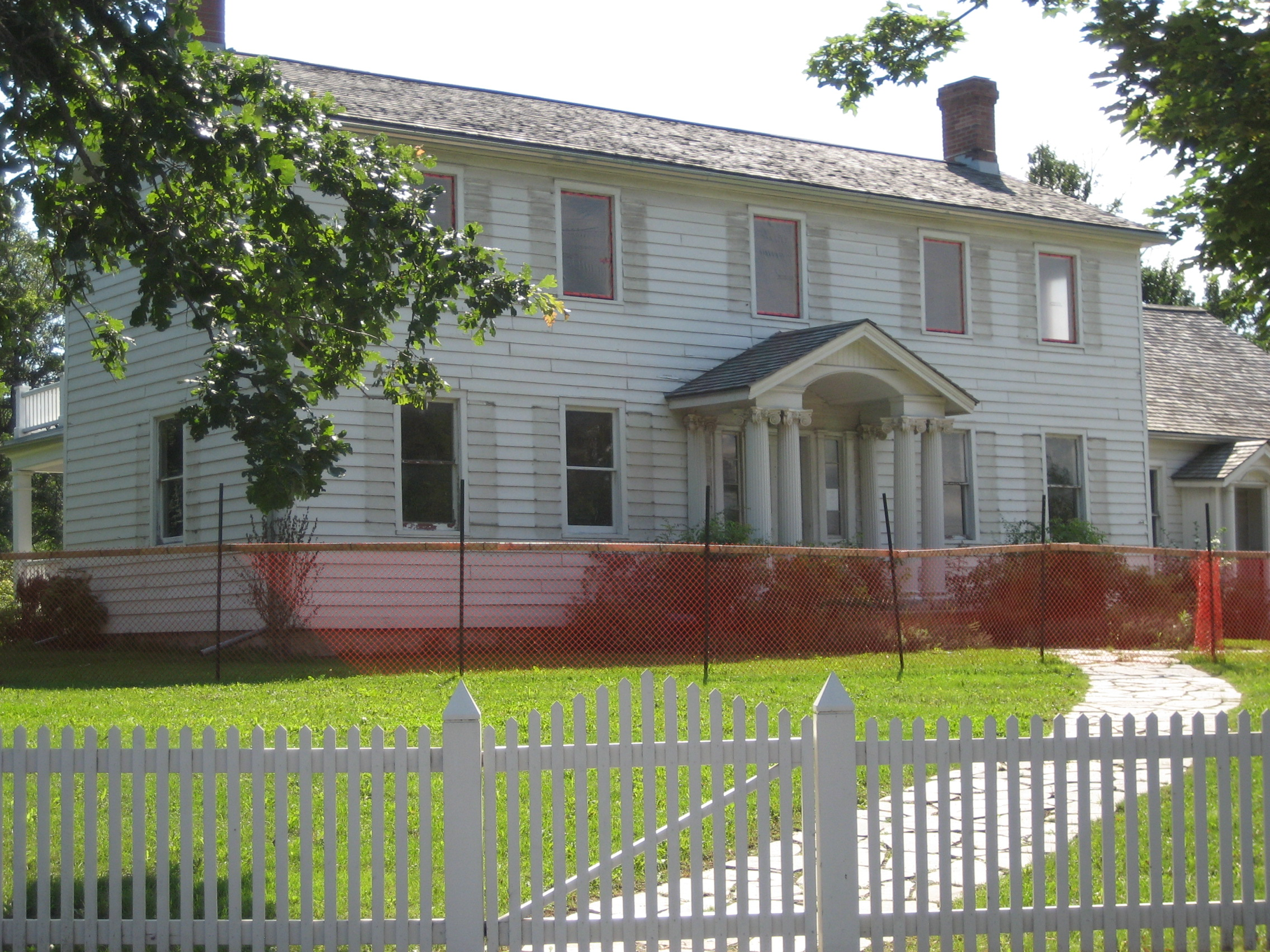
Nash-Jackson House, built in 1818, under renovations 2008

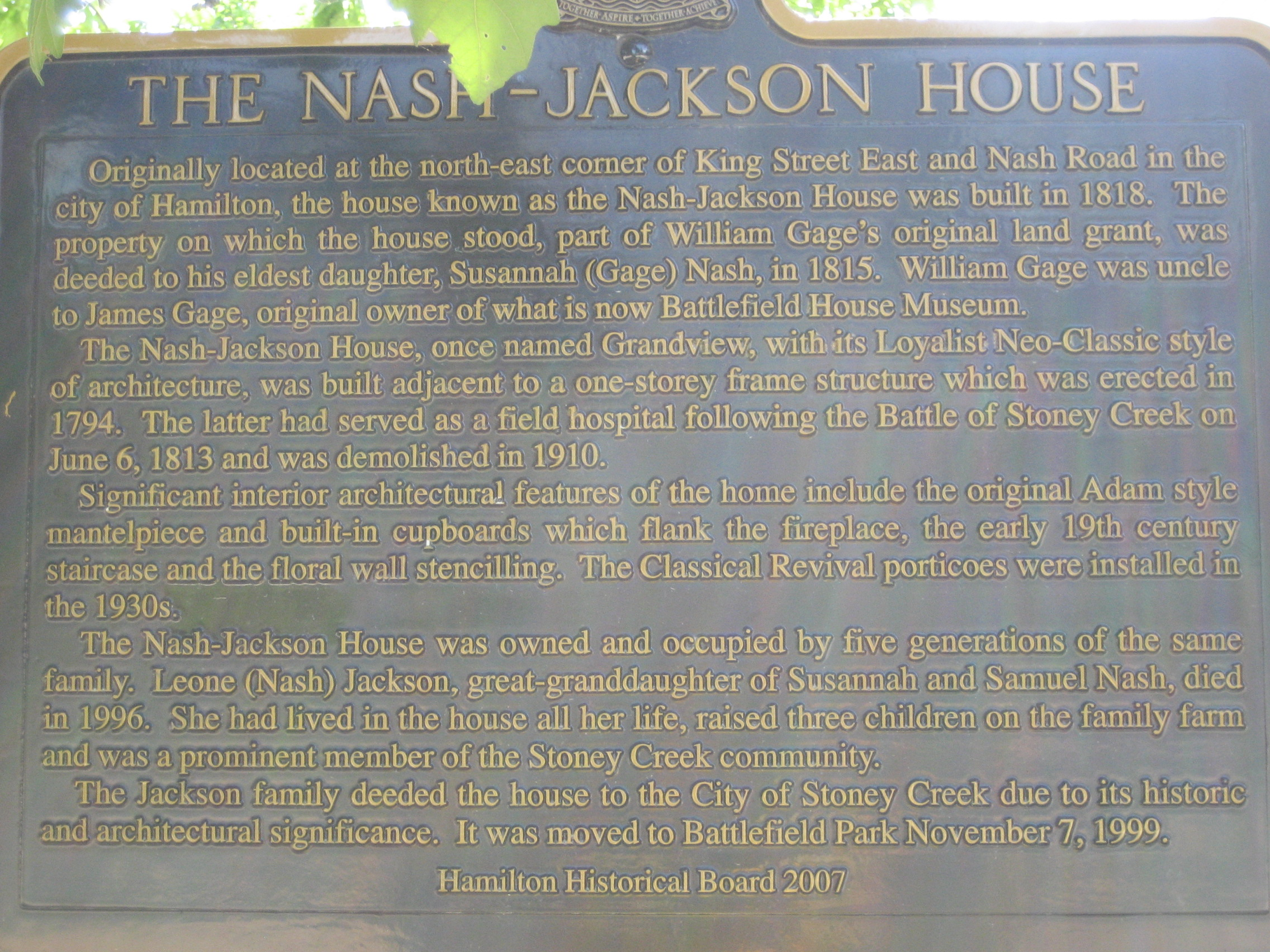
Nash-Jackson House

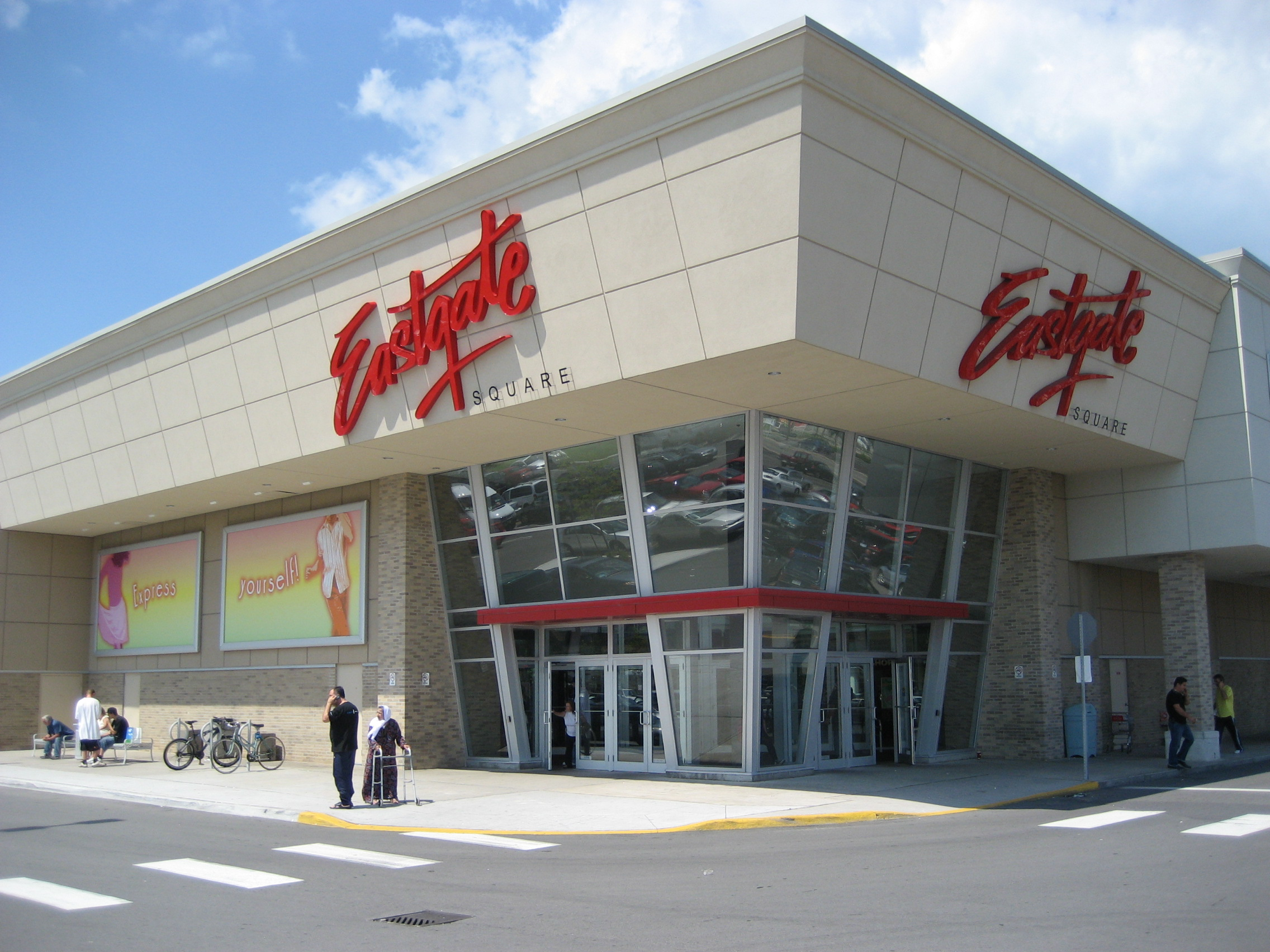
Eastgate Square, Mall

- Van Wagner's Beach (off Van Wagner's Beach Road)
- Confederation Park
  - Wild Waterworks, (at Confederation Park)
- Parkway Plaza (shopping)
- Eastgate Square (Mall)
- Gulliver Square (shopping)
- Battlefield Square Plaza (shopping)
- Cardinal Newman Secondary School
- Stoney Creek Cemetery
- The Nash-Jackson House
- Stoney Creek Battlefield Park, where the Battle of Stoney Creek took place during the War of 1812.
  - Battlefield House
  - Soney Creek Battlefield Monument
- Upper Centennial Parkway, a Mountain-access road
- Bruce Trail, many waterfalls found along this trail.
  - Felker's Falls
  - Little Davis Falls
  - Glover's Falls
  - Billy Green Falls
  - Devil's Punch Bowl
- Mountain Face Park
- Niagara Escarpment (mountain)

== Communities ==
Note: Listing of neighbourhoods from North to South

- Nashdale/ Lakely, Centennial Parkway is the division between these two neighbourhoods.
- Kentley/ Riverdale West, Centennial Parkway is the division line between these two neighbourhoods.
- Greenford

== See also ==
- List of streets in Hamilton, Ontario
