= Battlefield House (Stoney Creek, Ontario) =

House in Hamilton, Ontario, Canada

Coordinates: 43°13′03″N 79°45′58″W

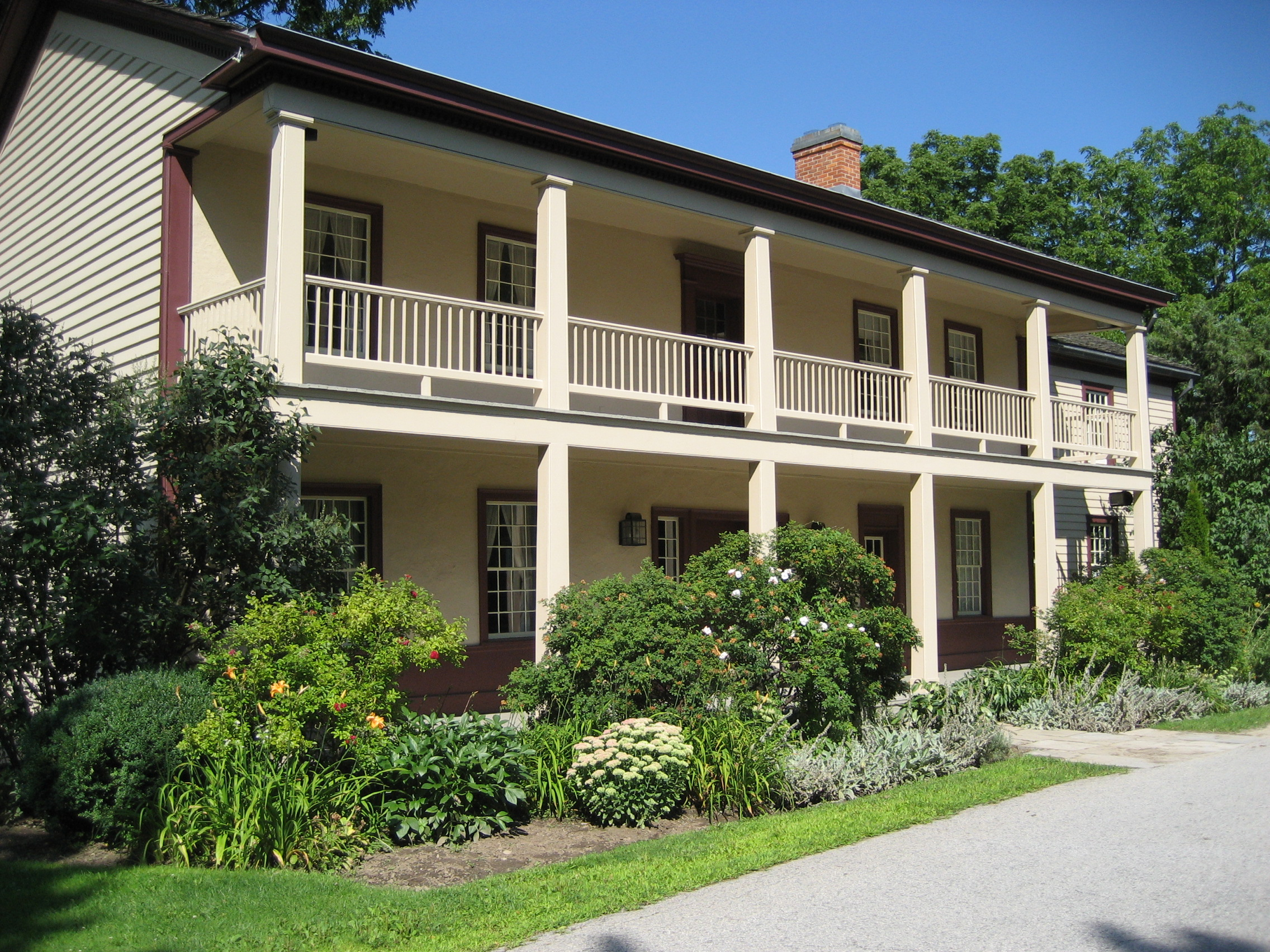
- Established: 1962
- Location: Stoney Creek, Hamilton, Ontario, Canada.
- Type: National Historic Site of Canada
- Website: Official site

Battlefield House, also known as Gage House, near King Street East and Centennial Parkway in Stoney Creek, Hamilton, Ontario, Canada is a living history museum and site of the historic Battle of Stoney Creek on June 6, 1813, which was fought during the War of 1812. It was built in 1796. The house and 15.5 acres (6.3 ha) of parkland (Battlefield Park), were the property of the Women's Wentworth Historical Society, (1899-1962), and given by this society to the Niagara Parks Commission on January 19, 1962. The park was designated a National Historic Site in 1960.

Nestled under the Niagara Escarpment, this historic site is located on 32 acres (12.9 ha) of park land linked to the Bruce Trail. Also located on the property are the Battlefield Monument and the Grandview (Nash-Jackson House) building. Smith's Knoll Cemetery is also nearby, across King Street East from the park. During the first weekend in June, a re-enactment of the Battle of Stoney Creek is held with re-enactors in full regalia, representing both the British and American sides. The 2016 event was the 35th such re-enactment.

The re-enactments scheduled for 2020 and 2021 were cancelled due to the covid-19 pandemic. In mid-May 2022 it was revealed that the upcoming re-enactment would also be cancelled due to "uncertainty surrounding COVID-19 restrictions" and construction taking place at Battlefield House, but would return in 2023. However, at a meeting held on May 19, it was revealed that the re-enactment would be "permanently" cancelled. Friends of Battlefield Museum withdrew its support for the museum following the meeting. As of 2025, the Re-enactments have been restarted, and the 2025 events are scheduled for the weekend of June 7-8, 2025 at Battlefield House and Park.

British units made a night attack on an American encampment. Due in large part to the capture of both American brigadier generals by Sgt Alexander Fraser, and an overestimation of British strength by the Americans, the battle was a victory for the British, and a turning point in the defence of Upper Canada.

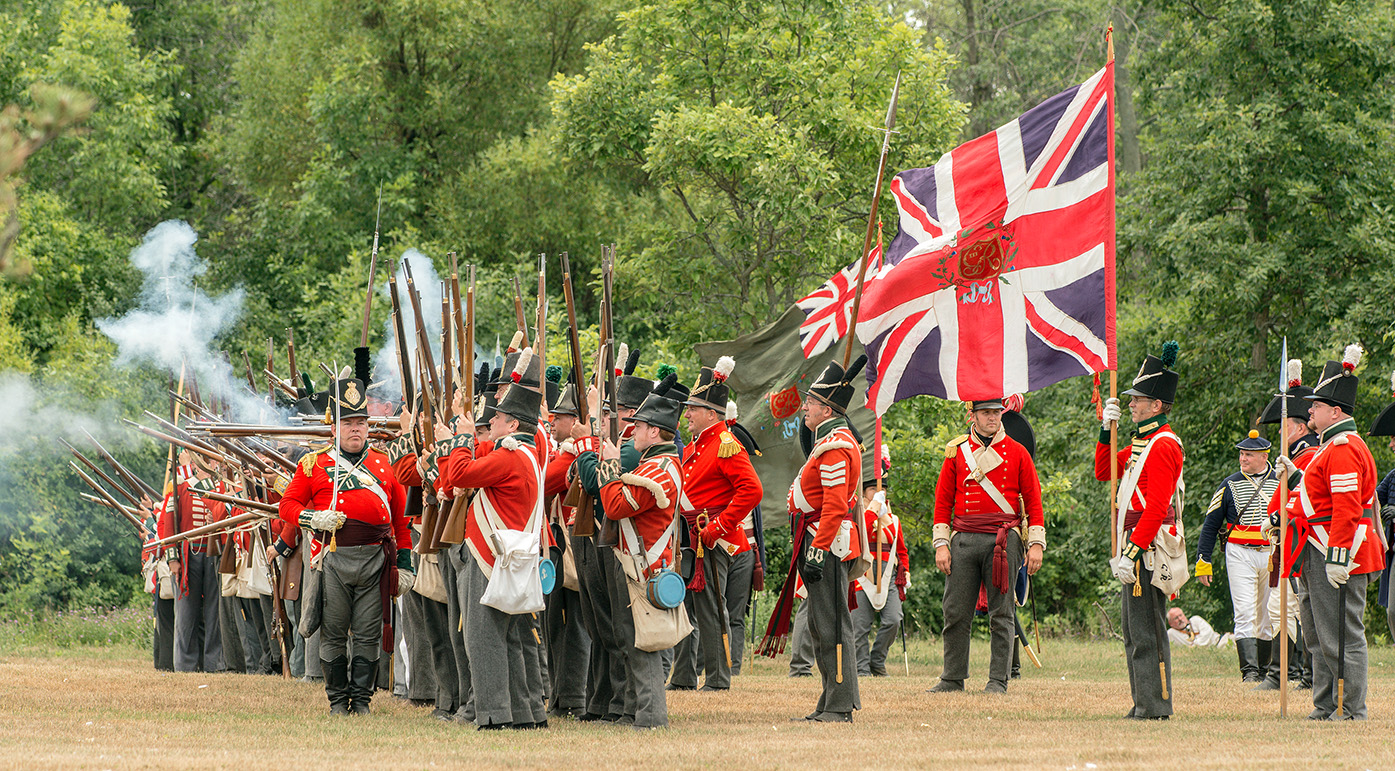
War of 1812 Re-enactment, Stoney Creek, Ontario, an annual event (June) at Battlefield House

The museum is affiliated with: CMA, CHIN, and Virtual Museum of Canada.

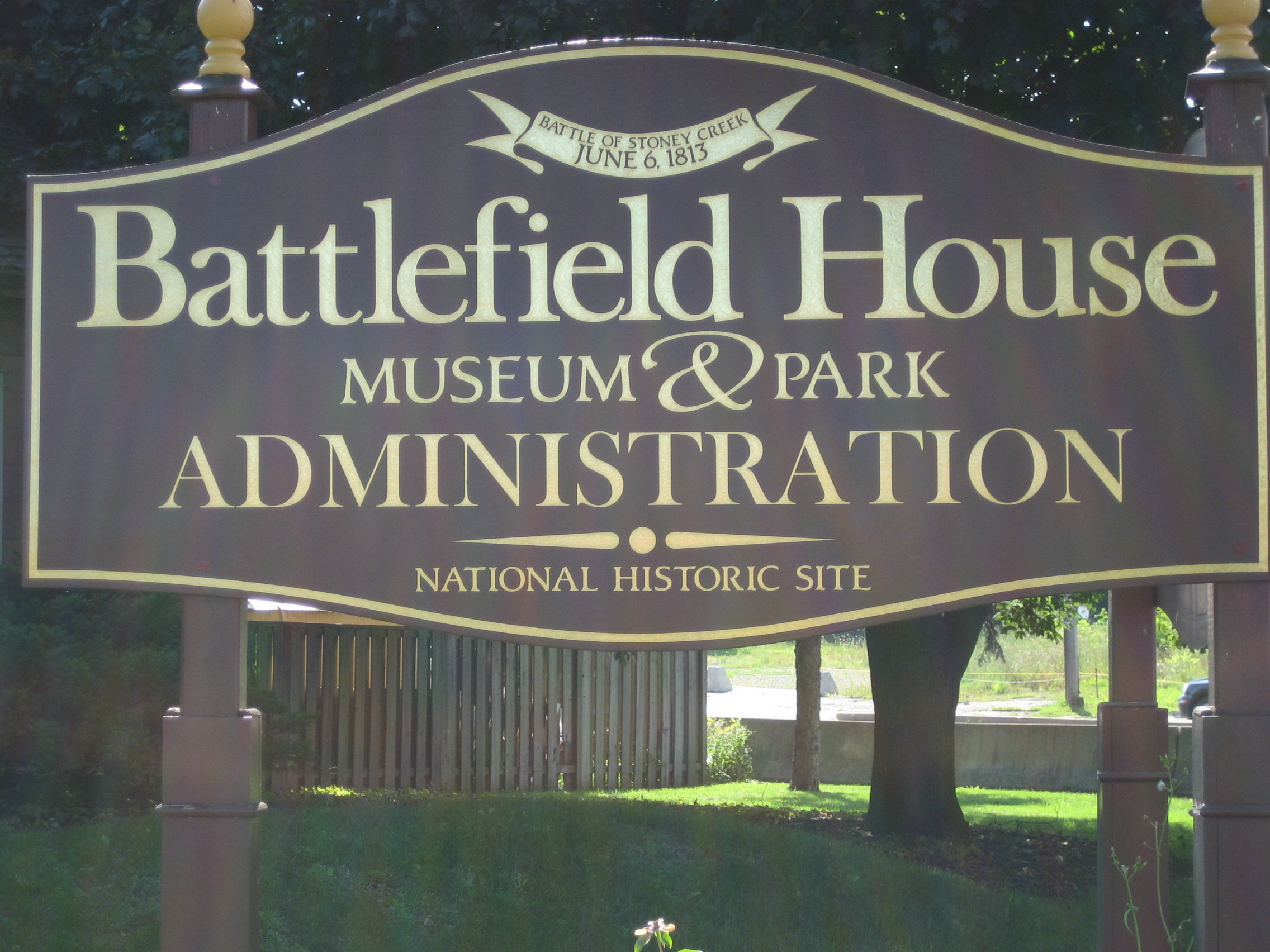

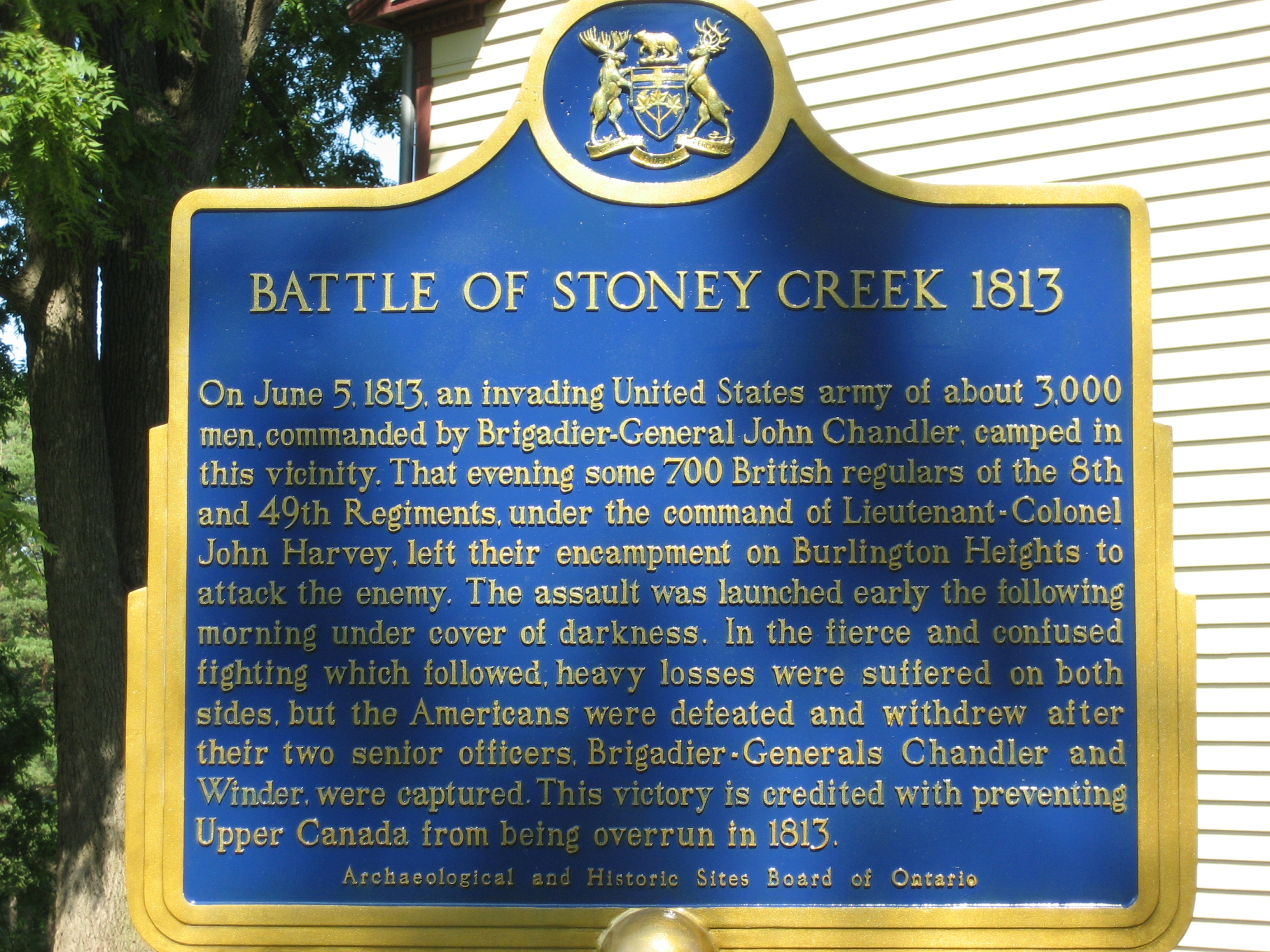
Battle of Stoney Creek

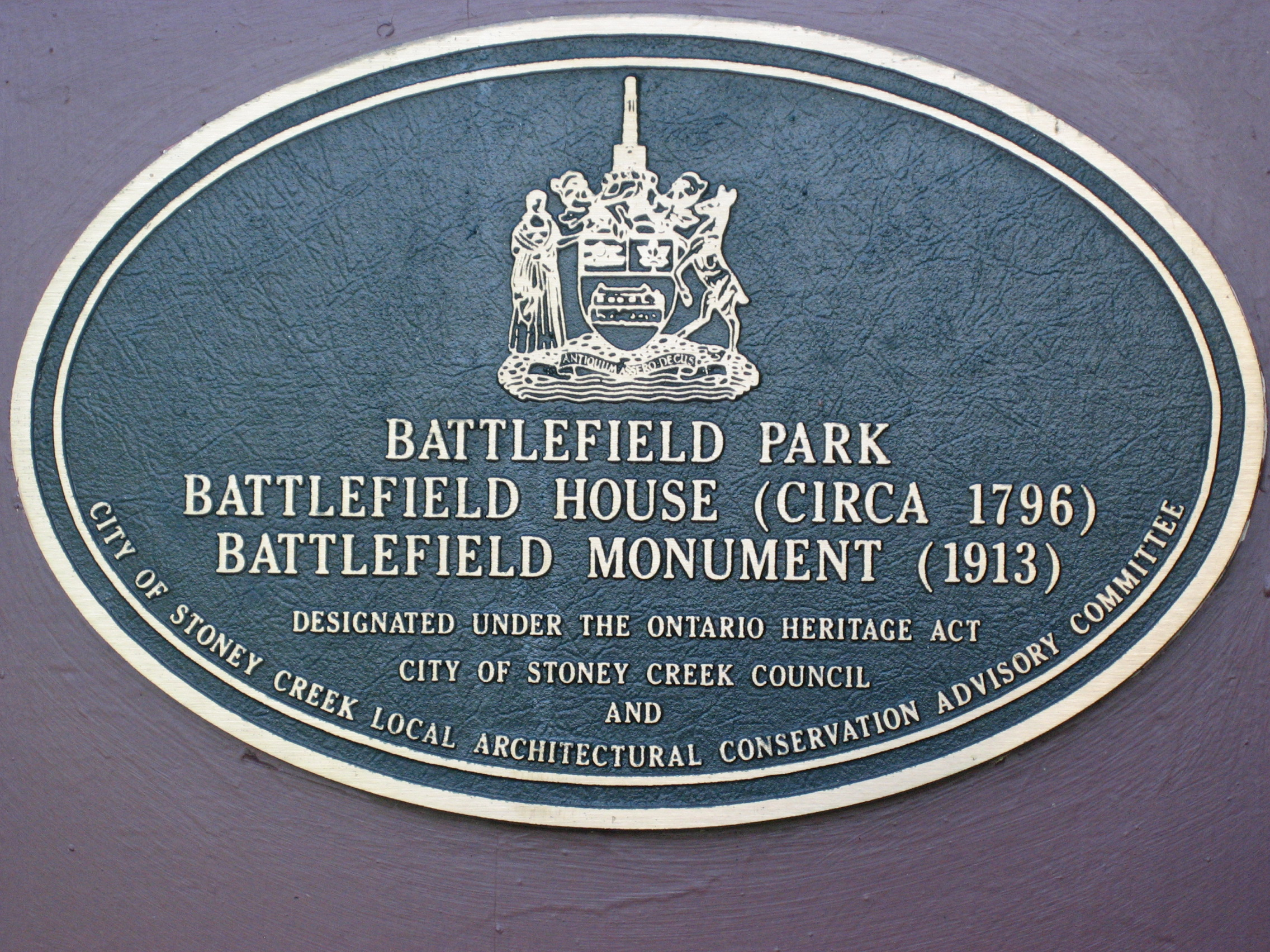
Stoney Creek Battlefield House

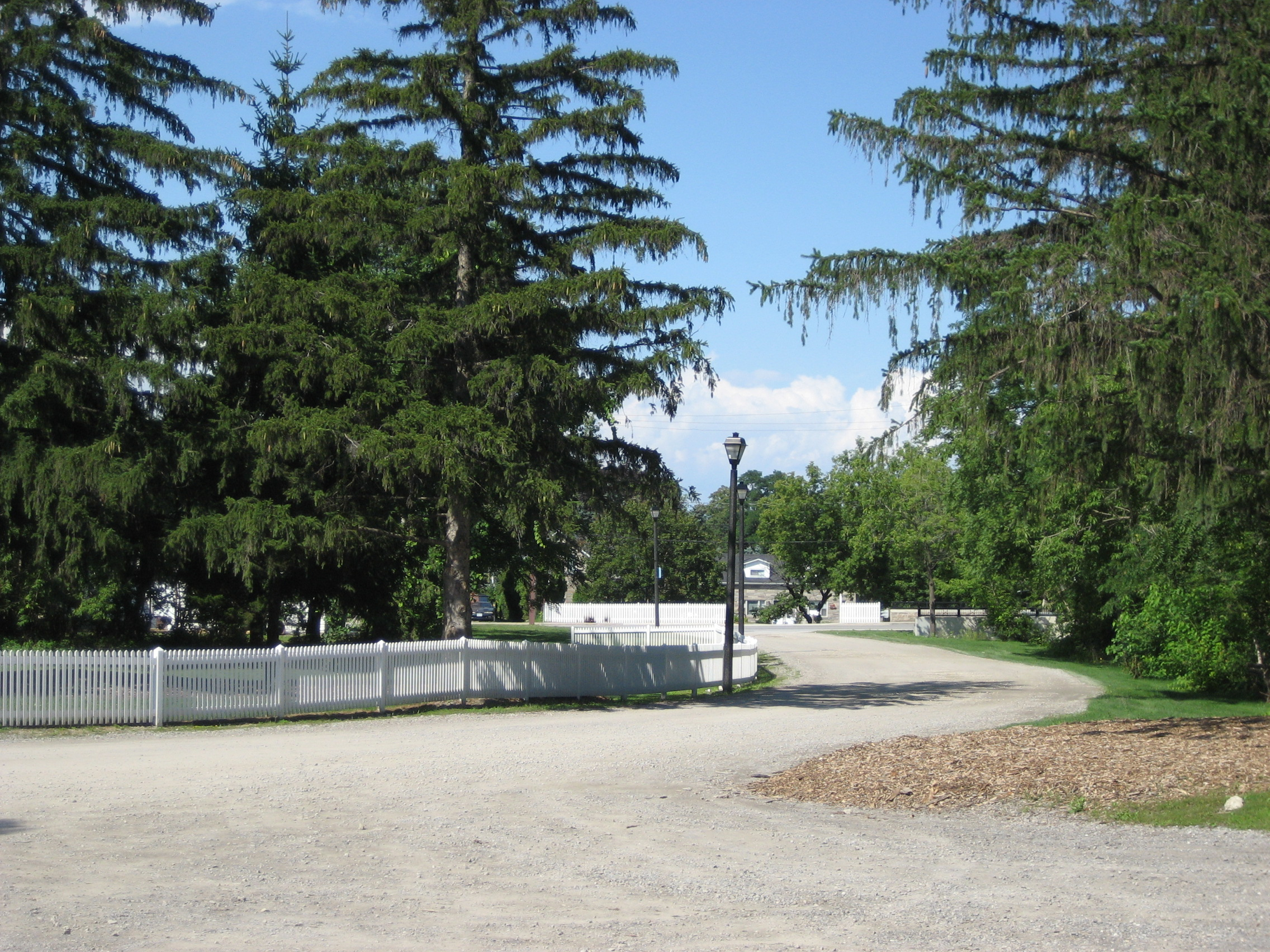
Battlefield Park Entrance

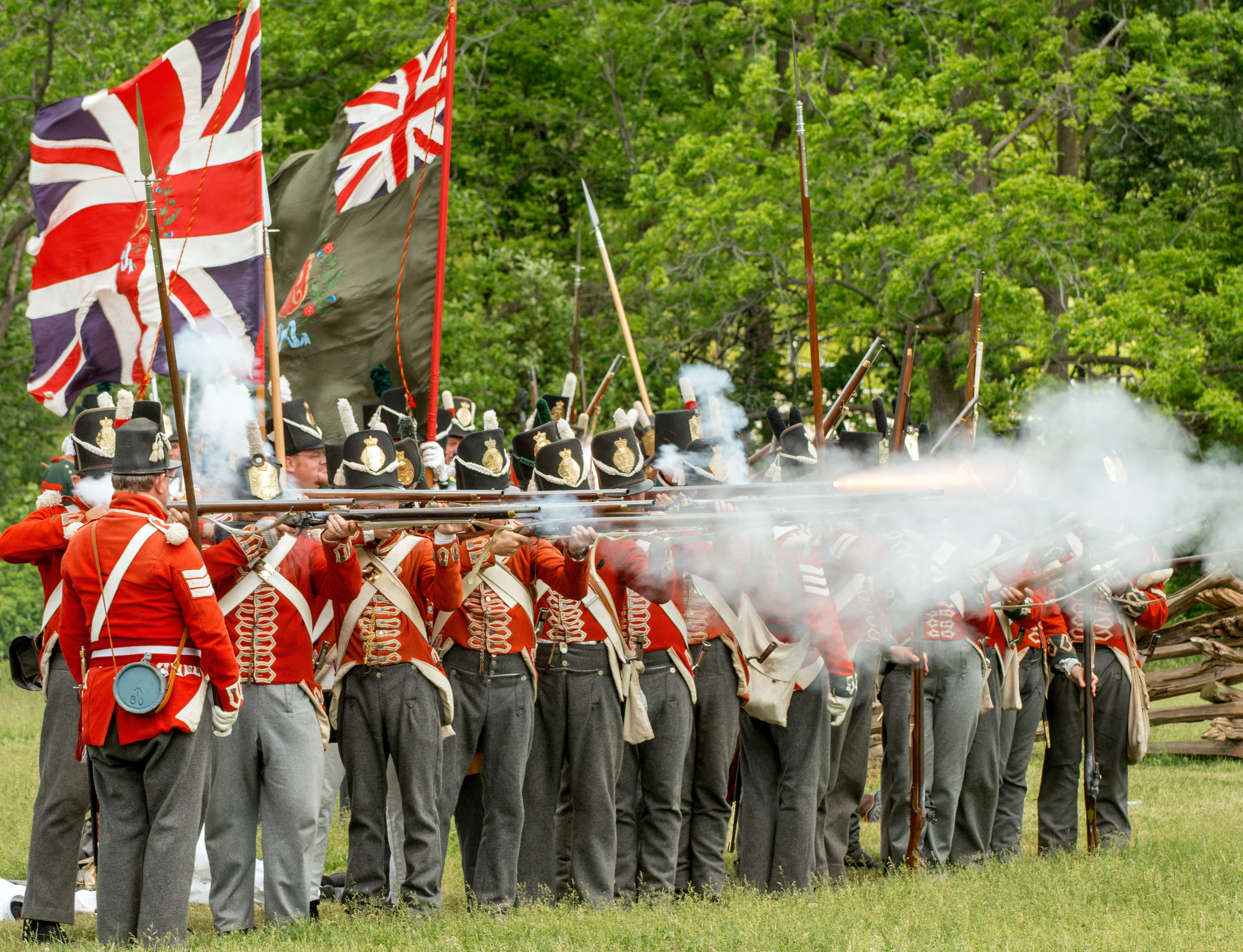
Re-enactors (in UK uniforms) fire muskets toward the "Americans" in annual commemorations

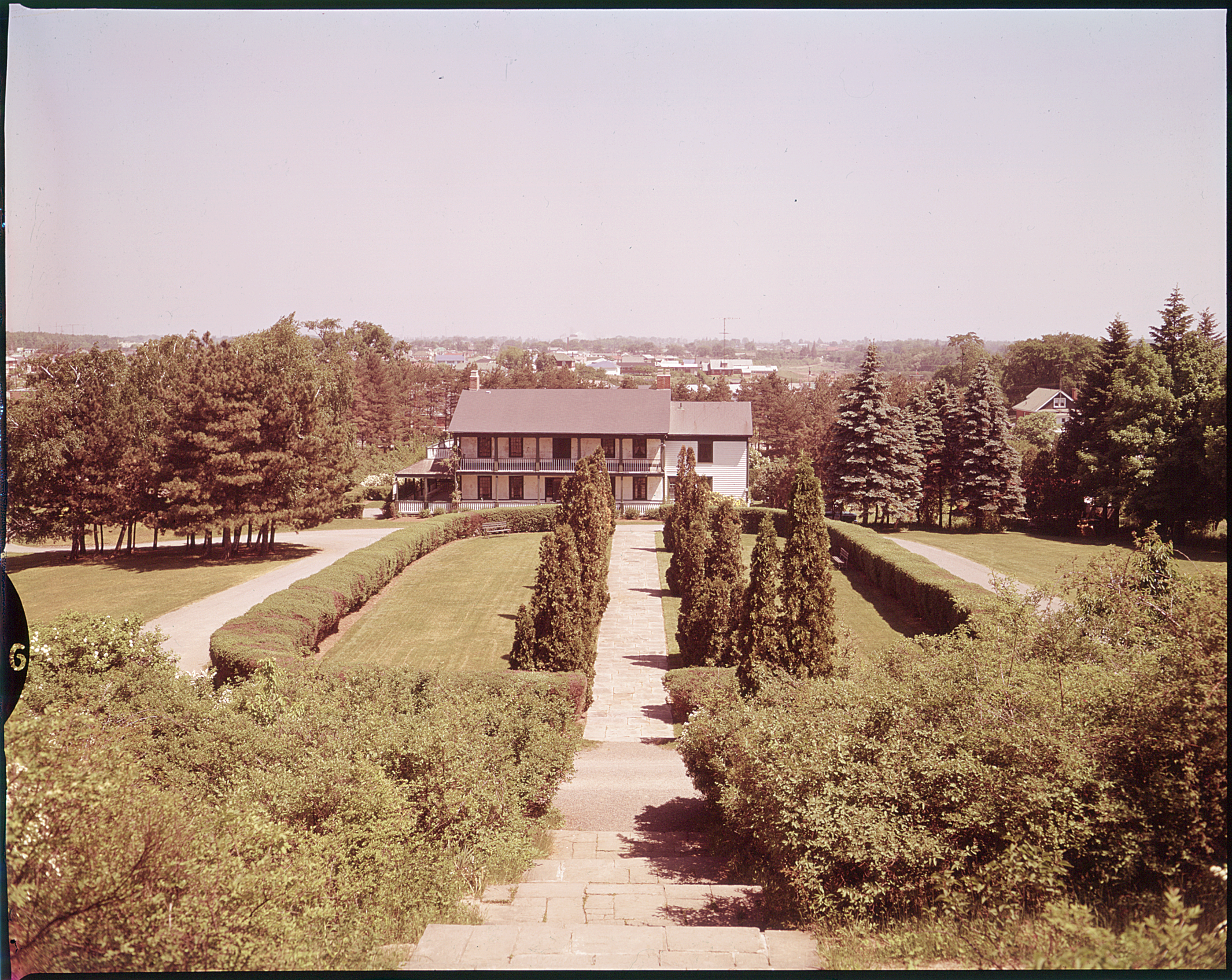
Battlefield House in Stoney Creek, 1959

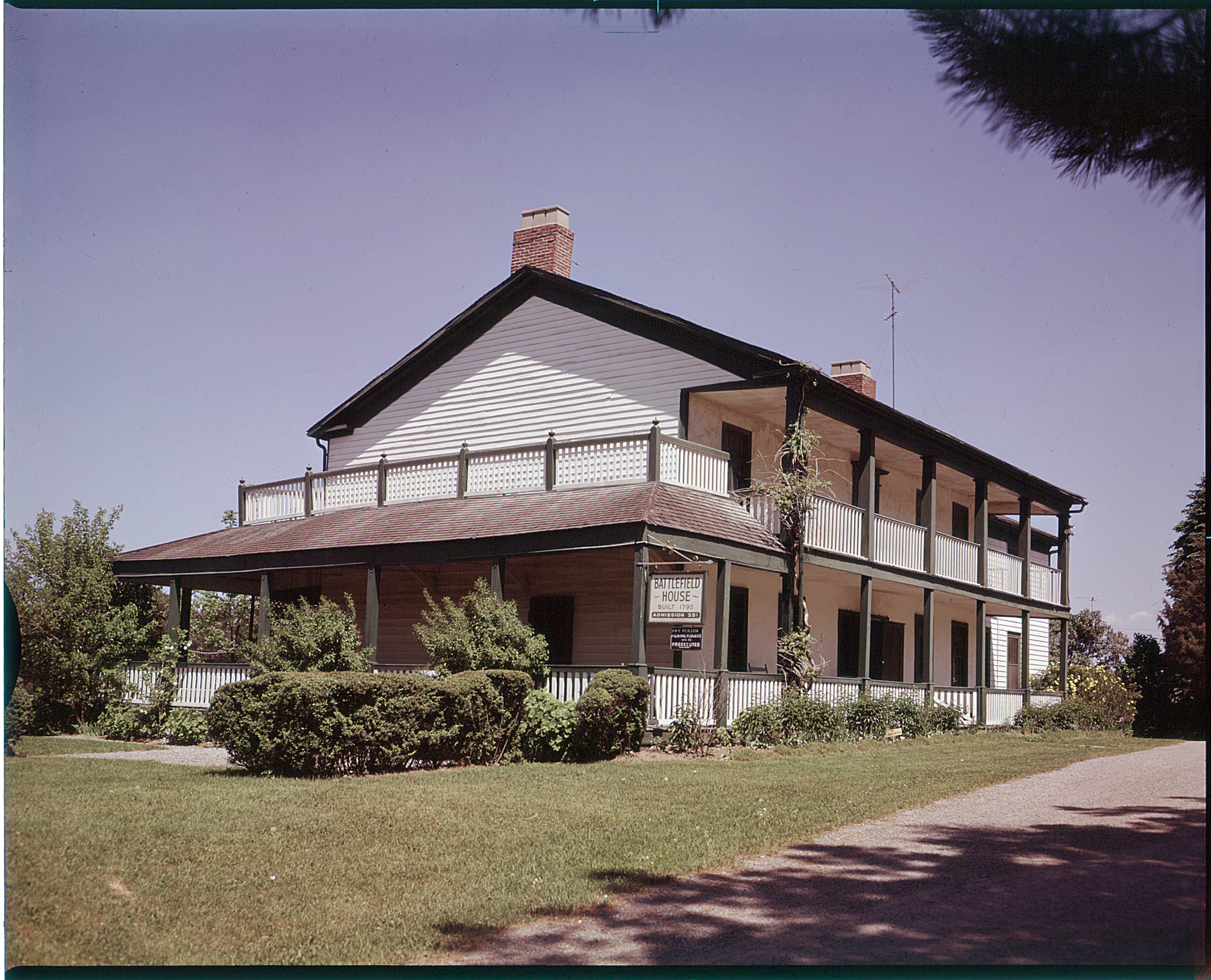
Battlefield House in Stoney Creek, 1959

== See also ==
- List of attractions in Hamilton, Ontario
