= Beach Boulevard (Hamilton, Ontario) =

Street in Canada

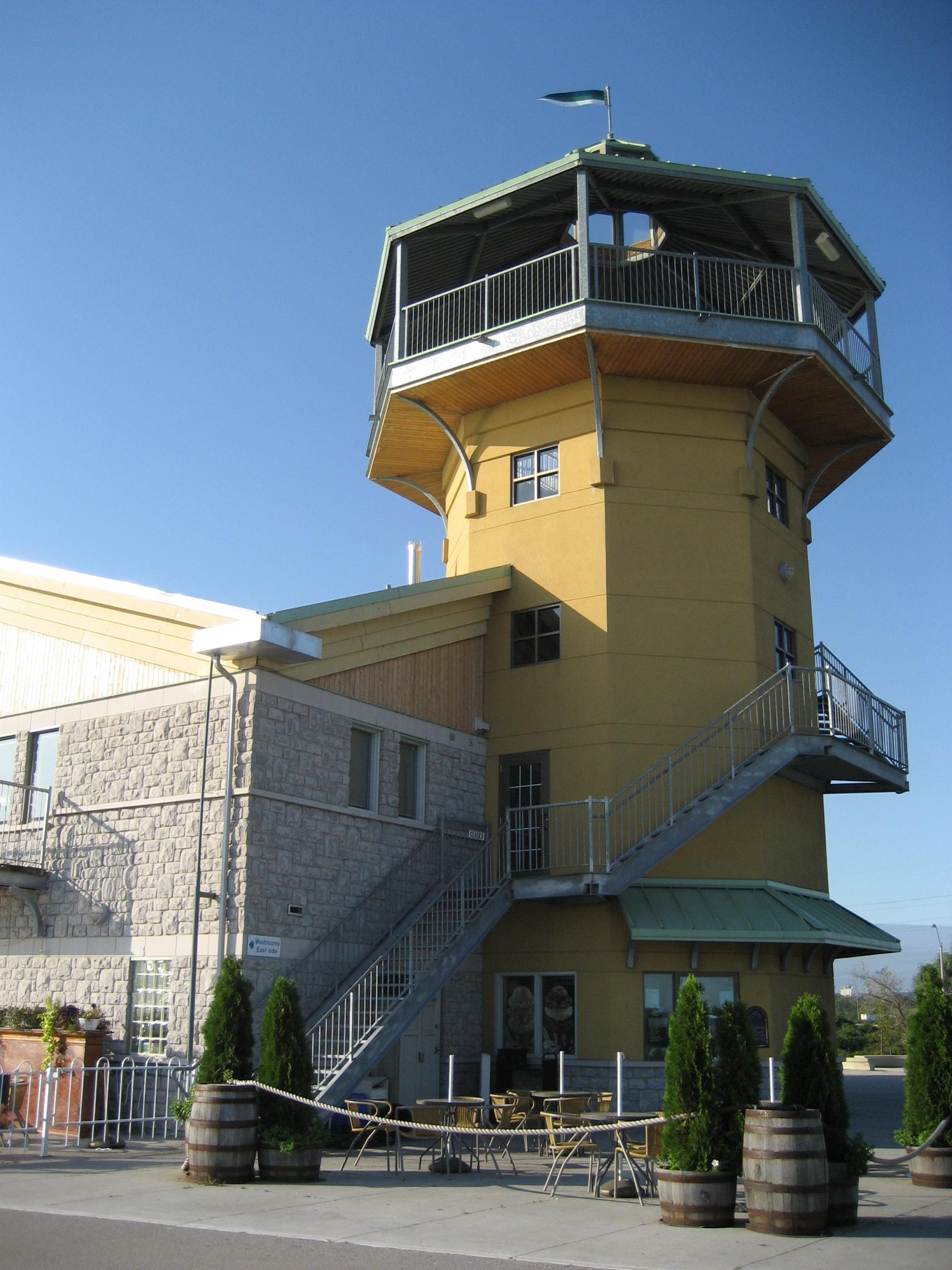
Lakeview by Carmen's, Waterfront Trail

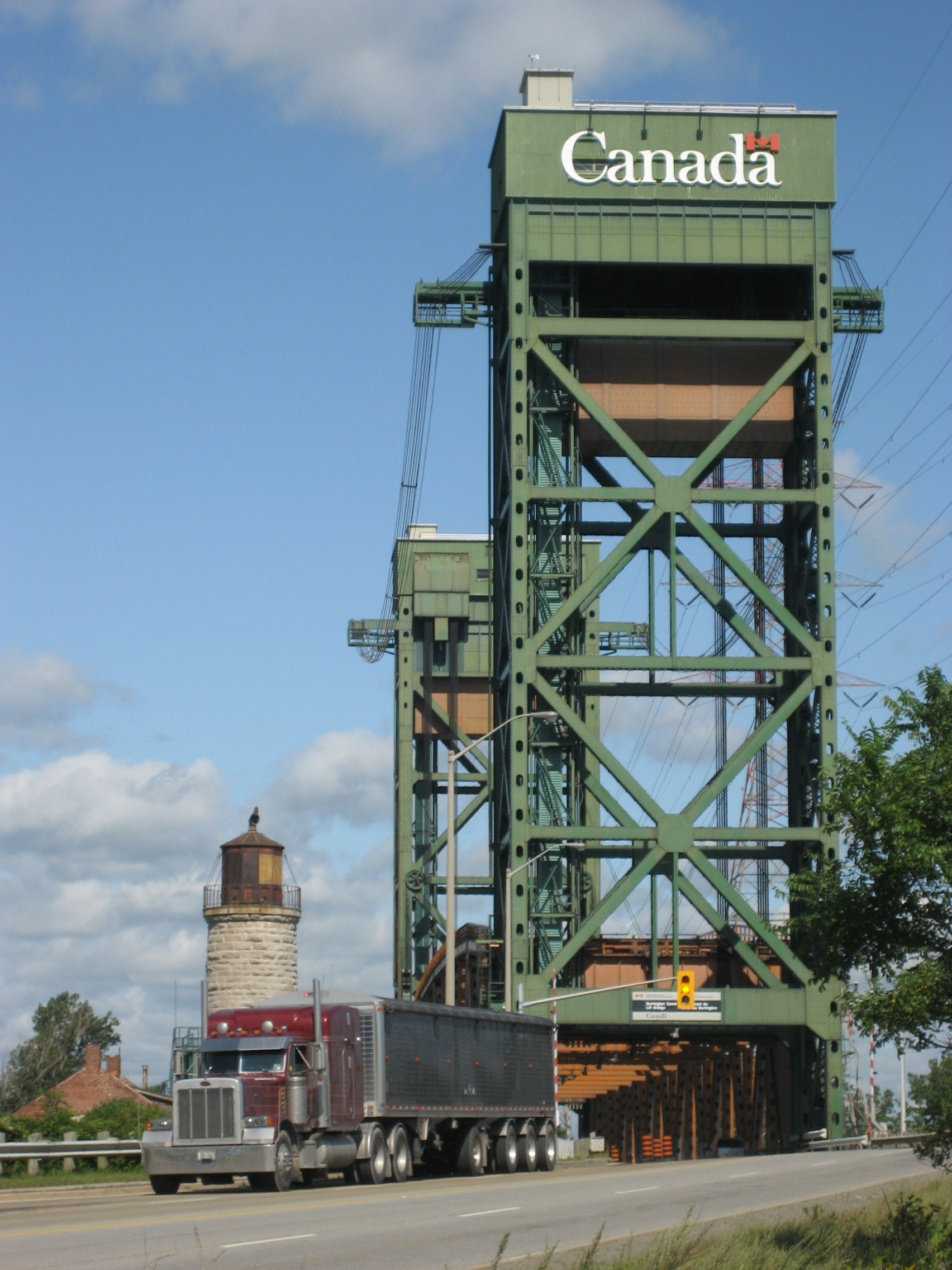
Burlington Canal Lift Bridge

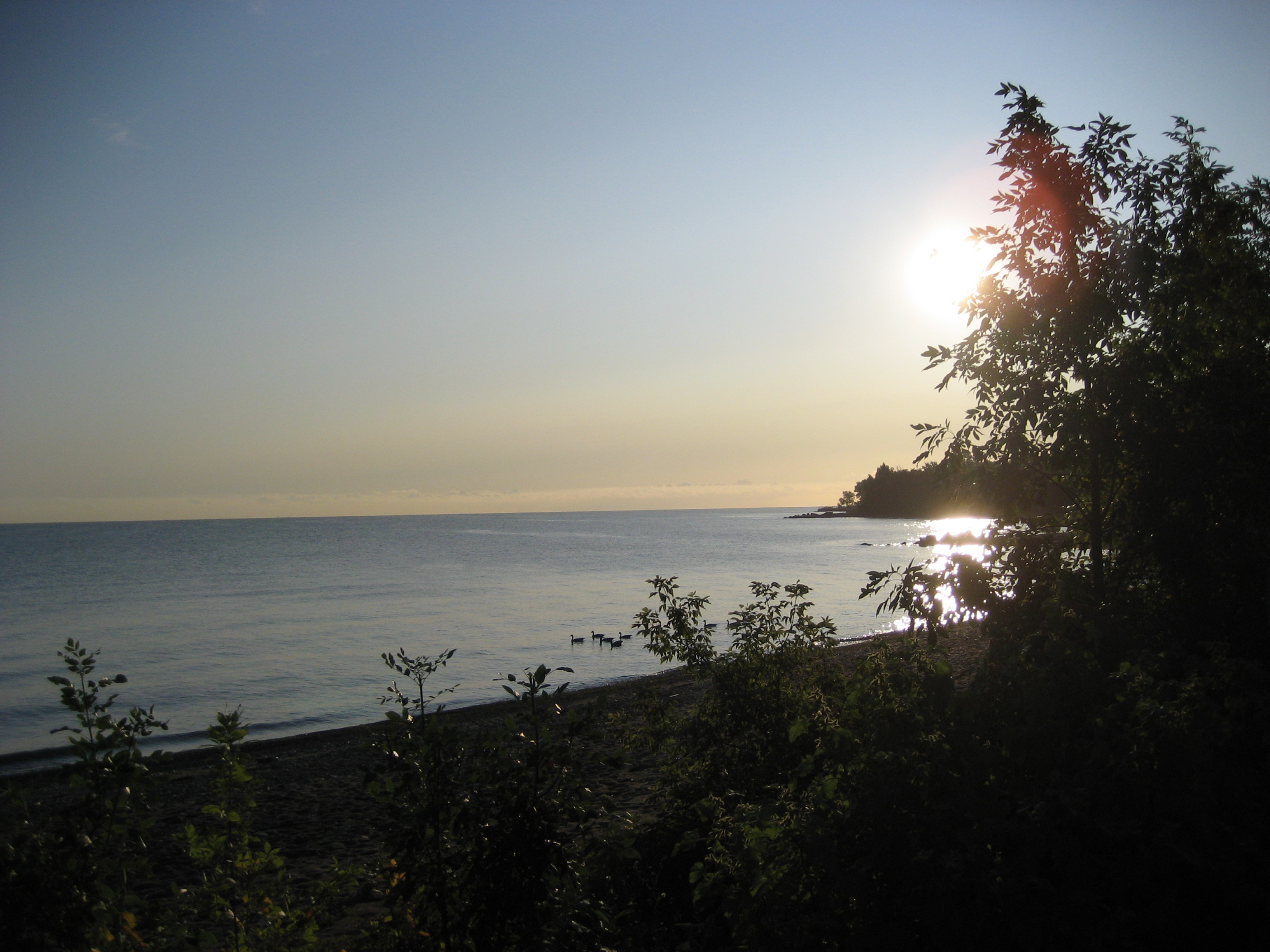
Sunrise, Confederation Park

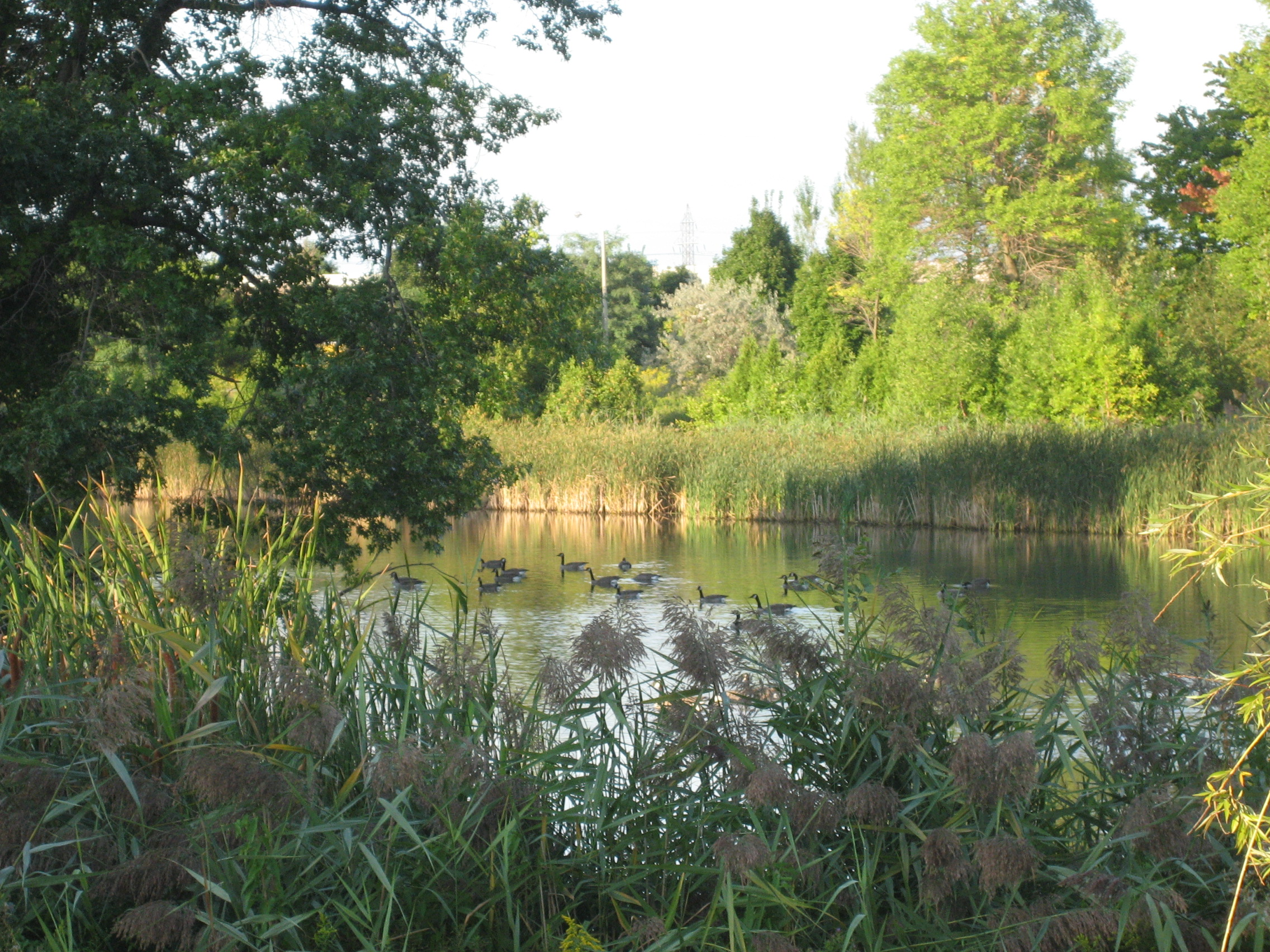
Waterfront Trail near Confederation Park

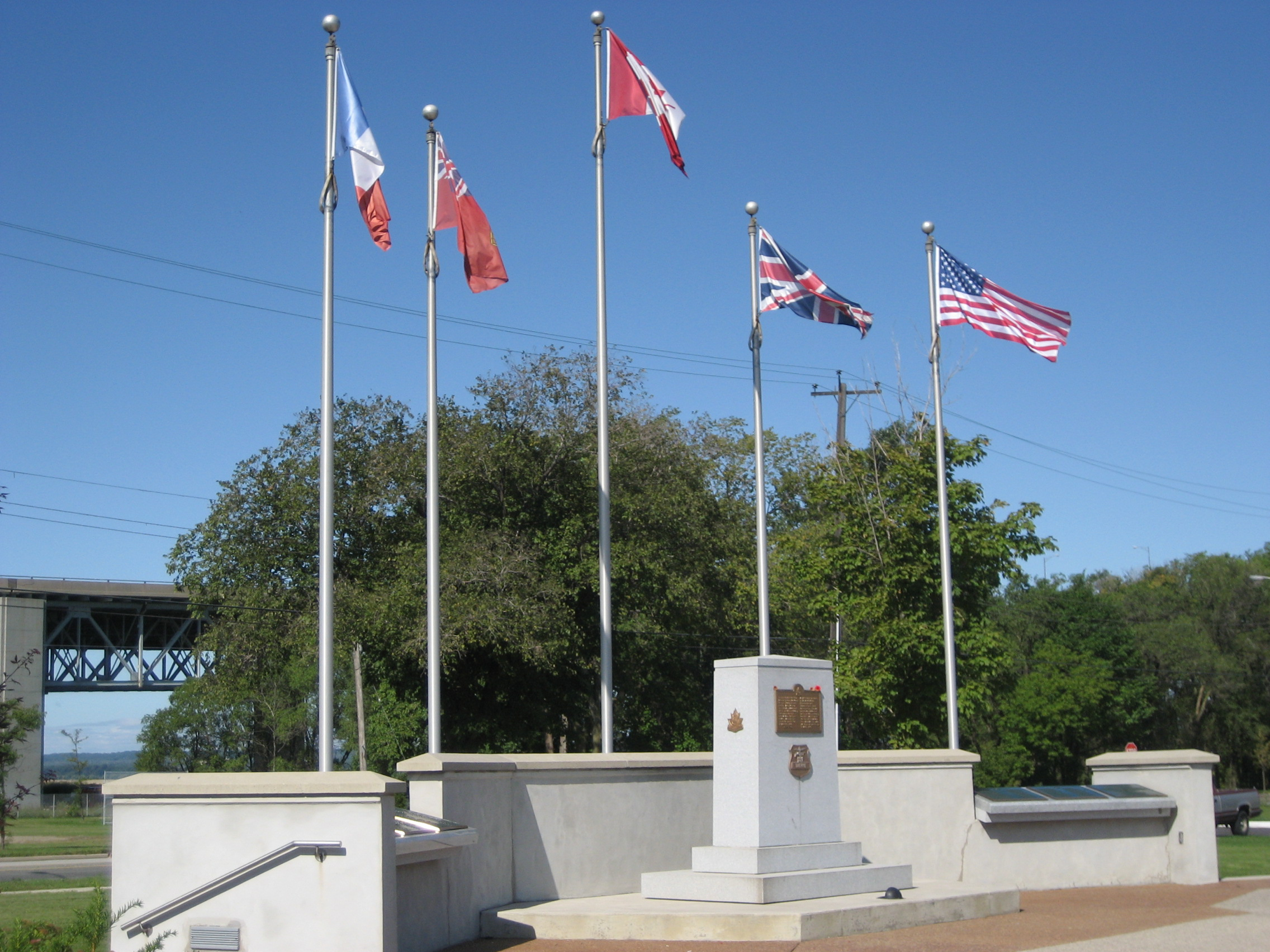
Dieppe Veteran's Memorial Park

Beach Boulevard is a Lower city street in Hamilton, Ontario, Canada, east of the Hamilton Harbour on a thin piece of land that crosses over Lake Ontario and stretches from where Woodward Avenue becomes Eastport Drive in the south to near the Lift Bridge in the north at Eastport Drive (again). It runs parallel with the QEW and the Burlington Bay James N. Allan Skyway Bridge.

== History ==
The first Indigenous peoples to settle in the Hamilton area called the bay Macassa, meaning "beautiful waters". It was not until bridges were built, the marshes drained and a canal cut through the bar that Hamilton started to expand. Before that its chief importance was as a military station, guarding Burlington Heights and the head of the lake.

One of the residences had served as one wing of the old Hamilton fort which had been used in the War of 1812. This building was moved around the time of the First World War by 16 teams of horses – a journey which took 6 weeks. The spot is about eight miles from the city and was reached by Steam or electric street cars or by boat. On May 24, 1877, the first "Beach Train" rolled along the strip, the Hamilton and North-Western Railway. Electrical Radial service began in 1905. After that, the Hamilton and North-Western Railway stopped carrying passengers along the beach strip. But it carried freight until the line was abandoned in 1982.

In 1903 a Mr. H. Knapman formed the Canadian Amusement Company and opened up an amusement park, operating from 1903 to 1978 on Burlington Beach, which today is known as Hamilton Beach. It featured boats, boathouses, swings & slides, snack bars and a fun house named the Crazy House. Shortly thereafter carrousels and a ferris wheel were added and by the 1950s a small roller coaster and pony rides were included in the parks' inventory. A wooden dance floor was installed for the Pier Ballroom with Sunday-evening talent contests with popular artists international performers appearing. In 1978 the City of Hamilton did not renew the Canal Amusement Park lease and the park was closed.

North of Beach Boulevard on Lakeshore Road is an historic lighthouse and the Joseph Brant Museum, a replica of the home of Joseph Brant.

The Beach Strip is a 4-mile, (quarter mile wide), strip that stretches from Spencer Smith Park in Burlington to Confederation Park in Hamilton. This strip of land was known to the aboriginal people in the area as Daonasedao, which translates to "where the sand forms a bar". Thousands of years ago, the beach was formed as a baymouth barrier bar from sand deposited by waves breaking in deep water offshore. As the process continued, a dune gradually developed and eventually a continuous strip of sand was formed, creating an embayment separated from Lake Ontario. Since then, the area has been altered considerably by fill used for construction of the Burlington Bay James N. Allan Skyway, the Queen Elizabeth Way and the Canada Centre for Inland Waters. Hamilton's deep sea port is accessed by ship canal through the beach strip into the harbour and is traversed by two bridges, the QEW's Burlington Bay James N. Allan Skyway and the lower Burlington Canal Lift Bridge.

While the township of Saltfleet and the City of Hamilton helped develop the Beach Strip in the 1800s, the community retained a certain practical independence from both. In 1907, the provincial government recognized its distinctive character by creating a special form of government to address local concerns. For the next 50 years, an appointed Beach Commission established and enforced local by-laws, collected taxes, and supervised the community's own police force. In 1957 the City of Hamilton successfully annexed the Beach Strip, south of the canal, arguing that the city could more efficiently look after the area. In 1964, the City of Burlington took over the administration of the section north of the canal. Beach residents nevertheless retained their strong sense of independence. During the late 1960s and 1970s they organized various groups, such as the Hamilton Beach Preservation Committee, to protect the distinctive interests of their community.

Following a flooding in 1973, the City of Hamilton proposed to assist residents by buying their homes, as part of a long-term plan to tear the houses down and transform the residential area into a lakeside park. While some residents sold their homes, many others refused. They forced Hamilton politicians to revise their long-term plans for the area.

=== Waterfront trail ===
The Trail in Hamilton splits into two sections: The Hamilton Waterfront Trail (west) and the Hamilton Recreation Beach Trail (east). Both trails are largely off-road, 6 metres wide, paved asphalt.

The Hamilton Beach Recreation Trail follows the Lake Ontario shoreline for about 8 kilometres, from Burlington under the Burlington Canal Lift Bridge to the Hamilton Beach and Confederation Park and into Stoney Creek.

== Dieppe Veterans' Memorial Park ==
The Dieppe Veterans' Memorial Park is dedicated by the City of Hamilton to the young men of Hamilton and surrounding communities who died on the stormy beaches of the Port Dieppe, France, on 19 August 1942. A total of 913 Canadian sailors, soldiers and airmen were killed during this raid. The Royal Hamilton Light Infantry (Wentworth Regiment) lost 197 soldiers during this battle. Their names appear here along with other Hamiltonians who died while serving with other Canadian units in Dieppe.

== Skyway Bridge ==
The Burlington Bay James N. Allan Skyway, originally called the Burlington Bay Skyway, is a pair of high-level freeway bridges located in Hamilton and Burlington, Ontario, Canada. The Skyway, as it locally known, is part of the Queen Elizabeth Way (QEW) highway linking Fort Erie with Toronto. The first bridge was completed in 1958 and officially opened 30 October 1958, crossing the narrow bar separating Burlington Bay from Lake Ontario. This allows for Great Lakes ship traffic to flow underneath while four lanes of Golden Horseshoe road traffic may flow on top of it, neither disturbing the other. The bridge was designed by John Turner Bell. The bridge had tolls when constructed, but these were removed 28 December 1973 after they were found to heavily impede traffic flow. Truck drivers in particular had refused to take the tolled bridge since they were not only charged the full toll, but it also took them extra fuel to ascend the Skyway. Several Beach Strip children were killed by tractor trailers, which led to a large group of local women setting up a barricade with baby strollers to put a stop to the tractor trailer traffic being allowed on the beach strip – forcing them to use the skyway bridge. With the lifting of tolls on the bridge, trucks were banned from using Beach Boulevard.

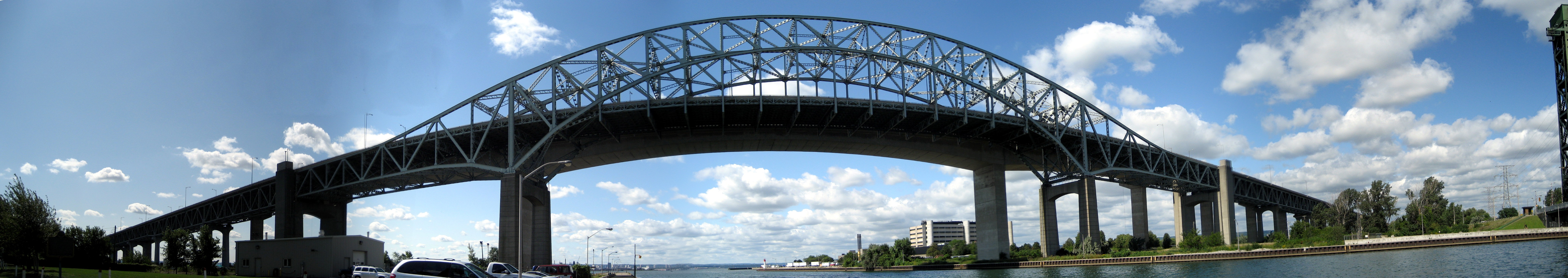
Panoramic view of Burlington Bay James N. Allan Skyway Bridge.

== Landmarks ==
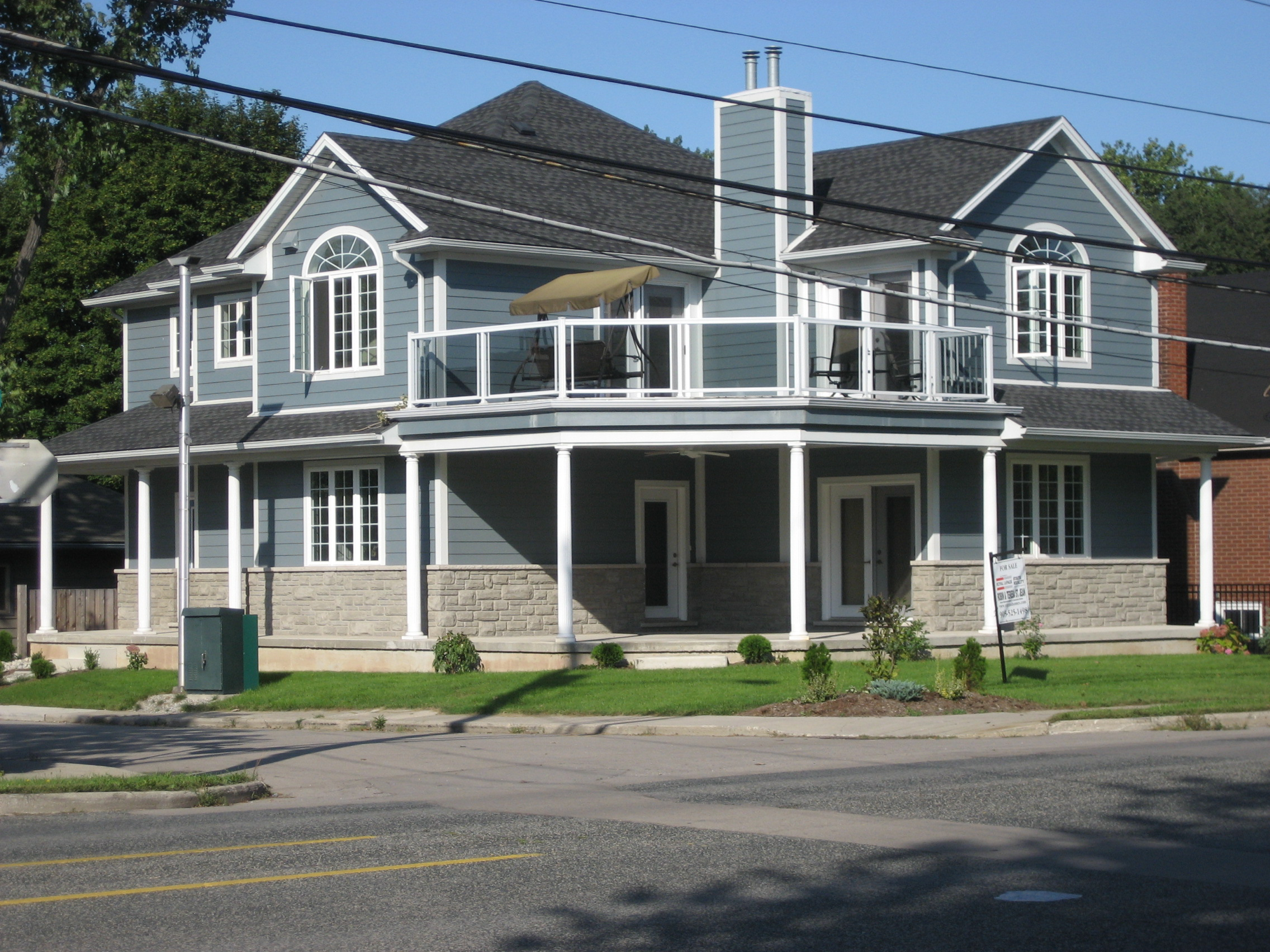
Beach Boulevard

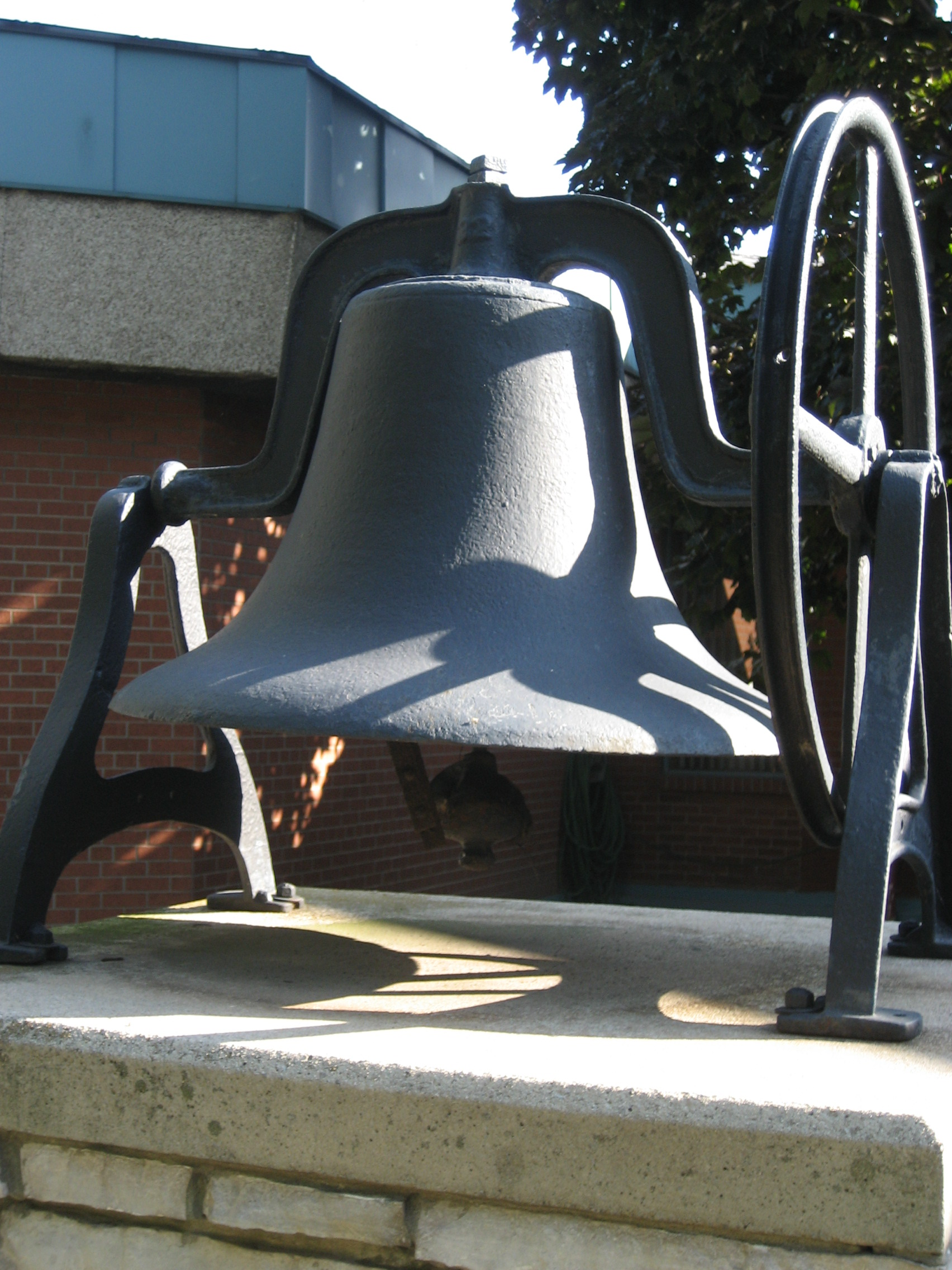
Bell Cairn

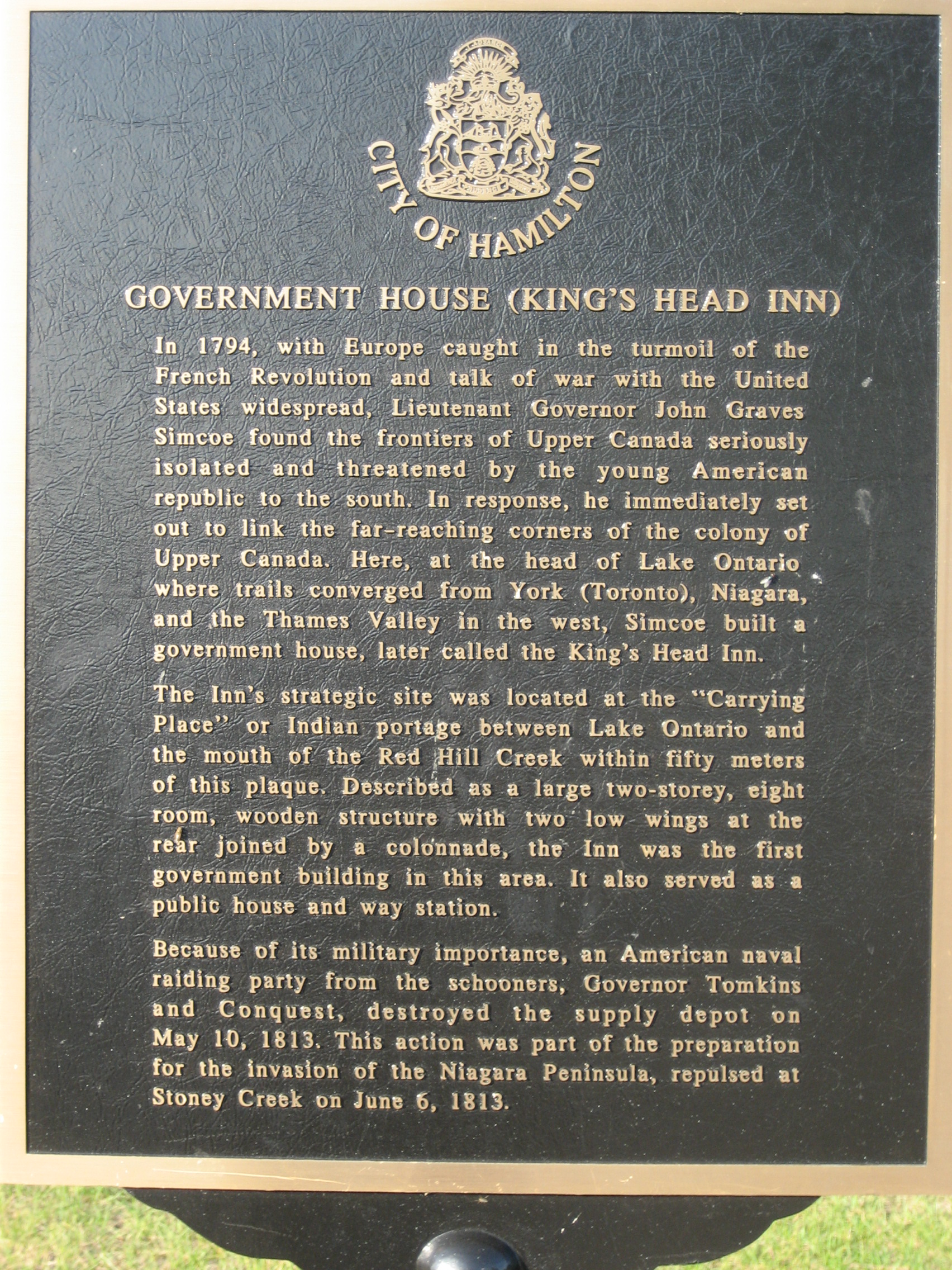
Government House (King's Head Inn)

Note: Listing of Landmarks from West to East.

- Canada Centre for Inland Waters
- Waterfront Trail (runs parallel with Beach Road, north side)
- Burlington Bay James N. Allan Skyway Bridge
- Burlington Bay Canal (completed in 1832)
- Burlington Canal Lift Bridge (Eastport Drive)
- Lighthouse
  - Original site of the Canal Amusement Park
- Sunrise Art Gallery
- Dieppe Veteran's Memorial Park
- Burlington Beach
- Beach Boulevard Park 1
- Ontario Correctional Services College (Bell Cairn Campus)
- Bell Cairn (school bell), original site of the Beach Bungalow & Bell Cairn Schools
- Kinsman Playground (park)
- Beach Motor Inn (motel)
- Branthaven Homes, lakefront townhomes (Old site of Dynes Tavern)
- Skyway Park
- Van Wagner's Beach beside Lakeland Community Centre
- Pebbles on the Beach (statue)
- Lakeview by Carmen's (Wedding & Event Venue)
- Lakeland Go-Karts
- Lakeland Pool
- Beach's Grill & Patio (summertime)
- Hutch's Restaurant
- Baranga's on the Beach (Beach Bar Restaurant)
- Adventure Village
- Confederation Park
  - Wild Waterworks (largest outdoor wave pool in world)
  - Confederation Park campground (seasonal)

== Communities ==
Note: Only one neighbourhood on this thin stretch of land that crosses over Lake Ontario.

- Hamilton Beach

== Images ==
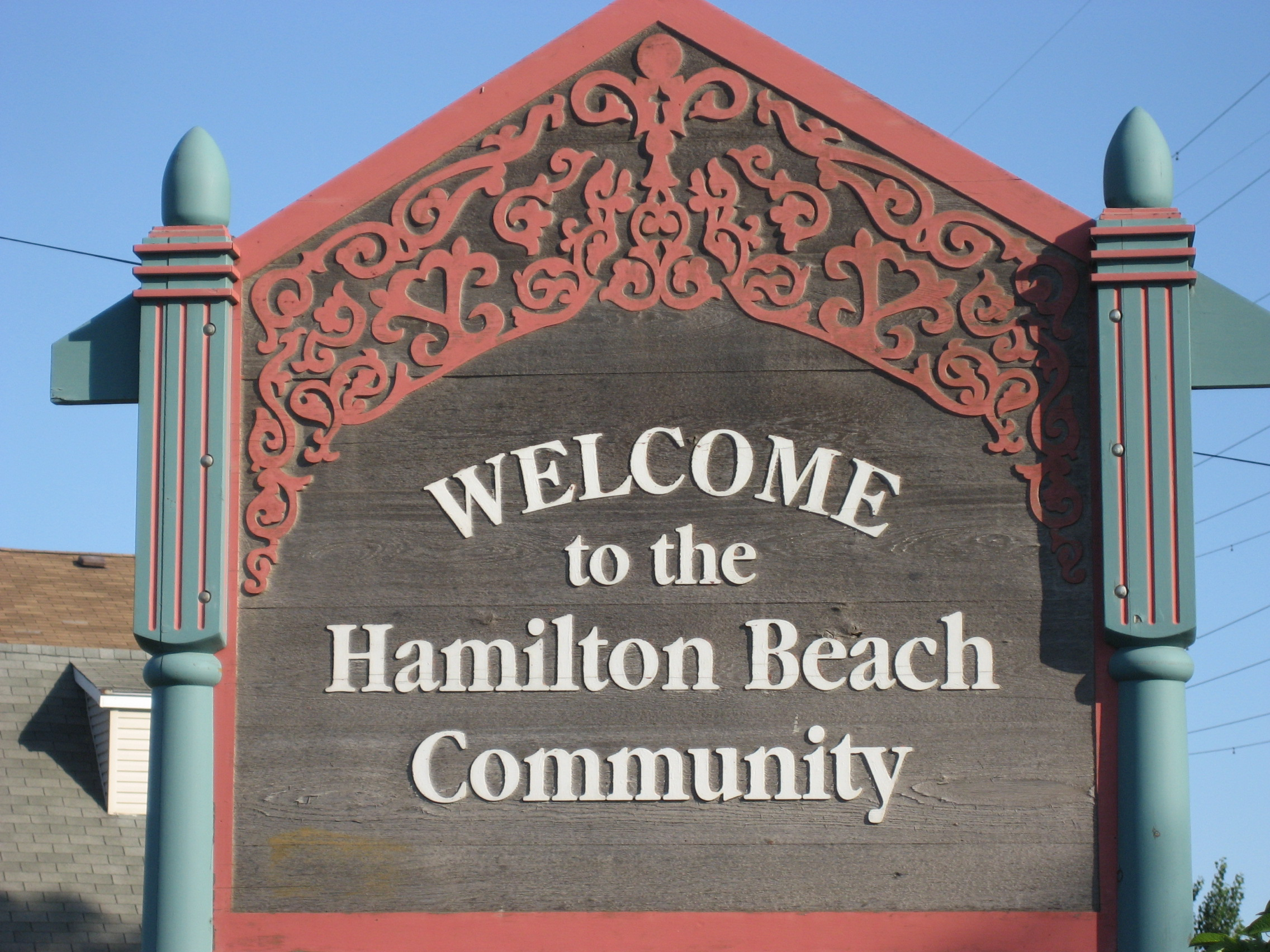

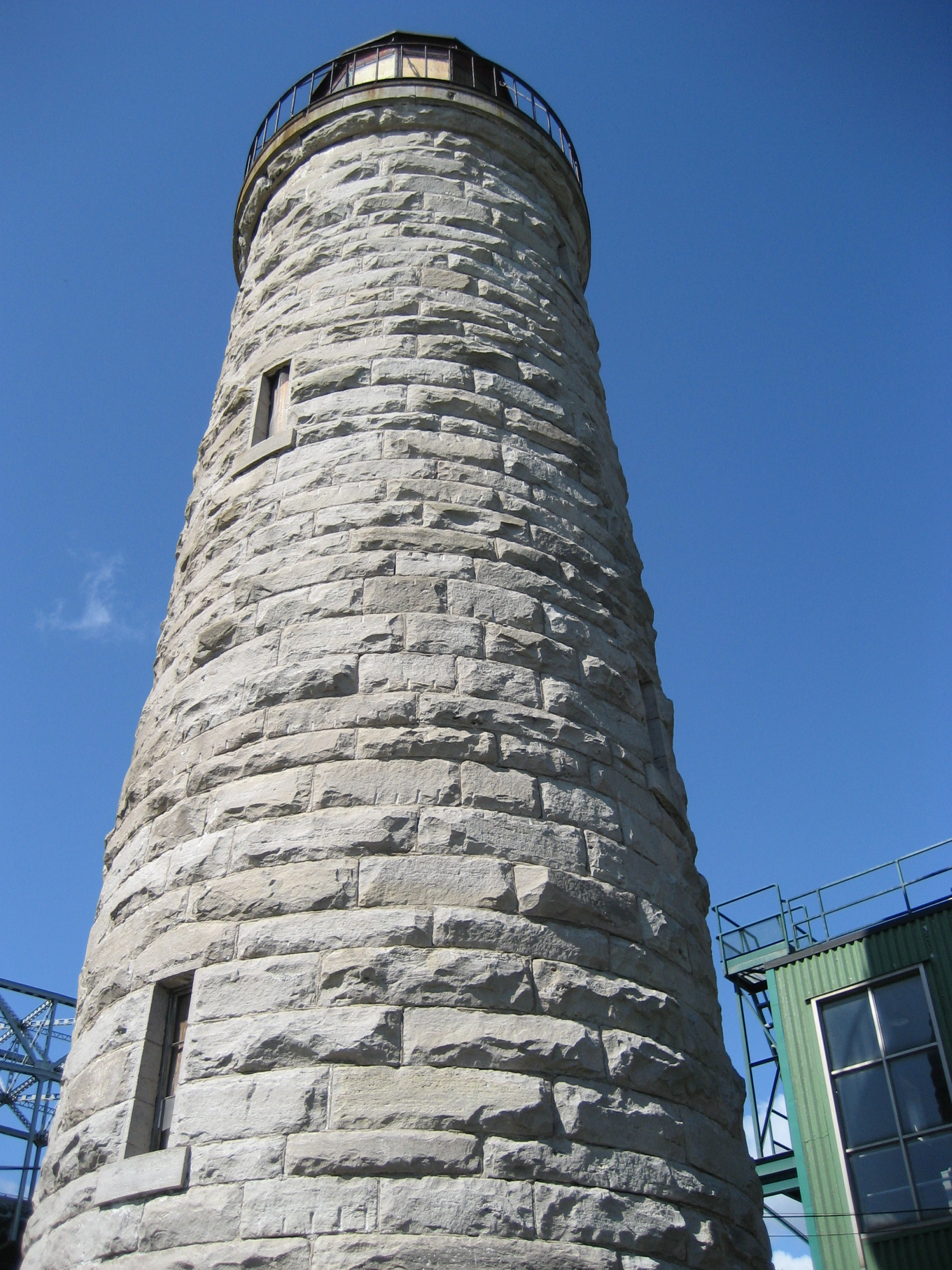
Lighthouse,
Burlington Bay Canal

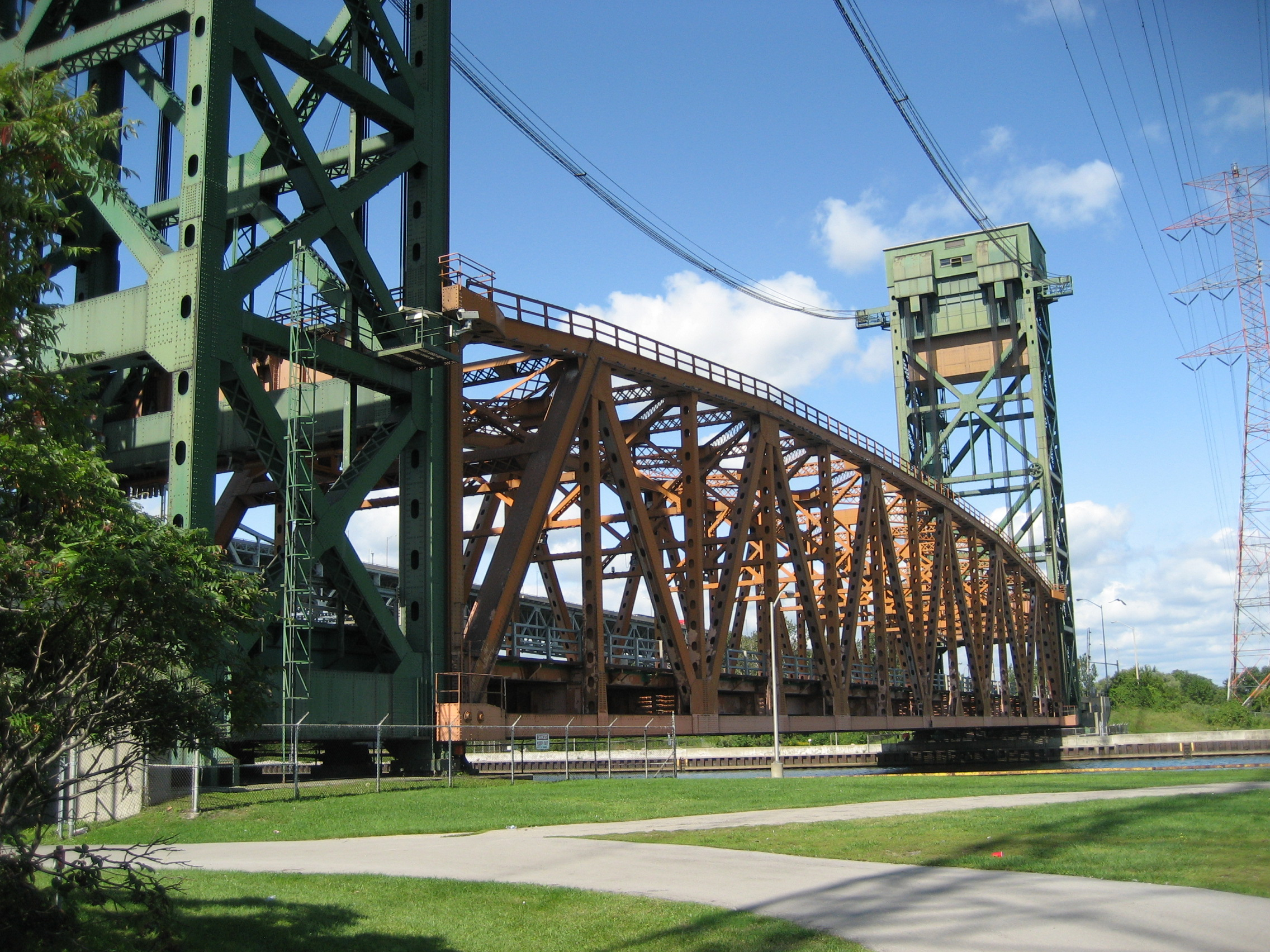
Burlington Canal Lift Bridge

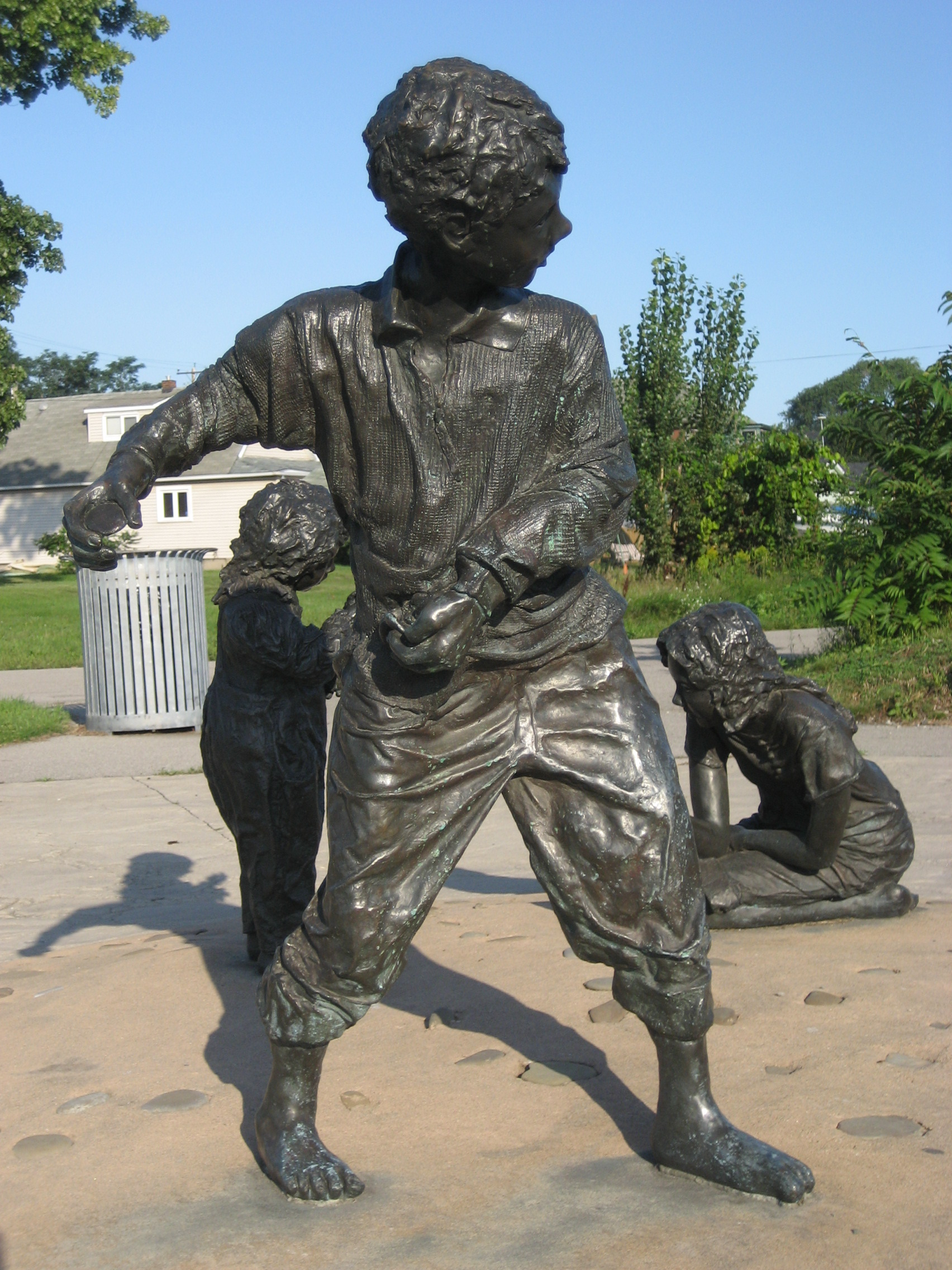
Pebbles on the Beach
(statue)

== See also ==
- Hamilton Conservation Authority
