= Confederation Beach Park =

Park in Hamilton, Ontario, Canada

Coordinates: 43.26251°N 79.7691°W

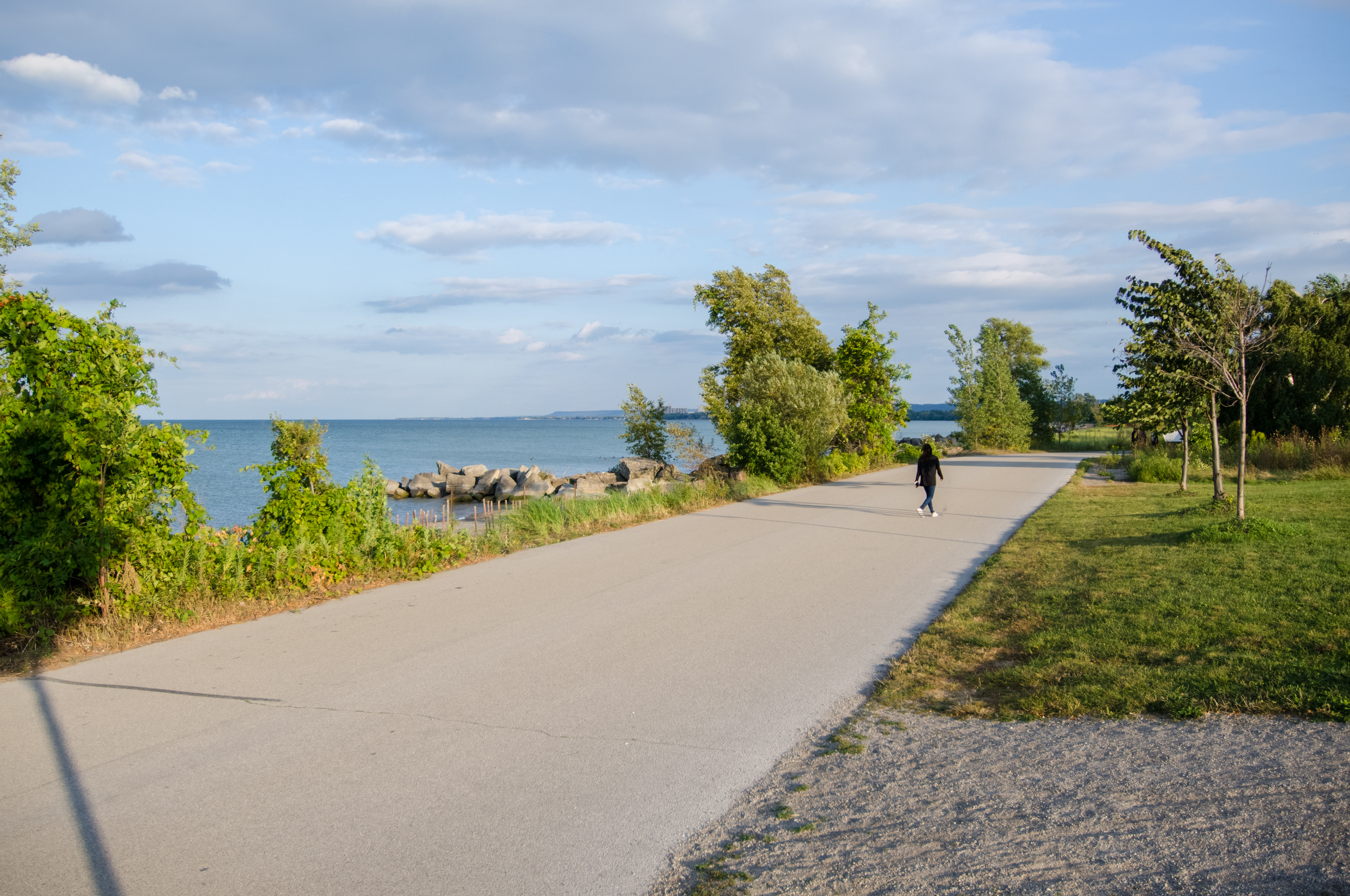
Confederation Park

Confederation Beach Park (known as Confederation Park until 2016) is a Tourist Area/Park in Hamilton, Ontario. The park includes: Wild Waterworks, an outdoor waterpark; Adventure Village, an amusement centre with laser tag, bumper cars and an 18-hole mini golf course; and a fast food diner restaurant with a 1950s motif called Hutch's. There is also a restaurant/entertainment centre called Barangas on the Beach. There is an observation tower, a beachfront restaurant, a swimming pool, a beach and a trail, and a go-kart track. The city maintains a pickleball court at the east end of the park. There was a full-sized amusement park until 1978. It is also the namesake for the nearby GO train station, Confederation GO Station.
