= Ontario Highway 58A =

Ontario provincial highway

Highway 58A
- Niagara Regional Road 525
- Highway 58A highlighted in red

Route information
- Maintained by the Ministry of Transportation of Ontario
- Length: 5.1 km (3.2 mi)
- Existed: 1978–present

Major junctions
- West end: Highway 58
- East end: Highway 140

Location
- Country: Canada
- Province: Ontario

Highway system
- Ontario provincial highways; Current; Former; 400-series
← Highway 58	→ Highway 60
Former provincial highways
Highway 59 →

King's Highway 58A, commonly referred to as Highway 58A, is a provincially maintained highway in the Canadian province of Ontario. The short route serves to connect Highway 58 with Highway 140 and passes beneath the Welland Canal through the Townline Tunnel. The entire route is located within the city of Welland in the Regional Municipality of Niagara.

The route was established by 1978, following completion of the Welland By-Pass project, and has remained unchanged since then.

== Route description ==
Eastern end of Highway 58A

Highway 58A passes through the Townline Tunnel, one of the three tunnels under the Welland Canal. The majority of the route follows Townline Road, although a short section at the eastern end travels along Reaker Road and Netherby Road. Beginning at the northern terminus of the southern section of Highway 58, the highway travels east, parallel with two railway lines. The road intersects Canal Bank Road (north) / The Kingsway (south) after crossing an earth plug on the old Welland Canal, now the Welland Recreational Waterway. It then curves slightly southwards and begins descending towards the Townline Tunnel. It encounters Humberstone Road and then passes beneath a railway prior to entering the tunnel. At the eastern end of the tunnel, the route encounters Rusholme Road before passing beneath Highway 140. It turns north onto Reaker Road and then west onto Netherby Road to end at an at-grade intersection with Highway 140.

== History ==
Highway 58A was established during the 1970s following completion of the Welland By-Pass project of the Welland Canal and Highway 140. Initially envisioned as the southern terminus for Highway 406, the planned route first appeared on the Official Ontario Road Map in 1971, though it had been proposed since the release of Niagara Peninsula Planning Study in 1964.

Planning for the Townline Tunnel began immediately following the announcement of the planned Welland Bypass by the St. Lawrence Seaway Authority in 1965. It was opened to automobile traffic on July 13, 1972. Despite this, the Highway 58 designation did not appear on an official road map until 1978. The route has remained unchanged since then.

== Future ==
Route planning documents show two proposals that may utilize the Highway 58A corridor: a southern extension of Highway 406 and the eastern portion of the Mid-Peninsula Highway, referred to as the Niagara South Highway in planning documents. Neither proposal has garnered approval or undergone environmental assessment at this time.

== Major intersections ==
The following table lists the major junctions along Highway 58A, as noted by the Ministry of Transportation of Ontario. The entire route is located in Welland, within the Regional Municipality of Niagara.

km	mi	Destinations	Notes
0.0	0.0	Regional Road 33 west (Humberstone Road) Highway 58 south (West Side Road) – Port Colborne; Regional Road 54 north (Prince Charles Drive)	Highway 58A western terminus
0.8	0.50	Canal Bank Street	Formerly Regional Road 68
2.6– 2.9	1.6– 1.8	Townline Tunnel under the Welland Canal	
4.7	2.9	Regional Road 525 east (Townline Tunnel Road)	
5.1	3.2	Highway 140 – Port Colborne, St. Catharines	Highway 58A eastern terminus
1.000 mi = 1.609 km; 1.000 km = 0.621 mi
