= Cooks Mills, Welland =

Cooks Mills
- Unincorporated community
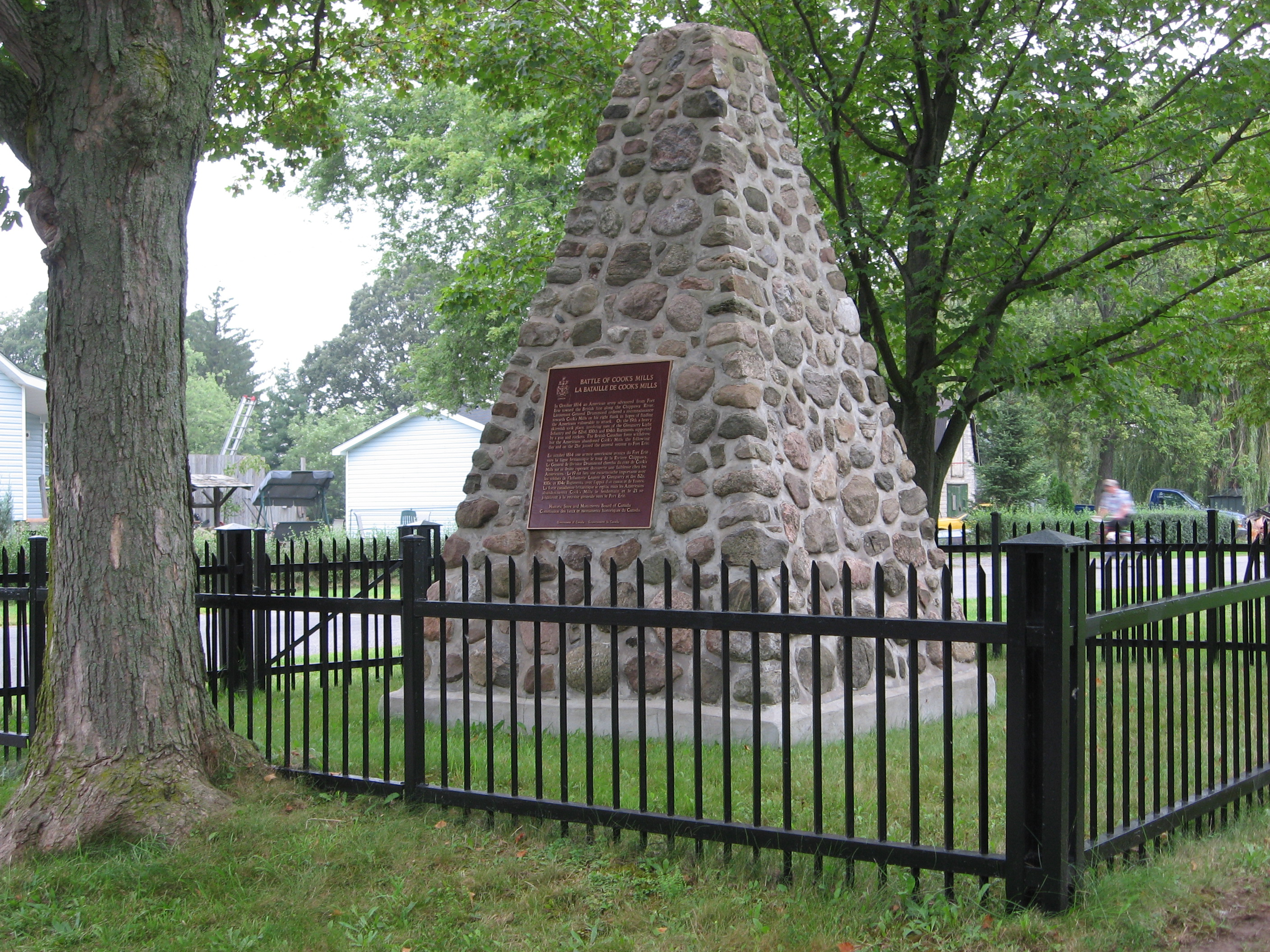
- The monument commemorating the Battle of Cook's Mills.
- Interactive map of Cooks Mills
- Coordinates: 42°59′47″N 79°10′44″W
- Country: Canada
- Province: Ontario
- Regional municipality: Niagara
- City: Welland
- Settled: 1799
- Time zone: UTC-5 (EST)
  - Summer (DST): UTC-4 (EDT)
- Forward sortation area: L??
- Area codes: 905 and 289
- NTS Map: 030L14
- GNBC Code: FASVS

Cooks Mills is a small community in the easternmost part of the city of Welland in Ontario, Canada. It was established, and is still centred, on a Welland River tributary called Lyons Creek. It is almost entirely a bedroom community, as there are few employers located in the area.

== History ==
The community predates the establishment of what is now downtown Welland by half a century. In 1799 the Yokom family came from Pennsylvania and built a grist mill on Lyon's Creek in Crowland Township. Just before the War of 1812, Calvin Cook purchased the mill and, together with his brother Noah, eventually adding a tannery, a sawmill and a distillery. The place known as Cooks Mills became a prominent community in the township.

Toward the end of the War of 1812, a fire fight occurred at Cooks Mills, involving an American contingent sent to destroy flour and grain that might benefit the British. On the morning of October 19, 1814, the American picket just east of the mills was attacked by soldiers of the Glengarry Light Infantry and other British regiments. The British force was supported by a 6-pound field cannon and Congreve rockets. Though suffering heavy casualties, the Americans succeeded in driving off the British. Before leaving the hamlet the Americans destroyed what grain they found in the mill.

The remains of American and British soldiers killed in the battle lie buried in unmarked graves near the creek.

Lyon's Creek headwaters were in the Wainfleet marsh. However, they were cut off by the construction of the Feeder Canal for the Welland Canal. The creek was carried under the canal through a stone culvert. Due to the construction, the water level in the marsh slowly receded. All the while, the culvert was being clogged up by debris. Eventually, the flow in Lyons Creek decreased to the extent when it was no longer able to turn the water wheels at Cooks Mills. The industries were closed and abandoned. Thus, the canal, which contributed greatly to development of Welland, became an indirect cause of an economic recession for Cooks Mills. Later on, Welland beat neighbouring communities in the running for the county seat. Cooks Mills became a farming area as opposed to Welland's industrial centre.

Over time, the apostrophes indicating the possessive in Lyon's Creek and Cook's Mills were dropped following a trend in the region exemplified by St. Catharines and St. Johns West.

On January 1, 1961, the Crowland Township, including Cooks Mills, was incorporated into the City of Welland.

By the time of construction of the Welland By-Pass in 1967-1973, the original headwaters in the Wainfleet Marsh have all but disappeared, and most of what flow there was in the creek was coming from an earlier tributary called Indian Creek by some maps. This made Lyons Creek somewhat U-shaped, as Indian Creek flowed west before joining the original Lyons Creek. During the By-Pass construction, the creek was cut into three parts, and now what was once Indian Creek flows into the canal (photo). A couple kilometres north, Lyons Creek is fed directly from the canal (photo). The middle part of the creek dried up and much of its bed was torn up during the construction of approaches to the Townline Tunnel.

In a recent development, a study on the pollutants in the Niagara River done in 2000 found the organic pollutants polychlorinated biphenyls (PCBs) to be present in the Lyons Creek. The Ontario Ministry of the Environment is investigating the source of PCBs and possible remedial actions to deal with contaminated sediment.

== Geography ==
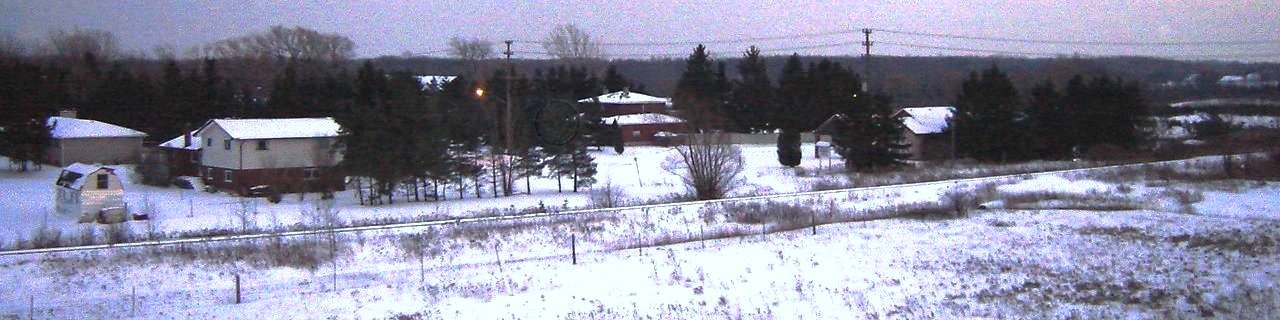
A typical Cooks Mills landscape in the winter.

The Welland By-Pass channel separates Cooks Mills from the main urbanized area of City of Welland. The most direct ways of crossing the channel are the Main Street and Townline Tunnels.

Built-up areas in Cooks Mills are located close to the roads; the rest of the area consists mainly of wooded lots and fields. The Niagara Road 27, commonly known as Schisler Road, linking Welland and Niagara Falls, runs to the north of the centre of the community, and Highway 140 runs to the west, while Montrose Road runs to the east, and Netherby Road runs to the south.

The main area of Welland is located to the west. To the east is Niagara Falls, to the north is Thorold, and to the south is Port Colborne.
