= Ontario Highway 58 =

Ontario provincial highway

Highway 58

Route information
- Maintained by the Ministry of Transportation of Ontario
- Length: 15.5 km (9.6 mi)
- Existed: September 4, 1935–present

Southern segment
- Length: 7.2 km (4.5 mi)
- South end: Highway 3 in Port Colborne
- North end: Highway 58A in Welland

Northern segment
- Length: 8.3 km (5.2 mi)
- South end: Highway 20 near Allanburg
- North end: Highway 406 in Thorold

Location
- Country: Canada
- Province: Ontario

Highway system
- Ontario provincial highways; Current; Former; 400-series
← Highway 49	→ Highway 58A
Former provincial highways
← Highway 57

King's Highway 58, commonly referred to as Highway 58, is a provincially maintained highway in the Canadian province of Ontario. The route is divided into two segments with a combined length of 15.5 km (9.6 mi). The southern segment travels from Niagara Regional Road 3, formerly Highway 3, in Port Colborne, to the Highway 58A junction in the southern end of Welland, a distance of 7.2 km (4.5 mi). The northern segment begins at Highway 20 near Allanburg and travels north and west to a large junction with Highway 406 at the St. Catharines – Thorold boundary, a distance of 8.3 km (5.2 mi). An 18.1 km (11.2 mi) gap separates the two segments within Welland and Pelham. The entire route is located within the Regional Municipality of Niagara.

The history of Highway 58 is tumultuous due to various relocation projects resulting from the construction of the fourth Welland Canal and Highway 406. Prior to 1997, Highway 58 was continuous and travelled through the west side of Welland, maintained under a Connecting Link agreement. The route was first established in 1935, though it remained unnumbered on the 1935 and 1936 official road maps. By 1937 it extended from Port Colborne to St. Catharines, though the route it travelled between those places shifted several times over the following 30 years. In the late 1990s, the Ministry of Transportation of Ontario (MTO) transferred several highways or portions of highways throughout the province to lower levels of government. Highway 58 was decommissioned through Welland on April 1, 1997.

== Route description ==
The segment between Highway 406 in Thorold and Niagara Road 57 east of Thorold is a four-lane freeway. It also contains the Thorold Tunnel, one of the three tunnels under the Welland Canal. The remaining segments vary between a two-lane rural highway and four-lane urban roadway. Overall, the highway is 15.5 km (9.6 mi) in length, with a 18.1-kilometre (11.2 mi) gap separating the two sections.

The southern section of Highway 58 begins at a junction with the former Highway 3 in the city of Port Colborne, several kilometres north of Lake Erie. South of this intersection, the road once continued as Niagara Regional Road 64 to Killaly Street; such has since been downloaded to the city of Port Colborne. Proceeding north, the highway, known locally as West Side Road, passes through the suburbs of Port Colborne, north of which it skirts the eastern edge of the Wainfleet Bog, one of the few remaining habitats of the Massasauga Rattlesnake. West of Dain City, Highway 58 crosses the Port Colborne – Welland boundary at Forks Road, a grade-separated intersection. The route crosses several rail lines on a bridge south of its terminus at Highway 58A (Humberstone Road) at the southern edge of the built up area of Welland. North of there, it continues as Niagara Regional Road 54 (Prince Charles Drive)

Highway 58 facing south from Highway 58A (Townline Road) towards Forks Road and Port Colborne

The northern section of Highway 58 begins at an intersection with the western terminus of Highway 20, approximately 3.5 kilometres (2.2 mi) east of Highway 406, within Thorold. South of this intersection, the road that carries Highway 58 continues as Niagara Regional Road 82, whereas west of the intersection the road that carries Highway 20, Lundy's Lane, continues as Niagara Regional Road 58 through Allanburg. Highway 58 proceeds north, at first along an established concession road, before branching to the east on its own alignment known as Davis Road. The route crosses several flooded valleys that form part of the Welland Canal before arriving at Thorold Stone Road, at which point Highway 58 turns west and enters the Thorold Tunnel, descending beneath the canal.

At the western end of the tunnel, Highway 58 emerges as a divided highway in Thorold. It meets an interchange with Pine Street; the eastbound on-ramp from Pine Street features a stop sign and no merging lane prior to entering the Thorold Tunnel. West of Pine Street, the route passes beneath a Trillium Railway line and curves slightly southwest. It encounters an interchange with Collier Street, gradually curving to the northwest and passing beneath Richmond Street. Highway 58 ends at a complicated interchange with both St. Davids Road as well as Highway 406 on the edge of the Niagara Escarpment.

== History ==
The first portion of what became Highway 58 was assumed on September 4, 1935. Although only a short stub travelling south from Main Street in Welland (then Highway 3A), it connected to a road owned by the Welland Canal Authority (WCA) travelling along the east side of the old canal, now known by various names including Barber Drive, Canal Road, Kingsway, and Canal Bank Street. Initially unnumbered, the route was extended to Port Colborne and St. Catharines on October 6, 1937, and by then had been given the designation of Highway 58. It now began at Highway 3 in Port Colborne and travelled to Welland along the east side of the canal, and thereafter north along Niagara Street, the Merrittville Highway and Glenridge Road (Niagara Regional Road 50) to Highway 8 in downtown St. Catharines.

On July 17 and 30, 1958, the Department of Highways assumed the West Side Road, constructed in the years prior by Welland County between Port Colborne and Welland. The old highway was turned back to the WCA on June 26 and September 4 of that same year. Highway 58 then entered Welland along what is now Prince Charles Drive, meeting and becoming concurrent with Highway 3A at Riverside Drive / Lincoln Street and then turning east along East Main Street. By 1960, the Welland Bypass was completed along the routing of the former Niagara, St. Catharines and Toronto Railway interurban line – the final operating interurban railway in Canada, which ceased operations on the line on March 28, 1959. This rerouted the highway along what is now Prince Charles Drive northwest to Thorold Road, where it turned east to Niagara Street.

North of Welland, Highway 58 initially travelled concurrent with Highway 3A along Niagara Street and the Merrittville Highway to Highway 20, where Highway 3A ended. Highway 58 turned east and travelled concurrent with Highway 20 across the Welland Canal at Allanburg, before turning north onto the current route. However, it continued north along Allanburg Road into Thorold, where it crossed the Welland Canal on a swing bridge and travelled north into St. Catharines along Ormond Street, Merritt Street and Hartzel Road (Niagara Regional Road 52) to Highway 8 (Queenston Street, now Niagara Regional Road 81).

=== Effect of the Thorold Tunnel and Highway 406 ===
The routing of Highway 58 was eventually upheaved by two major changes within the Niagara Peninsula. The first was the construction of the Thorold Tunnel, which was built as part of the larger Welland Bypass project of the Welland Canal in order to minimize road and rail crossings that plagued the length of the canal prior to the 1970s. The Thorold Tunnel was designed to carry a divided four lane road beneath the canal, bypassing the bridge between Allanburg Road and Ormond Street. It was built during the winter months between 1965 and 1967, with the canal drained, and opened on September 18, 1968. Following its completion, Highway 58 was rerouted through the tunnel, west of which it forked. At the Pine Road interchange, one fork travelled north on Pine, east along Richmond Street and north along Ormond Street (now Niagara Regional Road 52). The other fork followed the present route. As part of the creation of the Regional Municipality of Niagara, Highway 8 was transferred to the newly formed region as well as the original alignment of Highway 58.

The second change was the initial construction of Highway 406 in the mid-1960s, establishing a new northern terminus for Highway 58 at the St. Davids Road interchange on the Niagara Escarpment. The St. Davids Road interchange was fully opened with the Highway 406 extension to Beaverdams Road on November 21, 1969. Eventually Highway 406 would reroute the section of Highway 58 along the Merrittville Highway between Welland and Highway 20 to instead turn east from Niagara Street along Merritt Road, where it curved north to become the two-laned Highway 406. This happened when Highway 406 was extended south from Beaverdams Road to Merritt Road on June 30, 1971.

=== Downloading ===
Budget constraints brought on by a recession in the 1990s resulted in the Mike Harris provincial government forming the Who Does What? committee in 1995 to determine cost-cutting measures in order to balance the budget after a deficit incurred by former premier Bob Rae. It was determined that many Ontario highways no longer serve long-distance traffic movement and should therefore be maintained by local or regional levels of government. The MTO consequently transferred many highways to lower levels of government in 1997 and 1998 (downloading), removing a significant percentage of the provincial highway network. As Highway 58 had largely been replaced by Highway 406, the central segment through Welland and Pelham was deemed to no longer serve long-distance traffic, and was downloaded to the Regional Municipality of Niagara on April 1, 1997. It now exists as Regional Road 54 along Prince Charles Drive and Regional Road 50 along Niagara Street and the Merrittville Highway.

No part of Highway 58 today follows the original 1935 route along the Welland Canal. Only a 6.7-kilometre (4.2 mi) section of the 1937 routing, north from Highway 20 (Lundy's Lane) is still used by the route now.

== Major intersections ==
The following table lists the major junctions along Highway 58, as noted by the Ministry of Transportation of Ontario. The entire route is located in the Regional Municipality of Niagara.

Location	km	mi	Destinations	Notes
Port Colborne	0.0	0.0	Regional Road 3 – Fort Erie	Formerly Highway 3; Highway 58 southern terminus
Welland	5.5	3.4	Regional Road 23 (Forks Road) – Dain City	
Welland	7.2	4.5	Highway 58A east (Townline Tunnel Road) to Highway 140; Regional Road 33 west (Humberstone Road) Regional Road 54 begins (Prince Charles Drive)	End of southern section
18.1 km (11.2 mi) gap in Highway 58
Thorold	25.3	15.7	Highway 20 east – Niagara Falls; Regional Road 20 west – Fonthill, Hamilton Regional Road 82 south (Allanport Road)	Beginning of northern section
Thorold	28.6	17.8	Regional Road 53 (Beaverdams Road)	
Thorold	29.6	18.4	Regional Road 57 east (Thorold Stone Road) – Niagara Falls Davis Road	Unsigned designation Highway 7186
Thorold	30.0– 30.8	18.6– 19.1	Thorold Tunnel under the Welland Canal	
Thorold	31.0	19.3	Regional Road 67 (Pine Street)	Interchange
Thorold	32.1	19.9	Regional Road 56 (Collier Street)	Interchange
Thorold	33.6	20.9	Highway 406 – St. Catharines Regional Road 71 (St. Davids Road)	Interchange; Highway 406 exit 11; Highway 58 northern terminus
1.000 mi = 1.609 km; 1.000 km = 0.621 mi
