= List of numbered roads in Niagara Region =

List of regional roads

This article lists all of the numbered regional roads in Regional Municipality of Niagara, Ontario. This list also contains all recently downloaded regional roads (heretofore marked as "RR"), which are marked in grey. The standard Niagara Regional Road sign is indicated at the right, with RR 20 providing the example.

| Route number | Name(s) | Western/Southern Terminus | Eastern/Northern Terminus | Communities | Comments |
|---|---|---|---|---|---|
| Niagara Regional Road 1 (West) | Michener Road, Farr Avenue | Point Abino Road | Gorham Road | Ridgeway, Crystal Beach | Originally included Michener Road, Pleasant Beach Road, and Beach Road from RR 98 (Empire Road) to Point Abino Road; remainder downloaded in 2012 |
| Niagara Regional Road 1 | Dominion Road | RR 116 (Gorham Road) | Lakeshore Road (Niagara Parkway) | Ridgeway, Crystal Beach, Fort Erie | Former Highway 3C |
| Niagara Regional Road 2 | Caistorville Road | Indian Line (Haldimand County border; continues as Haldimand Road 2) | RR 65 (Silver Street) | Caistorville | |
| Niagara Regional Road 3; (West) | Lakeshore Road, Station Road, Wainfleet Concession Road 1 | Haldimand County border (continues as Haldimand Road 3) | Highway 3 | Willow Bay, Long Beach | |
| Niagara Regional Road 3; (Centre) | Main Street | Highway 3 at Port Colborne/Wainfleet boundary | Intersection of Highway 3 and Highway 140 | Port Colborne | Former Highway 3 |
| Niagara Regional Road 3 | Garrison Road | Highway 3 and Rosehill Road | RR 124 (Central Avenue) | Fort Erie | Former Highway 3 |
| Niagara Regional Road 3A | Mellanby Avenue, Welland Street | RR 3 (Main Street) west of Bridge 19 of Welland Canal | RR 3 (Main Street) east of Bridge 19 | Port Colborne, Ontario | Mellanby Avenue formerly RR 503, Welland Street former part of RR 68 (South) |
| Niagara Regional Road 4 | Wellandport Road | Highway 3 | RR 27 (Riverside Road) | Wellandport | Formerly RR 20 before download of Highway 20 |
| Niagara Regional Road 5; (West) | Killaly Street West | Highway 3 | RR 3A (Mellanby Avenue) | Port Colborne | Downloaded 2002, then uploaded back to the Region in 2008 |
| Niagara Regional Road 5; (East) | Killaly Street East | RR 68 (Welland Street) | Highway 3 | Port Colborne, Gasline | Downloaded after 2002 |
| Niagara Regional Road 6 | Caistor Centre Road, Twenty Road, South Grimsby Road 15 | RR 65 (Bismark Road) | Former Highway 20, now RR 20 | Caistor Centre | Downloaded after 2002 |
| Niagara Regional Road 7 | Marshagan Road | Haldimand County border (continues as Haldimand Road 7) | RR 45 (Creek Road) | Dunnville (via Haldimand Road 7) | Originally numbered RR 545 in original 1969 regional road plan, renumbered later |
| Niagara Regional Road 8 | Grassie Road, Woolverton Road | Former Highway 20 (now RR 20) | RR 79 (Ridge Road) | Grassie | Downloaded after 2002 |
| Niagara Regional Road 9 | York Road | Haldimand County border (continues as Haldimand Road 9) | RR 2 (Caistorville Road) | Empire Corners, York (via Haldimand Road 9) | Originally numbered RR 502 in original 1969 regional road plan, renumbered later |
| Niagara Regional Road 10 | Casablanca Boulevard | RR 81 (Main Street) | RR 39 (North Service Road West) | Grimsby | |
| Niagara Regional Road 11 | Erie Road | Point Abino Road | Ridgeway Road | Bay Beach, Crystal Beach | Downloaded after 2002 |
| Niagara Regional Road 12 | Grimsby Road, Mountain Road, Mountain Street, Christie Street | RR 20 (Former Highway 20) | Olive Street | Grimsby | |
| Niagara Regional Road 14; (South) | Smithville Road, Townline Road, Canborough Street, Griffin Street South | Haldimand County border (continues as Haldimand Road 14) | RR 20 (Former Highway 20) | Caistor Corners, Smithville | |
| Niagara Regional Road 14; (Centre) | Station Street, Thirty Road | RR 20 (Former Highway 20) | RR 73 (Mud Street East) | Smithville | Originally included Thirty Road north of RR 73, Ridge Road East and Park Road to RR 81 (Main Street East) downloaded after 2002 |
| Niagara Regional Road 14; (North) | Bartlett Avenue | RR 81 (Main Street East) | Lake Street | Grimsby | |
| Niagara Regional Road 15 (Original) | Garrison Road | Highway 3 at RR 126 (Concession St) | RR 124 (Centre St) | Fort Erie | Part of original 1969 regional road grid, renumbered as eastern part of RR 3 sometime later |
| Niagara Regional Road 15 | Robinson Road | Haldimand County border (continues as Haldimand Road 15) | RR 63 (Canborough Road) | Dunnville (via Haldimand Road 15) | Originally numbered RR 563 in original 1969 regional road plan, renumbered later |
| Niagara Regional Road 16 | Port Davidson Road | RR 63 (Canborough Road) | RR 14 (Twenty Road) | Port Davidson, Smithville | Downloaded after 2002 |
| Niagara Regional Road 17 | Bertie Street | Queen Elizabeth Way | Niagara Parkway | Fort Erie | Downloaded after 2002 |
| Niagara Regional Road 18 | Mountain Road, Ontario Street | RR 73 (Fly Road) | RR 39 (North Service Road) | Beamsville | Once extended south on Mountain Road and Beamsville Road to RR 69 (Twenty Mile Creek Road) |
| Niagara Regional Road 19 | Gilmore Road | Queen Elizabeth Way | Niagara Parkway | Fort Erie | |
| Niagara Regional Road 20; (West) | Highway 20, West Street, Griffin Street North. St. Catharines Street, Highway 20, Bismark Road, Canboro Road | Hamilton border (continues as Hamilton Road 20) | Intersection of Highway 58 and Highway 20 | Smithville, Fonthill, Allanburg | Former Highway 20. Offers a scenic route in comparison to the Queen Elizabeth Way. Concurrent with Highway 58 between Highway 406 and Centre Street. |
| Niagara Regional Road 20; (East) | Lundy's Lane, Ferry Street | Intersection of Highway 20 and RR 70 (Thorold Townline Road) | RR 102 (Stanley Avenue) | Niagara Falls | Former part of RR 51, renumbered after downloading of Highway 20 |
| Niagara Regional Road 21 | Bowen Road, Philips Street | RR 116 (Stevensville Road) | Niagara Parkway | Stevensville, Fort Erie | |
| Niagara Regional Road 22; (South) | Campden Road | RR 69 (Twenty Mile Creek Road) | RR 73 (Fly Road) | Campden | Downloaded after 2002 |
| Niagara Regional Road 22; (North) | Merritt Road | RR 81 (King Street) | South Service Road | Lincoln | Downloaded before 2002 |
| Niagara Regional Road 23 | Forks Road | Highway 3 and RR 24 (Vineland Townline Road) | Highway 58 | Originally extended to RR 68 (Kingsway) in Dain City | |
| Niagara Regional Road 24 | Vineland Townline Road, Victoria Avenue | Highway 3 and RR 23 (Forks Road) | RR 39 (North Service Road) | Chambers Corners, Vineland | Part of route between Highway 3 and RR 27 was formerly a portion of Highway 3A |
| Niagara Regional Road 25 | Netherby Road | RR 84 (Doan's Ridge Road) | Niagara Parkway | Welland, Netherby, Snyder | |
| Niagara Regional Road 26 | Jordan Road | RR 81 (King Street) | RR 39 (North Service Road) | Jordan | |
| Niagara Regional Road 27 | Wellandport Road, "Regional Road 27" (formerly River Road), Riverside Drive, West Main Street, East Main Street, Shisler Road | RR 20 (Former Highway 20) and RR 65 (Bismark Road) | RR 98 (Montrose Road) | Bismark, Wellandport, Welland | Section between RR 24 (Vineland Townline Road) and RR 54 (Prince Charles Drive) was formerly a portion of Highway 3A. Section between RR 20 and RR 24 was formerly Highway 57 |
| Niagara Regional Road 28 (South) | Balfour Road, Metler Road, Cream Street, Sixteen Road, Effingham Street | RR 63 (Canborough Road) | RR 69 (Pelham Road) | Fenwick, North Pelham | Downloaded after 2002 |
| Niagara Regional Road 28 (North) | Fifth Street Louth | RR 69 (Pelham Road) | RR 81 (St. Paul Street West) | St. Catharines | |
| Niagara Regional Road 29 | Webber Road, Lincoln Street | RR 24 (Vineland Townline Road) | RR 54 (Prince Charles Drive) | Welland | Before 2002, continued east to RR 62 (Memorial Park Drive) |
| Niagara Regional Road 30 | Lakeshore Road, Golf Course Road | RR 3 (Lakeshore Road at Station Road) | Highway 3 | Burnaby | Downloaded after 2002 |
| Niagara Regional Road 31 | Broadway Avenue, Ontario Road | RR 27 (Riverside Drive) | RR 62 (Memorial Park Drive) | Welland | Downloaded after 2002 |
| Niagara Regional Road 32 | Effingham Street | RR 20 (Former Highway 20) | RR 28 (Sixteen Road at Effingham Street) | Ridgeville, Effingham | Downloaded after 2002 |
| Niagara Regional Road 33 | Humberstone Road | Feeder Road (Welland) | Highway 58, Highway 58A and RR 54 (Prince Charles Drive) | Welland | |
| Niagara Regional Road 33 (Old) | Humberstone Road | Highway 58A | RR 60 (Southworth Street) | Welland | Downloaded after 2002 |
| Niagara Regional Road 34 | Seventh Street Louth | RR 81 (St. Paul Street West) | RR 87 (Lakeshore Road) | St. Catharines | |
| Niagara Regional Road 35 | Dunn Street | RR 104 (Dorchester Road) | RR 102 (Stanley Avenue) | Niagara Falls | Downloaded after 2002 |
| Niagara Regional Road 36 | South Pelham Road | RR 29 (Webber Road) | RR 41 (Woodlawn Road) | Welland, Fonthill | Originally extended to RR 20 via Pelham Street South (downloaded 2006) |
| Niagara Regional Road 37 | Merritt Road | RR 50 (Merrittville Highway) | Highway 406 | Welland | Former part of Highway 58 / Highway 406 concurrency |
| Niagara Regional Road 37; (Old) | Murray Street | RR 102 (Stanley Avenue) | Niagara Parkway | Niagara Falls | Downloaded after 2002 |
| Niagara Regional Road 38 | Martindale Road | RR 77 (Fourth Avenue) and RR 72 (Louth Street) | RR 87 (Lakeshore Road) | St. Catharines | |
| Niagara Regional Road 39; (West) | North Service Road | Hamilton border | Olive Street | Grimsby | |
| Niagara Regional Road 39; (East) | North Service Road | Grimsby-Lincoln border | Third Street Louth | Beamsville, St. Catharines | |
| Niagara Regional Road 39; (Old) | Clifton Hill | RR 51 (Victoria Avenue) | Niagara Parkway | Niagara Falls | Downloaded after 2002 |
| Niagara Regional Road 40 (West) | South Service Road | Hamilton border | RR 12 (Christie Street) | Grimsby | |
| Niagara Regional Road 40 (Centre) | South Service Road | Nelles Road North | Twenty-first Street Louth | Grimsby, Beamsville, Jordan Harbour | |
| Niagara Regional Road 40 (East) | Bayview Boulevard, South Service Road | Dead end at Jordan Harbour | RR 38 (Martindale Road) | Jordan Station, St. Catharines | |
| Niagara Regional Road 40 (Old) | Niagara Street | RR 27 (West Main Street) | Then Highway 58 (Thorold Road at Niagara Street) | Welland | Renumbered to RR 50 after downloading of parts of Highway 58 in early 1970s |
| Niagara Regional Road 41; (Original) | Queen Street | RR 51 (Victoria Avenue) | Niagara Parkway | Niagara Falls (downtown) | Part of original 1969 regional road grid, downloaded sometime later |
| Niagara Regional Road 41 | Woodlawn Road | RR 36 (South Pelham Road) | Highway 406 | Welland | Section Between Seaway Dr. and Highway 406 formerly unsigned Highway 7236 |
| Niagara Regional Road 42 | Ontario Street | RR 91 (Westchester Avenue) and RR 81 (St. Paul Street/St. Paul Street West) | RR 87 (Lakeshore Road) and RR 44 (Lakeport Road) | St. Catharines | |
| Niagara Regional Road 43 | Bridge Street | RR 102 (Stanley Avenue) | Niagara Parkway at the Whirlpool Rapids Bridge | Niagara Falls | |
| Niagara Regional Road 44 | Lake Street, Lakeport Road | Queen Elizabeth Way (Exit 46) | RR 87 (Lakeshore Road at Lakeport Road) and RR 42 (Ontario Street) | Port Dalhousie, St. Catharines | Downloaded after 2002 |
| Niagara Regional Road 45 | Creek Road | RR 63 (Canborough Road) | RR 27 (Riverside Road) | Wellandport | |
| Niagara Regional Road 46 | Geneva Street | Interchange with Highway 406 and RR 91 (Westchester Avenue) | RR 581 (Church Street) | St. Catharines | Originally extended north to RR 87 (Lakeshore Road) |
| Niagara Regional Road 47 | Lyons Creek Road | RR 98 (Montrose Road) | RR 116 (Sodom Road) | Chippawa | Once extended west on Biggar Road to RR 84 (Moyer Road) |
| Niagara Regional Road 47; (West) | Carl Road | RR 84 (Moyer Road) | RR 98 (Montrose Road) | Crowland Twp. | Rerouted along Biggar Road before 1983 |
| Niagara Regional Road 48 | Niagara Street | Interchange with Highway 406, RR 46 (Geneva Street) and RR 91 (Westchester Avenue) | RR 87 (Lakeshore Road) | St. Catharines | |
| Niagara Regional Road 49 | McLeod Road, Marineland Parkway | Queen Elizabeth Way | RR 102 (Stanley Avenue) | Niagara Falls | Originally extended east to Portage Road then along Portage Road to RR 116 (Main Street); extended west to RR 70 (Thorold Townline Road) |
| Niagara Regional Road 50 | Niagara Street, Merritville Highway, Glenridge Avenue | RR 27 (West Main Street) | RR 91 (Westchester Avenue) | Welland, Thorold, St. Catharines | |
| Niagara Regional Road 51 | Lundy's Lane, Ferry Street, Victoria Avenue | Highway 20 and RR 70 (Thorold Townline Road) | Niagara Parkway | Niagara Falls | Renumbered as RR 20 west of RR 102 (Stanley Avenue), downloaded remainder after 2002 |
| Niagara Regional Road 52 | Richmond Street, Ormond Street, Merritt Street, Hartzel Road, Bunting Road | RR 56 (Collier Road) | RR 87 (Lakeshore Road) | Thorold, Merritton, St. Catharines, Port Weller | Downloaded after 2002 |
| Niagara Regional Road 53 | Niagara Falls Road, Beaverdams Road | RR 553 (Allanburg Road) | RR 20 (Lundy's Lane) | Thorold South, Niagara Falls | Downloaded after 2002 |
| Niagara Regional Road 54 | Prince Charles Drive, Rice Road | Intersection of Highway 58, Highway 58A, and RR 33 (Humberstone Road) | RR 20 (Former Highway 20) | Welland, Fonthill | Section between RR 41 and RR 20 downloaded to local municipalities between 2002–2006 |
| Niagara Regional Road 55; (Original) | Richmond Street | RR 56 (Collier Road) | (Then) Highway 58 (Ormond St) | Thorold | Original part of 1969 regional road grid, later renumbered as part of RR 52 when Highway 58 along Ormond St was downloaded to the region |
| Niagara Regional Road 55 | Niagara Stone Road; Mississagua Street | RR 81 (Queenston Road) and RR 70 (Taylor Road) | RR 87 (Mary Street) | Homer, Virgil, Niagara-on-the-Lake | Former Highway 55 |
| Niagara Regional Road 56 | Collier Road, Burleigh Hill Drive | RR 67 (Beaverdams Road) | RR 89 (Glendale Avenue) | Thorold, St. Catharines | Downloaded in 2002, then uploaded back to the Region in 2007 |
| Niagara Regional Road 57 | Thorold Stone Road | RR 70 (Thorold Townline Road) east of Highway 58 | RR 102 (Stanley Avenue) | Thorold, Niagara Falls | |
| Niagara Regional Road 58 | Homer Road | RR 89 (Glendale Avenue) | RR 70 (Taylor Road) | Niagara College Glendale Campus | Formerly known as Coon Road |
| Niagara Regional Road 59 | Morrison Street | RR 104 (Dorchester Avenue) | Zimmerman Avenue | Niagara Falls | Downloaded after 2002 |
| Niagara Regional Road 60 | Southworth Street, Crowland Avenue | RR 33 (Humberstone Road) | RR 27 (East Main Street) | Welland | Downloaded after 2002 |
| Niagara Regional Road 61 | Townline Road, Portage Rd. | RR 100 (Four Mile Creek Road) | Niagara Parkway | St. David's, Queenston | Extended onto Portage Rd. After the removal of the 405 and Niagara Parkway interchange in 2006. |
| Niagara Regional Road 62 | Memorial Park Drive, Wellington Street | RR 31 (Ontario Road) | RR 27 (East Main Street) | Welland | Downloaded after 2002 |
| Niagara Regional Road 63 (West) | Canborough Road | Haldimand County border (continues as Haldimand Road 63) | RR 24 (Vineland Townline Road) | Wellandport, Fenwick, Ridgeville, Fonthill | Originally extended east to RR 36 (Pelham Street South) via Church Hill |
| Niagara Regional Road 63 (Centre) | Port Robinson Road | RR 36 (Pelham Street South) | Highway 406 | Fonthill, Port Robinson | Downloaded after 2002. Originally extended across Bridge 12 of the Welland Canal until 1974 when bridge was destroyed. |
| Niagara Regional Road 63 (East) | Chippawa Creek Road | RR 82 (Allanport Road) | RR 98 (Montrose Road) | Port Robinson | Originally extended west across Bridge 12 of the Welland Canal until 1974 when bridge was destroyed. |
| Niagara Regional Road 64 | Steele Street, Westside Road | RR 66 (Sugarloaf Street) | Highway 3 at Highway 58 | Port Colborne | Downloaded after 2002 |
| Niagara Regional Road 65 | Bismark Road | Hamilton border (continues as Hamilton Road 65) | Intersection of RR 20 (Former Highway 20) and RR 27 (Former Highway 57) | Bismark | |
| Niagara Regional Road 66 | Sugarloaf Street, King Street | RR 64 (Steele Street) | RR 3 (Main Street West) | Port Colborne | Downloaded after 2002 |
| Niagara Regional Road 67 | Beverdams Road, Pine Street | RR 50 (Merrittville Highway) | Highway 58 | Thorold | Originally extended north to RR 52 (Richmond Street) |
| Niagara Regional Road 68 | King Street | RR 527 (Division Street) | RR 27 (East Main Street) | Welland | Originally included King Street down to RR 31 (Ontario Street), plus Canal Bank Street & Kingsway from RR 31 to RR 23 (Forks Road). Remainder downloaded after 2002. |
| Niagara Regional Road 68 (South) | Clarence Street, Welland Street | RR 64 (Steele Street) | RR 3 (Main Street East) | Port Colborne | Downloaded after 2002. Part of road currently part of RR 3A. |
| Niagara Regional Road 69 | Twenty Mile Creek Road, Twenty Road, Pelham Road, | RR 20 (Former Highway 20) | Intersection with RR 89 (Glendale Avenue) | St. Ann's, St. Catharines | Originally extended east to RR 81 (St. Paul Street West) |
| Niagara Regional Road 70 | Taylor Road, Thorold Townline Road | RR 63 (Chippawa Creek Road) | Intersection of RR 81 (Queenston Road) and RR 55 (Niagara Stone Road) | Homer | |
| Niagara Regional Road 71 | Sir Isaac Brock Way (formerly St. David's Road) | RR 50 (Merrittville Highway at Glenridge Avenue) | Highway 406 | Brock University area of St. Catharines | Originally extended east to RR 52 (Ormond Street) |
| Niagara Regional Road 72 | Louth Street | RR 69 (Pelham Road) | RR 77 (Fourth Avenue) and RR 38 (Martindale Road) | St. Catharines | |
| Niagara Regional Road 73 | Mud Street, Fly Road | Hamilton border (once continued as Hamilton-Wentworth Road 411) | RR 24 (Victoria Avenue) | Grassie, Grimsby Centre, Campden | |
| Niagara Regional Road 75 | Twenty-First Street Louth, Sixth Avenue Louth | RR 669 (Eighth Avenue Louth) | RR 24 (Victoria Avenue) | Balls Falls | Downloaded before 2006 |
| Niagara Regional Road 77 | Fourth Avenue, Welland Avenue | RR 26 (Jordan Road) | Queen Elizabeth Way | Jordan, St. Catharines | Originally extended east to RR 52 (Bunting Road) |
| Niagara Regional Road 78 | Chippawa Road, Humberstone Concession 2 | RR 3 (Main Street) | RR 68 (Welland Street) | Port Colborne | Part of original 1969 regional road grid, downloaded sometime later |
| Niagara Regional Road 79 | Ridge Road | Hamilton border (once continued as Hamilton-Wentworth Road 425) | RR 14 (Park Road) | Grimsby | Downloaded after 2002 |
| Niagara Regional Road 80 | Elm Street | RR 66 (Sugarloaf Street) | RR 23 (Forks Road) | Port Colborne, Dain City | Downloaded after 2002 |
| Niagara Regional Road 81 | Main Street East, Main Street West, King Street, St. Paul Street, Queenston Street, York Road | Hamilton Boundary (Continues as Hamilton Road 8) | Niagara Parkway | Grimsby, Beamsville, Vineland, Jordan, St. Catharines, Homer, St. David's, Queenston | Former Highway 8 & Highway 8A. Includes part of original QEW alignment built before the Garden City Skyway was constructed. Portion between Regional Road 42 and Regional Road 91 downloaded after 2002. |
| Niagara Regional Road 82 | Allanport Road | RR 63 (Chippawa Creek Road) | Highway 20, Highway 58 and RR 20 (Lundy's Lane) | Allanburg, Port Robinson | |
| Niagara Regional Road 83 | Carlton Street, Carlton Road | RR 42 (Ontario Street) | RR 55 (Niagara Stone Road) | St Catharines | |
| Niagara Regional Road 84 | Miller Road, Doan's Ridge Road, Moyer Road | Highway 3 | RR 63 (Chippawa Creek Road) | Gasline, Cook's Mills | Originally extended south to RR 5 (Killaly Street East). |
| Niagara Regional Road 85 | East-West Line | RR 87 (Lakeshore Road) | Niagara Parkway | Virgil, Niagara-on-the-Lake | Downloaded after 2002 |
| Niagara Regional Road 86 | Stewart Road | RR 55 (Niagara Stone Road) | RR 87 (Lakeshore Road) | Homer | |
| Niagara Regional Road 87 | Lakeshore Road, Main Street, Lakeport Road, Lakeshore Road, Mary Street, King Street, Picton Street, Queen's Parade | RR 34 (Seventh Street Louth) | Niagara Parkway | Port Dalhousie, St. Catharines, Port Weller, Niagara-on-the-Lake | |
| Niagara Regional Road 88 | Seaway Haulage Road | RR 83 (Carlton Road) | Read Road | St. Catharines | Only public open section of a former cargo haulage route to the east of the Welland Canal. |
| Niagara Regional Road 89 | Glendale Avenue | RR 69 (Pelham Road) and RR 72 (Louth Street) | Queen Elizabeth Way, RR 81 (York Road) | St. Catharines, Merritton | |
| Niagara Regional Road 90 | Airport Road | RR 81 (York Road) | RR 55 (Niagara Stone Road) | Niagara-on-the-Lake | Serves St. Catharines/Niagara District Airport |
| Niagara Regional Road 91 | Westchester Avenue | RR 81 (St. Paul Street) | RR 81 (Queenston Road) | St. Catharines | Originally extended to RR 52 (Bunting Road) via Eastchester Avenue |
| Niagara Regional Road 93 | Scott Street | RR 44 (Lake Street) | RR 52 (Bunting Road) | St. Catharines | Downloaded after 2002. |
| Niagara Regional Road 95 | Linwell Road | RR 42 (Ontario Street) | RR 52 (Bunting Road) | St. Catharines | Downloaded after 2002. |
| Niagara Regional Road 98 | Wilhelm Road, Forkes Road, Schihl Road, Montrose Road | Highway 3 | RR 101 (Mountain Road) | Niagara Falls | Originally extended south on Empire Rd. to RR1 (Beach Rd.) before 2002 downloading |
| Niagara Regional Road 99 | Quaker Road | RR 36 (Pelham Street South) | RR 50 (Niagara Street) | Fonthill, Welland | Downloaded after 2002 |
| Niagara Regional Road 100 | Four Mile Creek Road | RR 101 (Mountain Road) | RR 55 (Niagara Stone Road) | Virgil, St. David's, Niagara Falls | Former Highway 8. Originally extended south to RR 49 (McLeod Road) and north to RR 87 (Lakeshore Road) |
| Niagara Regional Road 101 | Mountain Road | RR 70 (Taylor Road) | RR 102 (Stanley Avenue) | Niagara Falls | |
| Niagara Regional Road 102 | Stanley Avenue | RR 47 (Lyons Creek Road) | RR 61 (Townline Road) at Highway 405 | Niagara Falls | Passes by Marineland |
| Niagara Regional Road 104 | Dorchester Road | RR 49 (McLeod Road) | RR 101 (Mountain Road) | Niagara Falls | Downloaded after 2002 |
| Niagara Regional Road 106 | Niagara Concenssion 7 | RR 81 (York Road) | RR 55 (Niagara Stone Road) | Niagara-on-the-Lake | Downloaded after 2002 |
| Niagara Regional Road 108 | Portage Road, Main Street | RR 20 (Ferry Street) | RR 100 (Portage Road at Drummond Street) and RR 57 (Thorold Stone Road) | Niagara Falls | Downloaded after 2002 |
| Niagara Regional Road 112 | Point Abino Road | Michener Road | Highway 3 | | Originally extended north to RR 25 (Netherby Road) and south to RR 11 (Erie Road); remainder downloaded in 2012 |
| Niagara Regional Road 114 | Niagara Concession 1 Road | RR 81 (York Road) | RR 85 (East-West Line) | Queenston, Niagara-on-the-Lake | Downloaded after 2002 |
| Niagara Regional Road 116 | Gorham Road, Stevensville Road, Sodom Road | RR 1 (Dominion Road) | RR 47 (Lyons Creek Road) | Ridgeway, Stevensville, Chippawa | Originally extended south to RR 11 (Erie Road) and north along Main Street to Niagara Parkway at RR 49 (Marineland Parkway); portion between Farr Avenue and Dominion Road downloaded in 2012 |
| Niagara Regional Road 118 | Pettit Road | Highway 3 | RR 19 (Gilmore Road) at Queen Elizabeth Way | Fort Erie | Downloaded after 2002 |
| Niagara Regional Road 118 (Old) | Graeber Avenue, Ridge Road South, Thunder Bay Road, Prospect Point Road | RR 116 (Ridgeway Road) | RR 1 (Dominion Road) | Crystal Beach, Ridgeway | Downloaded before 2002 |
| Niagara Regional Road 120 | Stonemill Road, Ridgemount Road | RR 1 (Dominion Road) | RR 21 (Bowen Road) | Fort Erie | Downloaded after 2002 |
| Niagara Regional Road 122 | Thompson Road, Helena Street | RR 1 (Dominion Road) | RR 21 (Bowen Road at Phipps Street) | Fort Erie | |
| Niagara Regional Road 124 | Central Avenue | Niagara Parkway south of RR 3 (Garrison Road) | Niagara Parkway north of RR 21 (Phipps Street) | Fort Erie | First exit (Toronto-bound on Queen Elizabeth Way) / Last Exit (Fort Erie/Buffalo-bound) |
| Niagara Regional Road 126 | Concession Road | RR 3 (Garrison Road) | RR 19 (Gilmore Road) | Fort Erie | Downloaded after 2002 |
| Niagara Regional Road 140 | Elizabeth Street | RR 5 (Killaly Street East) | Highway 3 at Highway 140 | Port Colborne | Southern extension of Highway 140. Downloaded after 2002 |
| Niagara Regional Road 216 | Sixteen Road | RR 24 (Vineland Townline Road) | RR 28 (Cream Street at Sixteen Road) | North Pelham | Downloaded after 2002. Spur route of RR 28. |
| Niagara Regional Road 420 | Roberts Street, Newman Hill, Falls Avenue | Highway 420 and RR 102 (Stanley Avenue) | Rainbow Bridge | Niagara Falls | Former part of Highway 420, connecting the QEW to the Rainbow Bridge |
| Niagara Regional Road 503 | Mellanby Avenue | RR 3 (Main Street) | RR 68 (Welland Street) | Port Colborne | Renumbered as part of RR 3A after 2002. |
| Niagara Regional Road 512 | Livingston Avenue | RR 10 (Casablanca Boulevard) | RR 81 (Main Street) | Grimsby | Spur of RR 81 |
| Niagara Regional Road 514 | Thirty Road | RR 14 (Thirty Road at Ridge Road) | RR 81 (King Street) | Beamsville | Spur of RR 14. Downloaded after 2002 |
| Niagara Regional Road 525 | Townline Tunnel Road | Highway 58A | RR 25 (Netherby Road) east of RR 84 (Doan's Ridge Road) | Welland | Spur of RR 25 |
| Niagara Regional Road 527 | Division Street, Burger Street | RR 27 (West Main Street) and RR 50 (Niagara Street) | RR 27 (East Main Street) | Welland | Eastbound portion of one-way pair (along with RR 27) through downtown Welland |
| Niagara Regional Road 529 | River Road, Effingham Street | Welland-Port Colborne Airport | RR 29 (Webber Road) | Welland | Spur of RR 29. Connects to Niagara Central Airport |
| Niagara Regional Road 538 | Thorold Road | RR 36 (South Pelham Road) | RR 50 (Niagara Street) | Welland | Downloaded after 2002. |
| Niagara Regional Road 549 | Main Street, Bridgewater Street | RR 49 (Portage Road) at RR 116 (Main Street) | Niagara Parkway | Chippawa | One-way streets. Main St. northbound; Bridgewater St. southbound. Later renumbered as an extension of RR 116? |
| Niagara Regional Road 553 | Allanburg Road | Highway 58 | RR 53 (Niagara Falls Road) | Thorold South | Spur of RR 53. Downloaded after 2002 |
| Niagara Regional Road 569 | St. Ann's Road | RR 20 (Former Highway 20) | RR 69 (Twenty Mile Creek Road) | St. Ann's | Spur of RR 69. Downloaded after 2002 |
| Niagara Regional Road 575 | Glen Road, Nineteenth Street Louth | RR 75 (Twenty-First Street Louth) | RR 81 (King Street) | Balls Falls, Jordan | Spur of RR 75. Downloaded before 2002 |
| Niagara Regional Road 581 | Church Street | RR 48 (Geneva Street) | RR 46 (Niagara Street) | St. Catharines | Westbound portion of one-way pair (along with RR 81) through downtown St. Catharines. Originally extended west along Church Street and King Street to RR 42 (Ontario Street). |
| Niagara Regional Road 612 | Ontario Street | RR 81 (Main Street) | Queen Elizabeth Way | Grimsby | Spur of RR 14, originally part of 1969 regional road plan, downloaded later |
| Niagara Regional Road 614 | Townline Road | RR 14 (Townline Road at Canborough Street) | RR 20 (Former Highway 20) | Smithville | Spur of RR 14 |
| Niagara Regional Road 627 | O'Reilly's Road | RR 27 (Riverside Road) | RR 529 (River Road) | Welland | Spur of RR 27. Connects to Niagara Central Airport |
| Niagara Regional Road 669 | Eighth Avenue Louth | RR 24 (Victoria Avenue) | RR 69 (Twenty Road) | | Spur of RR 69 |
| Niagara Regional Road 675 | Twenty-first Street Louth | RR 75 (Twenty-first Street Louth at Sixth Avenue Louth) | RR 575 (Glen Road) | Ball's Falls | Short spur route of RR 75. Downloaded before 2002 |
| Niagara Regional Road 681 | King Street, William Street | RR 42 (Ontario Street) | St. Paul Street | St. Catharines | Northbound portion of one-way pair (along with RR 42) through downtown St. Catharines. |
| Niagara Regional Road 714 | Park Road | RR 73 (Mud Street) | RR 79 (Ridge Road East) at RR 14 (Park Road) | Grimsby | Spur of RR 14. Downloaded after 2002 |
| Niagara Regional Road 801 | Brookfield Road | Highway 3 (Garrison Road) | RR 25 (Netherby Road) | Gasline, Port Colborne | Part of original 1969 regional road grid, downloaded sometime later |
| Niagara Regional Road 802 | Point Abino Road | Highway 3 (Garrison Road) | RR 25 (Netherby Road) | | Part of original 1969 regional road grid, renumbered as part of RR 112 later |
| Niagara Regional Road 803 | Ridge Road | Highway 140 | RR 84 (Doan's Ridge Road) | Welland, Cooks Mills | Part of original 1969 regional road grid, downloaded sometime later |
Former Route
