= Cooks Mills, Ontario =

Cooks Mills, Ontario can mean the following places:

- Cooks Mills, Niagara Region, Ontario
- Cooks Mills, Nipissing District, Ontario in North Bay
- Spragge, Ontario in Algoma District, previously known as Cook's Mills
