= Dain City, Ontario =

Dain City
- Unincorporated community
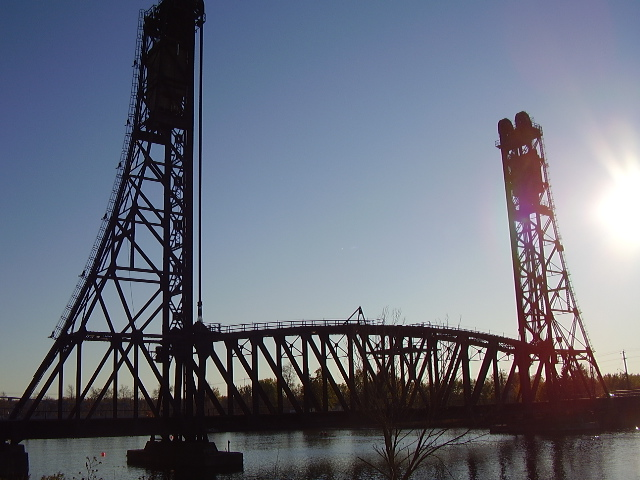
- Dain City Railroad Bridge over the old Welland Canal in Dain City
- Interactive map of Dain City
- Coordinates: 42°56′45″N 79°14′36″W
- Country: Canada
- Province: Ontario
- Regional municipality: Niagara
- City: Welland
- Time zone: UTC-5 (EST)
  - Summer (DST): UTC-4 (EDT)
- Forward sortation area: L3B, L3C
- Area codes: 905 and 289
- NTS Map: 30L14 Welland
- GNBC Code: FAVEG

Dain City is a small suburb at the southernmost part of Welland, Ontario, Canada. At one time, it was a mostly self-contained rural community at the junction of two significant rail lines, part of the Township of Humberstone, and was called Welland Junction. The name was changed to Dain City after it was annexed to the city of Welland in the mid-1950s. Dain City was built for, and by, the Marshall Dain Manufacturing Company (Now known as John Deere), the area's main employer, as a "company town".

In September 2008, John Deere announced it would be close its plant with a loss of 800 jobs and relocate to Wisconsin and Mexico by the end of 2009.

The geography and character of Dain City is largely a factor of its proximity to the Welland Canal, the only shipping channel between Lake Ontario and Lake Erie in the Great Lakes system. For many years, the canal ran along Dain City's western side and through the city of Welland itself, with numerous bends and bridges along the way. Those included two lift bridges in Dain City, However, in April 2019, The Forks Road Bridge (Bridge 18.) was removed, Only the Train Bridge (Bridge 17) Remains. The completion of the Welland By-Pass in 1973, a massive six-year excavation project to by-pass the whole city of Welland with a wider and straighter channel, significantly altered and isolated Dain City, turning it into a peninsula with the new canal on its eastern side and the old and new canals meeting at its southern tip.

Dain City's lift bridge's lift capabilities were removed in the 1980s, although it is still in use by vehicular traffic.

Notably, Dain City was once home to a large drive-in theater, the Welland Drive-In, located on the south side of Forks Road between the old rail line and the new canal, constructed in 1954 and torn down in 1981.

Dain City contains four housing subdivisions: "Glennwood Park", "Regatta Park", "Seaway Village", and "Welland Junction". The old canal, renamed the Welland Recreational Waterway, hosts international rowing regattas and dragon boat races annually, and also the South Niagara Rowing Club, which is affiliated with area high schools.

== Geography ==
Dain City, in the south of the city of Welland where the Welland Recreational Waterway and the Welland By-Pass meet, is separated by the massive approaches to the Townline Tunnel required to provide the low grade for the rail lines that use the tunnel. Technically, both the east side of Welland and Dain City are peninsulas, surrounded by the waters of the old and new channels of the Welland Canal and connected to "solid" ground only by the relatively small plug in the old canal along the Townline Tunnel approaches.
