= Thorold Tunnel =

Highway tunnel in Thorold, Ontario, Canada

Coordinates: 43.11580°N 79.19409°W

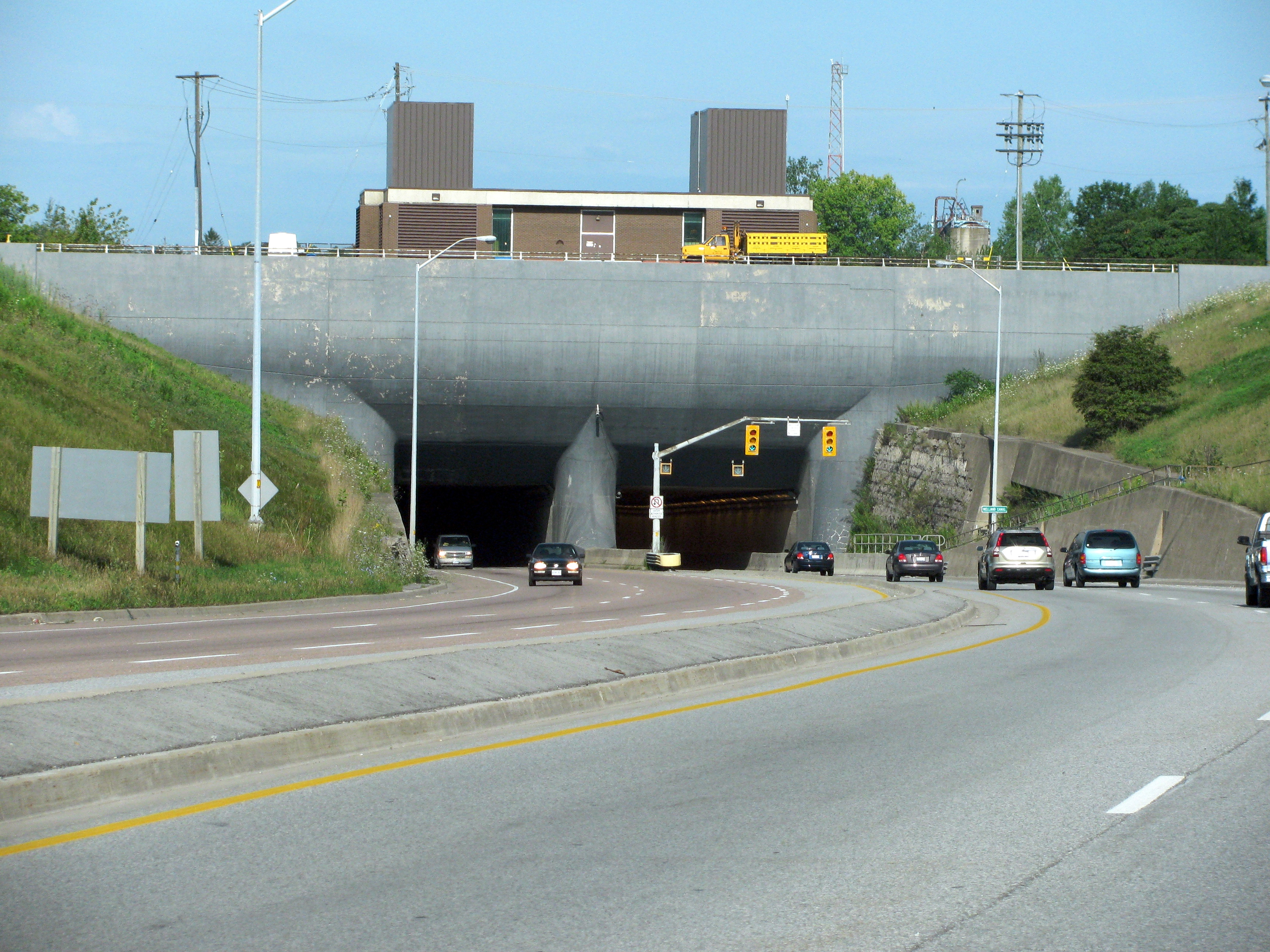
- Tunnel seen from the east
- Interactive map of Thorold Tunnel

Overview
- Route: Highway 58
- Crosses: Welland Canal

Operation
- Constructed: 1965-67
- Opened: 1967
- Operator: Ministry of Transportation
- Traffic: Vehicle and pedestrian
- Vehicles per day: 24,300 (2014)

Technical
- Length: 840 metres (2,760 ft)
- No. of lanes: 4
- Operating speed: 80 kilometres per hour (50 mph)
- Tunnel clearance: 4.5 metres (15 ft)

The Thorold Tunnel is an underwater tunnel in Thorold, Ontario, Canada carrying Highway 58 underneath the Welland Canal. Built between 1965 and 1967, the tunnel is 840 metres in length and consists of two separate tubes each containing two lanes of traffic. The westbound tube has a sidewalk for pedestrians.

It is one of three tunnels under the Welland Canal (the other two being the Main Street and Townline Tunnels in Welland), and the only tunnel to be constructed after the waterway opened.

The tunnel has been used as a filming location due to its relatively low traffic levels, including for the television series American Gothic and the movie Highwaymen.

Due to repair work on the tunnel's ceiling tiles, the Ontario Ministry of Transportation began daily closures of the westbound tube in April 2018 outside of morning rush hour. The repairs are an interim measure and a tender for full rehabilitation of the tunnel was issued by the Ministry on April 4, 2018. In April, 2024 construction began on the Thorold Tunnel, resulting in nighttime closures and daytime lane restrictions.
