= Niagara Parkway =

Scenic parkway in Ontario

- Niagara Boulevard

Route information
- Maintained by the Niagara Parks Commission
- Length: 55.0 km (34.2 mi)

Major junctions
- South end: Old Fort Erie – Fort Erie
- North end: Fort George – Niagara-on-the-Lake

Location
- Country: Canada
- Province: Ontario

Highway system
- Parkways of the Great Lakes; Long Sault; Niagara; St. Clair; 1000 Islands; Roads in Ontario

The Niagara Parkway, formerly known as Niagara Boulevard and historically as the Niagara Road, is a scenic road in the province of Ontario that travels on the Canadian side of the Niagara River from the town of Fort Erie to Niagara-on-the-Lake. The portion north of Table Rock in the city of Niagara Falls is designated as an Ontario Scenic Highway. Niagara Boulevard originally referred only to the section from Fort Erie to Chippawa.

The Niagara Parkway begins at Fort Erie in the south. It passes through several villages along the river before passing through the tourist district of Niagara Falls. North of the city it provides access to several attractions, including the Whirlpool Rapids, Butterfly Conservatory, and Brock's Monument at Queenston Heights. The route ends at Fort George, southeast of the urban centre of Niagara-on-the-Lake.

Construction on the modern Niagara Parkway began in 1908; it was completed from Lake Erie to Lake Ontario in 1931 as a scenic road with gardens and manicured lawns throughout its length. The parkway was referred to by Sir Winston Churchill, having been driven down it, as "the prettiest Sunday afternoon drive in the world."

== Route description ==
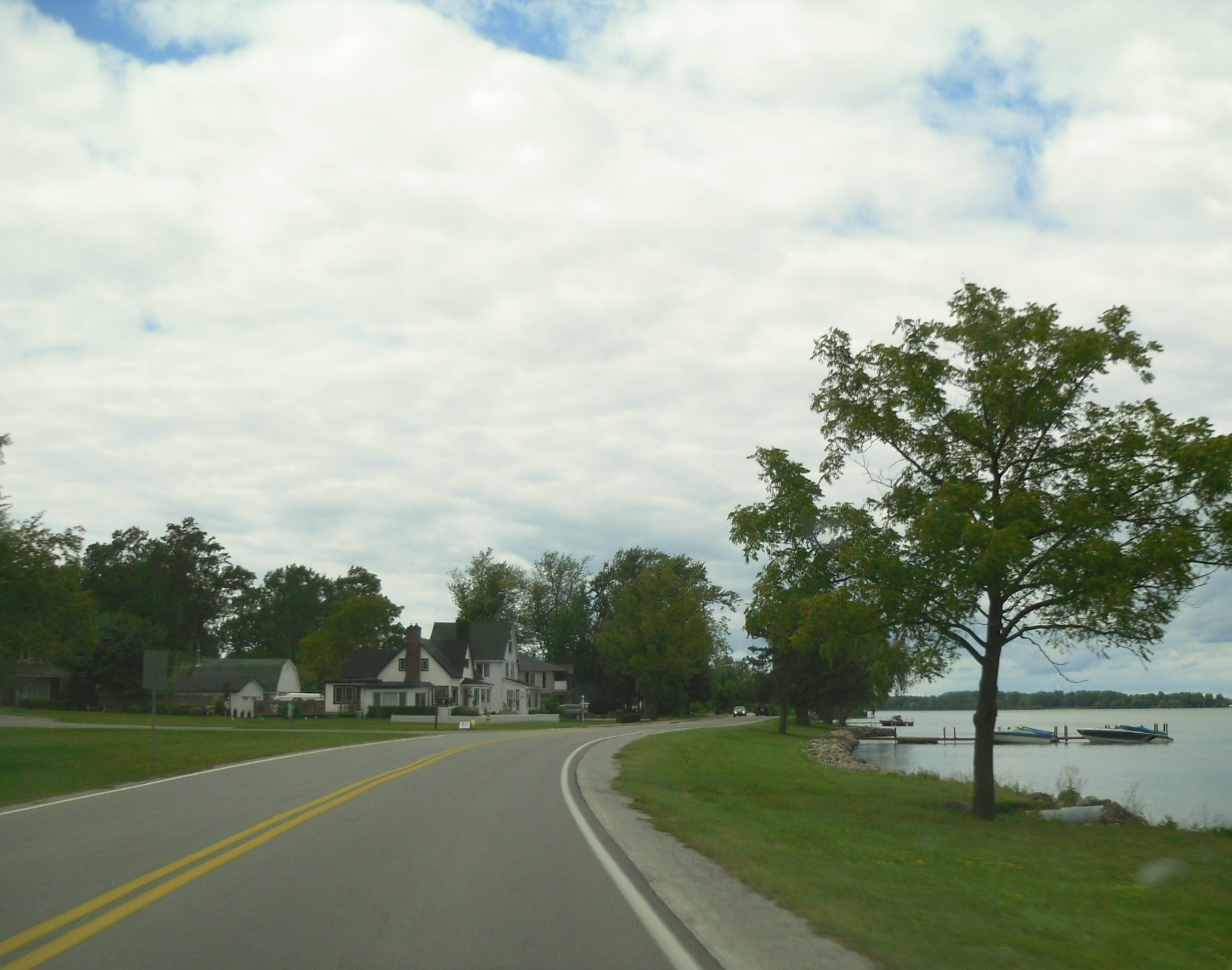
The parkway winds along the western shore of the Niagara River. North of the falls it is within metres of the river.

The Niagara Parkway is a two-lane minor arterial road with a 60 km/h (37 mph) speed limit for the majority of its length, although the section from Hiram Street to Upper Rapids Boulevard in Niagara Falls is a four lane divided road signed at 40 km/h (25 mph). It is 55 km (34 mi) in length, crossing the entire Niagara Peninsula between Lake Erie and Lake Ontario. The route falls under the jurisdiction of the Niagara Parks Commission, an agency of the Government of Ontario, for most of its length. However, the section from Hiram Street to Glenview Avenue belongs to the City of Niagara Falls. Despite this, it is still signed as part of the Niagara Parkway. The Niagara River Recreation Trail, a mixed-use pedestrian and cycling path, follows 53 km (33 mi) of the length of the parkway between Niagara-on-the-Lake and Fort Erie.

The parkway begins at the old Fort Erie, south of the Peace Bridge, where it is known as Lakeshore Road and connects with the Queen Elizabeth Way (QEW) and the former Highway 3. East of the Mather Circle, the road becomes known as Niagara Parkway and proceeds north through downtown Fort Erie, beneath the International Railway Bridge. It gradually curves to the east opposite the southern shore of Grand Island. Houses line the southern side of the parkway along this section. The road curves back northward as it crosses the Black Creek and passes through a sparsely populated stretch. It passes the Willoughby Historical Museum followed by the Legends on the Niagara Golf Course. Shortly thereafter, it enters the City of Niagara Falls and meets the Welland River. Traffic is diverted west to cross the river at Portage Road, where it then resumes on the Niagara Parkway at King's Bridge Park.

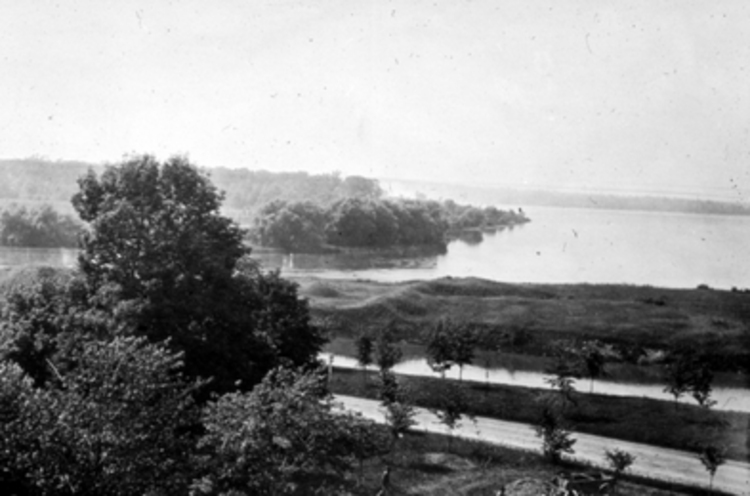
Following the excavation of the Chippawa Cut in 1829, the Niagara Road became heavily used as a tow road for ships exiting the Welland Canal

The Niagara Parkway travels alongside the Upper Rapids and passes adjacent to Horseshoe Falls. It crosses through Queen Victoria Park and enters downtown Niagara Falls, where it is known as River Road north of Clifton Hill. The parkway passes below the Rainbow Bridge; side streets provide access to Highway 420, but River Road itself does not meet it. As the road progresses north, it passes beneath the Whirlpool Rapids Bridge before wrapping around the Whirlpool Rapids. At Victoria Avenue, River Road becomes the Niagara Parkway again. The parkway passes the Butterfly Conservatory and crosses the Sir Adam Beck Hydroelectric Power Stations. Shortly thereafter, it passes by the Niagara Floral Clock, one of the largest floral clocks in the world with a diameter of 12.2 m (40 ft). It passes beneath Highway 405 at the Lewiston–Queenston Bridge; the Parkway's interchange with Highway 405 was removed by December 2006.

North of the bridge, the route descends the Niagara Escarpment near Brock's Monument, a column which commemorates the death of Sir Isaac Brock during the Battle of Queenston Heights. At the bottom of the escarpment, the route passes the village of Queenston. The parkway meanders north, parallel to the river, with houses lining the western side. Approaching the town of Niagara-on-the-Lake, the road becomes known as Queen's Parade. It diverges from the river and travels northwest towards the town, ending at Fort George.

== History ==
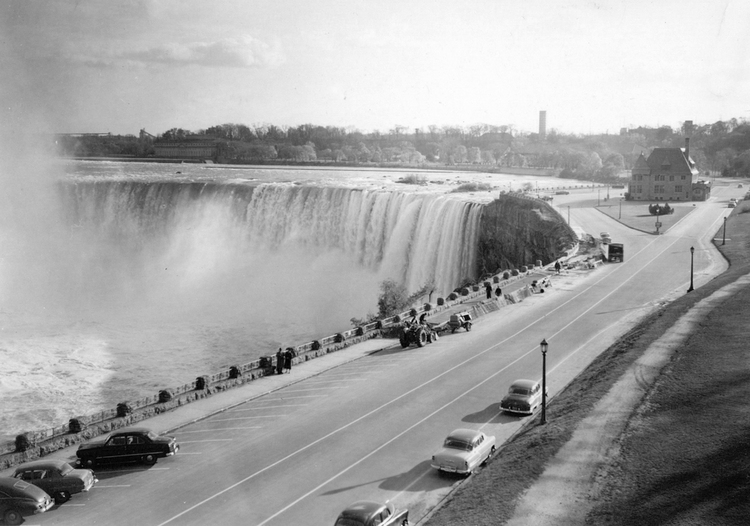
By 1955, Niagara Boulevard more-or-less resembled the modern parkway

The Niagara Parkway is one of the oldest roads in Ontario. Predating it, an aboriginal trail along the west side of the Niagara River existed before the arrival of Europeans. The first survey along the length of the river was done by Augustus Jones in 1786. The survey set aside a one chain reserve along the bank of the river for military purposes; one chain being equivalent to 20 metres (66 ft). Despite this reserve, early settlers extended their fences to the river. In 1791, the Land Board ordered that the fences be removed to permit the reserve's use as a public road. The Niagara Road quickly became the primary route between Fort Erie and Fort George. Its importance grew with the declaration of war against the Americans in June 1812. During the war, the road became vital for the movement of militia and supplies, and accordingly it was one of the primary frontiers of the war.

When the First Welland Canal was opened in 1829, the Niagara Road became a towpath for vessels exiting the Welland River. Oxen on the road would tow boats against the rapid current of the Niagara River as they exited the canal and continued south to Lake Erie. In 1833, a large cut was made to connect the canal with Port Colborne, eliminating the use of the road as a towpath. It continued to be used as a public road until the government gave the reserve to the Niagara Parks Commission in 1891.

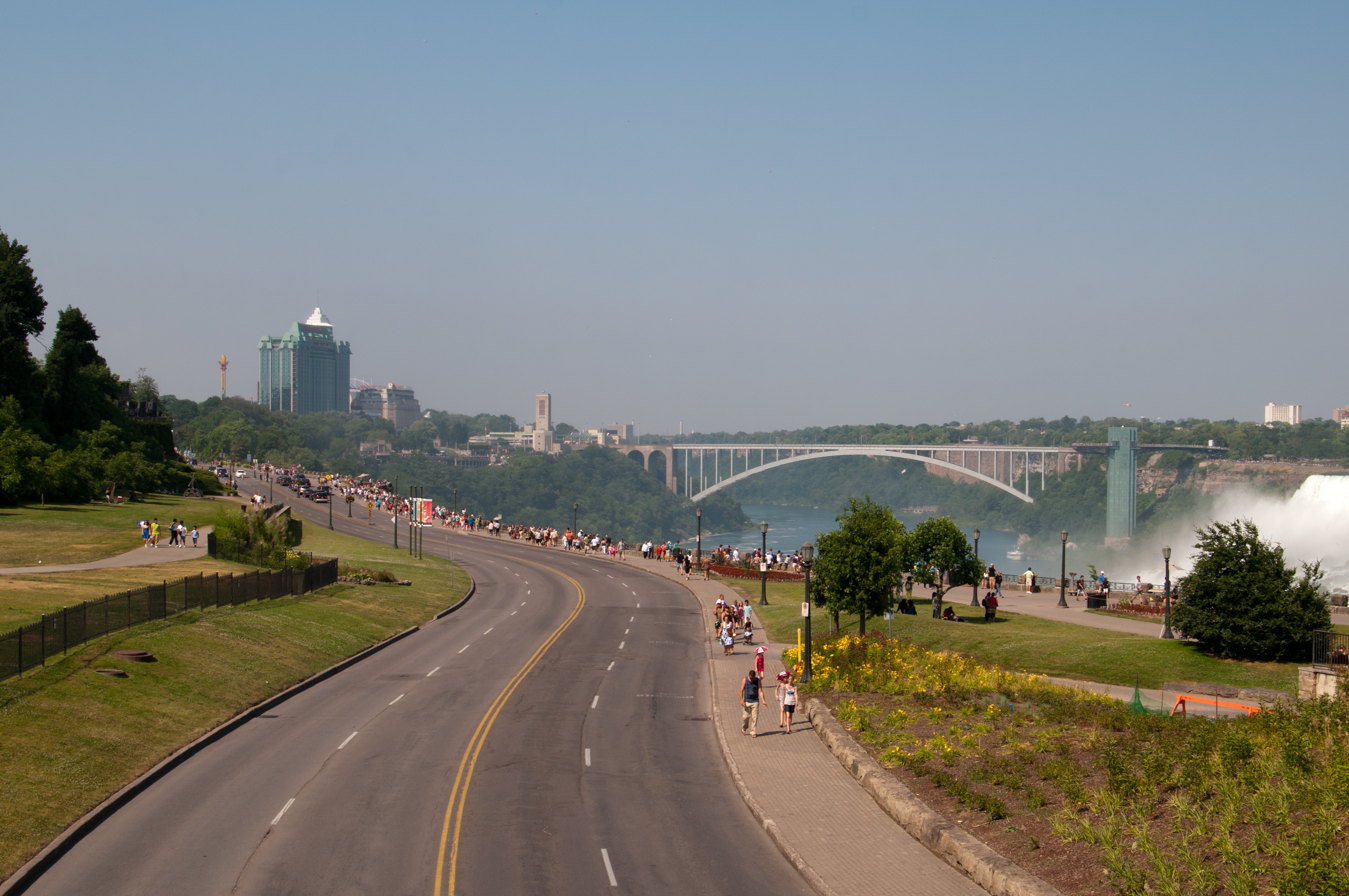
Niagara Parkway through Niagara Falls, 2012

In 1908, after receiving approval from the government, the Parks Commission began to expropriate land along the length of the river. The broadened strip of land was used to construct a new paved parkway, which was opened in segments. The new parkway was ornamental and designed to be aesthetically pleasing, a prime consideration of road construction at that time. The section south of the falls was completed first, opening in 1912. It was extended north to the Whirlpool Rapids, incorporating the existing River Road, by 1915. The section between the rapids and Queenston was opened between 1921 and 1923. Finally, the remaining section between Queenston and Niagara-on-the-Lake opened in 1931, completing the present parkway.

In mid-August 1943, Winston Churchill came to Canada to attend the Quebec Conference, a then-secret meeting in Quebec City to discuss a strategy for the invasion of France during World War II (which would come to be known as D-Day). Prior to the conference, he met with William Lyon Mackenzie King several times. Between the meetings and conference, Churchill visited Niagara Falls and was driven along the Niagara Parkway, after which he described it as "the prettiest Sunday afternoon drive in the world."

On May 30, 1977, the City of Niagara Falls assumed River Road between Hiram Street, north of the Rainbow Bridge, and Glenview Avenue, east of Victoria Avenue. This section is still designated as part of the Niagara Parkway despite not being under the jurisdiction of the Niagara Parks Commission.

== Major intersections ==
The following table lists the major junctions along Niagara Parkway. The entire route is located in the Regional Municipality of Niagara.

| Location | km | mi | Destinations | Notes |
|---|---|---|---|---|
| Fort Erie | 0.0 | 0.0 | Fort Erie | Access to Queen Elizabeth Way and Ontario Highway 3 via Central Avenue; Mather Circle was the terminus for the QEW before the current border plaza was built; Fort Erie |
| Fort Erie | 2.6 | 1.6 | Regional Road 17 (Bertie Street) | |
| Fort Erie | 5.4 | 3.4 | Regional Road 124 (Central Avenue) | |
| Black Creek | 16.3 | 10.1 | Regional Road 25 (Netherby Road) | |
| Chippawa | 27.4 | 17.0 | Regional Road 49 north (Portage Road); Regional Road 47 west (Main Street) | Parkway detours to cross Welland River |
| Niagara Falls | 32.4 | 20.1 | Falls Avenue to Highway 420 | |
| Niagara Falls | 32.6 | 20.3 | Clifton Hill | Tourist district for Niagara Falls |
| Niagara Falls | 34.8 | 21.6 | Queen Street | |
| Niagara Falls | 36.8 | 22.9 | Victoria Avenue | |
| Queenston | 42.4 | 26.3 | Highway 405 west – St. Catharines, Toronto | Ramp removed in December 2006 |
| Queenston | 44.0 | 27.3 | Regional Road 81 west (York Road) – St. Catharines | |
| Niagara-on-the-Lake | 55.0 | 34.2 | Fort George | |
1.000 mi = 1.609 km; 1.000 km = 0.621 mi: Closed/former

== See also ==
- The Niagara Scenic Parkway, a scenic parkway along the American side of the Niagara River.
