= Mid-Peninsula Highway =

Cancelled Ontario freeway

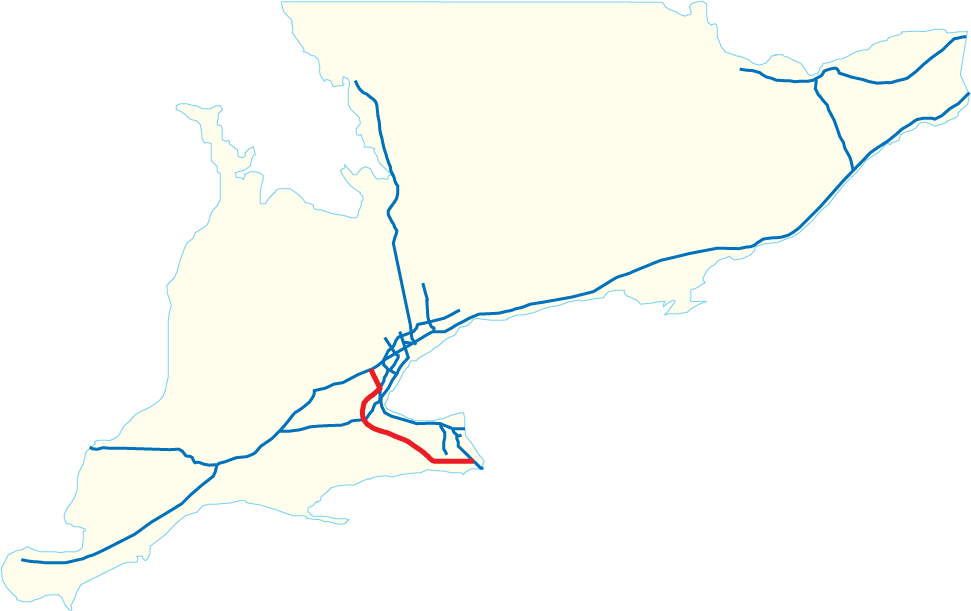
- Proposed routing of the Mid-Peninsula Highway.

Route information
- History: Proposed since 1950s current status varies

Major junctions
- West end: Highway 407 near Burlington
- Highway 403 – Hamilton; Highway 406 – Welland
- East end: Queen Elizabeth Way – Fort Erie

Location
- Country: Canada
- Province: Ontario
- Counties: Niagara Region, Halton Region
- Major cities: Hamilton

Highway system
- Roads in Ontario

The Mid-Peninsula Highway is a proposed freeway across the Niagara Peninsula in the Canadian province of Ontario. Although plans for a highway connecting Hamilton to Fort Erie south of the Niagara Escarpment have surfaced for decades, it was not until The Niagara Frontier International Gateway Study was published by the Ministry of Transportation of Ontario (MTO) in 1998 that serious examination and planning began. The study called for an alternative route to the QEW, which runs through tender fruitlands and is not capable of expansion beyond its current configuration. The land on which studies are being performed for this future freeway is referred to as the Mid-Peninsula Corridor or the Niagara–GTA Corridor.

== Route description ==
As proposed, the Mid-Peninsula Highway would connect Highway 403 in Hamilton with a twinned Peace Bridge in Fort Erie. North of Hamilton, it would curve and meet Highway 407 or Highway 401 north of Burlington. The entire freeway would be above the Niagara Escarpment in consideration of the wine-producing fruitlands that lie at its base; a consideration that was ignored during the construction of the QEW despite the protests of farmers.

Connections with the southward extension of Highway 406 would be provided near Welland, as well as with the controlled-access section of Highway 6 north of Caledonia, where the freeway would pass near John C. Munro Hamilton International Airport. The majority of the route west of the Welland Canal would travel south of Highway 20.

== History ==
The successive Ontario Conservative governments of Premiers Mike Harris and Ernie Eves planned to forego a full environmental assessment of the freeway after a study indicated an urgent need for its construction. The Niagara Frontier International Gateway Study was published by the MTO in 1998 and indicated that the freeway was of vital importance. Prior to this study, various proposals for a freeway above the Niagara Escarpment had surfaced for several decades, though no serious examination of its merits was undertaken.

However, with the election of the Liberal government under Dalton McGuinty in 2003, a formal study was initiated. After developing the Growth Plan for the Greater Golden Horseshoe, the McGuinty government launched a new Niagara to GTA corridor environmental assessment to study transportation needs in the corridor.

A draft Transportation Development Study to consider alternative or complementary infrastructure to a freeway was completed in February 2011. The study recommended the routing be split into three groups, with route planning to commence for the eastern portion, further corridor study in the western portion and to halt but otherwise continue monitoring needs for a new transportation link in the central portion. As a result of the study, the Regional Municipality of Niagara has initiated an environmental assessment to identify and design a new 400-series highway linking Highway 406 and the QEW between Welland and Fort Erie, forming the eastern portion of the Mid-Peninsula Highway. Corridor planning has the support of the provincial government.

As of February 2019, the project is still in the planning phase and the Standing Committee on Transport, Infrastructure and Communities of the House of Commons recommended that the federal government "should consider the creation of a Mid-Peninsula Transportation Corridor".
