= Main Street Tunnel =

Road tunnel in Welland, Ontario, Canada

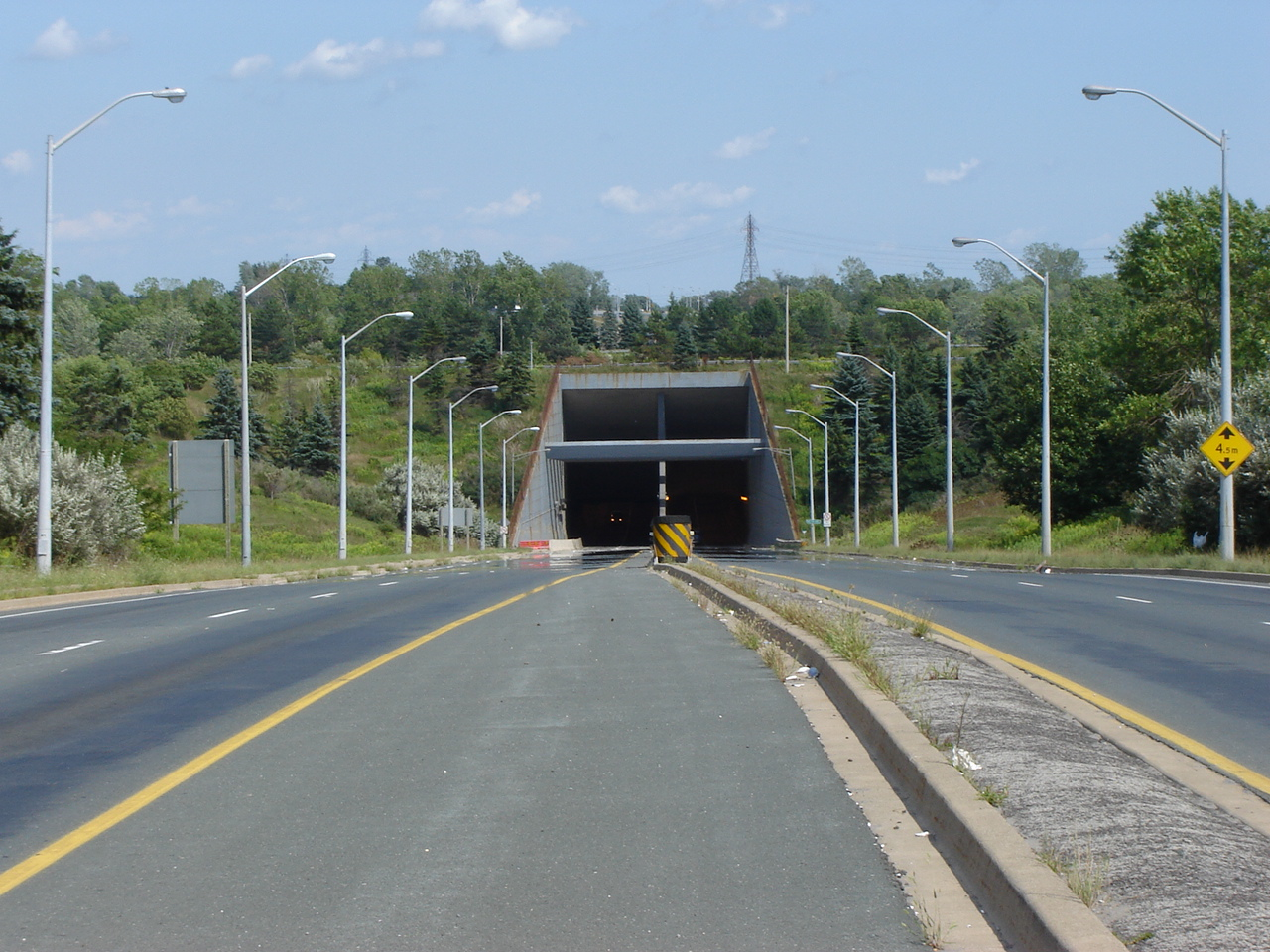
- Western approach to the Main Street Tunnel
- Interactive map of Main Street Tunnel

Overview
- Location: Welland Canal, Welland, Ontario
- Coordinates: 42.993222°N 79.216704°W
- Route: Niagara Road 27 and the unsigned designation of Highway 7146

Operation
- Opened: May 20, 1972; 54 years ago
- Owner: Ministry of Transportation of Ontario

Technical
- No. of lanes: 4

The Main Street Tunnel, located in Welland, Ontario, Canada, is an underwater tunnel, carrying Niagara Road 27 and the unsigned designation of Highway 7146 under the Welland Canal. It is named as a part of East Main Street.

The structure was built as a part of the Welland By-Pass project. Its construction was relatively easy since, like the Townline Tunnel, it was constructed at the same time as the channel above it and a simple cut and cover. The tunnel was officially opened on May 20, 1972.

== Description ==
The tunnel links Highway 406 on the west side of the canal, which travels north to St. Catharines to Highway 140 on the east side, which travels south to Port Colborne. Niagara Regional Road 27 also provides a connection from Welland eastward to Niagara Falls.

The tunnel provides four lanes for traffic, two in each direction, separated by a full-height concrete wall. There is also a sidewalk for pedestrian use in the westbound section.

== History ==
The Main Street Tunnel, like the nearby Townline Tunnel to the south, was constructed in the early 1970s as part of the Welland Bypass of the Welland Canal. It was built using a cut and cover technique, whereby the tunnel was excavated, the concrete poured, and the structure buried, on top of which the canal channel was built. This avoided costly boring beneath an active waterway; the structure cost C$11 million. This price was split 50–50 between Transport Canada and the St. Lawrence Seaway Authority. The tunnel opened with a parade featuring the Welland Police pipe band and various officials on the morning of May 20, 1972.

== See also ==
- Thorold Tunnel
