= Ontario Highway 406 =

Controlled-access highway in Ontario

Highway 406
- Highway 406 highlighted in red

Route information
- Maintained by Ministry of Transportation of Ontario
- Length: 26.0 km (16.2 mi)
- Existed: December 7, 1965–present

Major junctions
- North end: Queen Elizabeth Way – St. Catharines
- Highway 58 – Thorold
- South end: Regional Road 27 – Welland

Location
- Country: Canada
- Province: Ontario

Highway system
- Ontario provincial highways; Current; Former; 400-series
← Highway 405	→ 407 ETR / Highway 407

King's Highway 406 (pronounced "four-oh-six"), commonly referred to as Highway 406, is a 400-series highway in the Canadian province of Ontario. The primary north–south route through the central portion of the Niagara Peninsula, Highway 406 connects Welland, Thorold and downtown St. Catharines to the Queen Elizabeth Way (QEW).

Construction of Highway 406 began in 1963. The first section opened between St. Davids Road and Geneva Street on December 7, 1965, followed by a southward extension to Beaverdams Road in late 1969. The route was later extended south as a super two to Merritt Road where it became Highway 58. In 1977, construction began to connect the freeway with the QEW; this was completed in late 1984. Construction resumed in 1987 to extend Highway 406 further south to Welland, albeit as a super two, where it ended at a signalized intersection at East Main Street and this was completed in 1995. In 2009 construction resumed on the highway to expand the remaining two-lane sections to a four-lane divided freeway, with the existing route becoming the southbound lanes of the new freeway. The southern terminus in Welland was converted to a roundabout while the remaining at-grade intersections were rebuilt as interchanges.

The speed limit is 110 km/h (68 mph) throughout most of its length, with the exceptions being north of Fourth Avenue, where the speed limit is 100 km/h (62 mph), and between Fourth Avenue and Westchester Avenue in St. Catharines, where the speed limit is 80 km/h (50 mph). The route is patrolled by the Ontario Provincial Police (OPP) and maintained by the Ministry of Transportation of Ontario (MTO).

== Route description ==
From 1987 until 2015, Highway 406 was unique as the only 400-series highway with two lane sections and with an at-grade rail crossing. The highway is heavily travelled within St. Catharines, but volumes drop considerably south of the city.

The 406 designation begins at East Main Street in Welland at a roundabout immediately west of East Main Street Tunnel beneath the Welland Canal. From here the now-four-lane divided road veers northeast and travels parallel to the canal. Two golf courses separate the canal. As the highway passes to the west of them, it jogs to the west and crosses a Trillium Railway spur (formerly at-grade, now over the railway), and meets Daimler Parkway and Woodlawn Road at a newly constructed interchange. Soon after, it crosses the Welland River and then the former channel of the canal, which was replaced by the current Welland By-Pass in the 1970s.

The highway curves to the northwest as it passes through thick forest, and meets another newly built interchange with Merritt Road (formerly Highway 58), which as of 2009 was being rebuilt as a grade-separated interchange. After this, it returns to its northward orientation and passes the final former at-grade intersection, Niagara Regional Road 63 (Port Robinson Road).

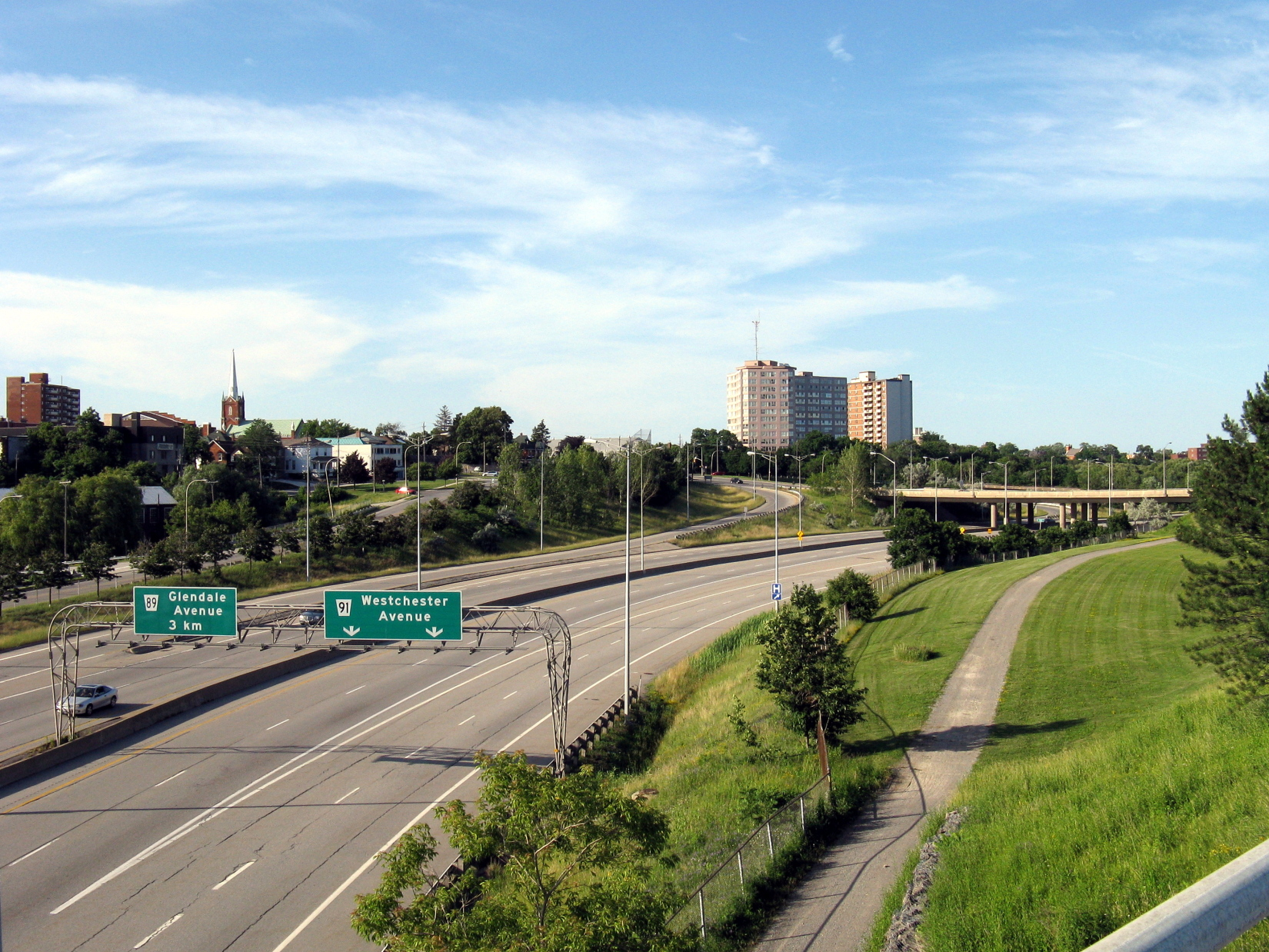
Highway 406 in downtown St. Catharines

North of Port Robinson Road, the forests break and the freeway continues straight north for 7 km (4.3 mi) through a mostly agricultural area. Along the straightaway are interchanges with former Highway 20 and Niagara Regional Road 67 (Beaverdams Road). The freeway crosses over Lake Gibson, and curves to the northeast. It passes beneath Niagara Regional Road 71 (St. Davids Road) and Highway 58 at a complicated interchange as it descends the Niagara Escarpment, a UNESCO Biosphere Reserve, and enters St. Catharines.

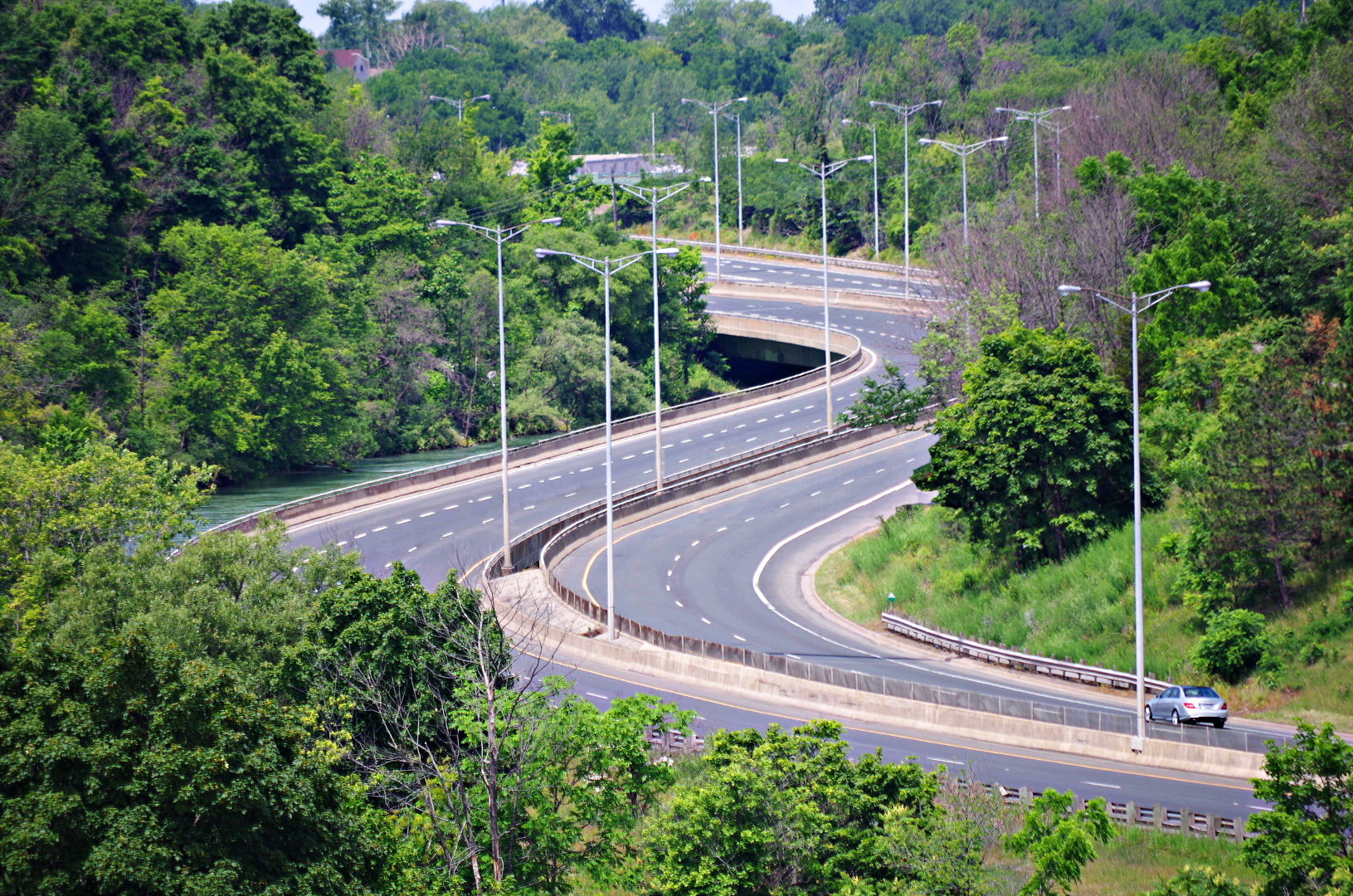
Highway 406 curves through Twelve Mile Creek in St. Catharines

Within St. Catharines, Highway 406 twists frequently, entering the Twelve Mile Creek valley south of a complicated interchange with Westchester Avenue and Geneva Street and curving west. It passes beneath the high-level St. Paul Street bridge, crosses the creek and intersects Fourth Avenue. Exiting the creek valley, the freeway parallels Fourth Avenue for a 1 kilometre (0.62 mi), gradually curves to the north and ends 3 km (1.9 mi) to the north, ending at a trumpet interchange with the QEW.

== History ==
Planning for Highway 406 began in early 1959, when Minister of Highways Fred M. Cass presented the Ontario Roads and Streets report to the Ontario Legislative Assembly on March 16, outlining highways needs for the province over 20 years. One of the planned routes was a freeway to link Highway 3 in Port Colborne with the QEW, travelling alongside the Welland Canal. By 1961, route studies and planning were well underway. The future route was designated as Highway 406 despite construction not beginning until 1963; the first section, between Geneva Street and St. Davids Road, opened December 7, 1965. This was followed several years later by an extension south to Beaverdams Road, which opened November 21, 1969. During the early 1970s, the highway was extended south as a Super 2 to north of the Welland River, where it curved west along Merritt Road and became Highway 58. This extension, which included the Beaverdams Road interchange and a signalized intersection, was opened on June 30, 1971.

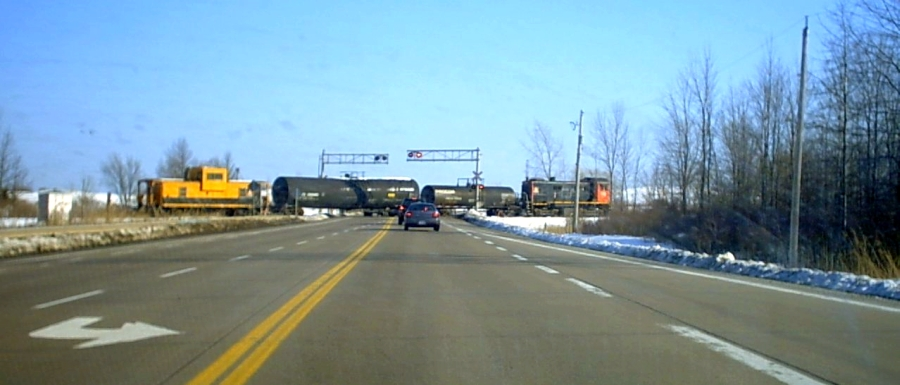
Highway 406 once featured the only at-grade railway crossing of any 400-series highway. This section was not a proper freeway, but rather a Super two. This crossing was later eliminated and grade separated in 2014 when the route was finally upgraded to freeway standards.

In 1977, construction began on the section of Highway 406 between Geneva Street and the QEW. This work included the construction of several large bridges over the widened ravine, a curving structure over Twelve Mile Creek, and the first single-point urban interchange (SPUI) in Ontario (the only other SPUI is located on Airport Parkway in Ottawa). The original design plans for Highway 406 called for this section to follow the creek valley the full distance to the QEW, interchanging with it east of Martindale Road. Instead, the alignment was moved west of the city. Realignments to several streets in St. Catharines were completed in advance of construction on overpasses, ramps and the bridges over Twelve Mile Creek; this work was finished in late 1983. Grading contracts were awarded in mid-1983 for the entire extension. Paving took place during the summer of 1984, and the route was opened to traffic in October 1984.

Further work to extend Highway 406 as a Super two south towards East Main Street in Welland began during the fall of 1987, including an eastward extension of Woodlawn Road. Construction of the bridges that carry the extension over the Welland River and old canal began in mid-1988, and was completed during the fall of 1989. Work then began to grade and pave the Woodlawn Road Extension to Highway 406, which intersected with traffic signals. Grading and paving of Highway 406 also took place from Woodlawn Road to the route's southern terminus at East Main Street, which was also a signalized intersection. The extension was completed by the mid-1990s.

=== Expansion ===
The southern end of Highway 406 in Welland

Highway 406 was the last 400-series highway that featured at-grade intersections and two lane sections. The original intention was to twin this two-lane section shortly after it was constructed in the 1970s. Plans were deferred multiple times, until the project resumed in the early 2000s. The first phase of this twinning opened to traffic in 2007, extending the four-lane highway 5.6 km (3.5 mi) from its previous convergence south of Beaverdams Road to a point north of Port Robinson Road.

On May 15 2009, Minister of Transportation Jim Bradley announced that the section from Port Robinson road to East Main Street in Welland would be converted to a full freeway; this work included a roundabout at East Main Street to replace the existing signalized intersection. Work on the Merritt Road overpass began in September 2009, and was scheduled for completion in mid-2011. On August 19, 2011, full construction began with a groundbreaking ceremony. The roundabout with East Main Street opened to traffic on September 5, 2013, featuring no central island. The existing signalized junction at Woodlawn Road was repurposed for the southbound off-ramp and on-ramp, as continuous Highway 406 traffic was rerouted upon new overpasses. By September 2015, all the at-grade intersections had been removed and Highway 406 was a minimum four-lane, controlled-access freeway for its entire length. Despite requests from local politicians, there are no plans to extend Highway 406 to Port Colborne at this time.

== Exit list ==
The following table lists the major junctions along Highway 406, as noted by the Ministry of Transportation of Ontario. Unlike other highways, Highway 406's northern terminus is tied at the QEW, whereas the southern terminus has been relocated in various proposals. As a result, exits were unconventionally numbered from north to south. The entirety of Highway 406 is located within the Regional Municipality of Niagara.

Location	km	mi	Exit	Destinations	Notes
St. Catharines	0.0	0.0	—	Queen Elizabeth Way – Niagara, Toronto	QEW exit 49; Highway 406 northern terminus
St. Catharines	3.9	2.4	4	Regional Road 77 (Fourth Avenue)	SPUI Interchange; to Niagara Health – St. Catharines Site
St. Catharines	6.0– 6.3	3.7– 3.9	6	Regional Road 46 (Geneva Street)	Northbound exit and entrance; signed as exit 6B northbound
St. Catharines	6.0– 6.3	3.7– 3.9	6	Regional Road 91 (Westchester Avenue)	No northbound entrance; signed as exit 6A northbound; to Regional Road 81 (former Highway 8)
St. Catharines	9.4	5.8	9	Regional Road 89 (Glendale Avenue)	
Thorold–St. Catharines boundary	11.5– 12.0	7.1– 7.5	10	Highway 58 south to Queen Elizabeth Way – Thorold, Niagara Falls	Signed exit 11B northbound
Thorold–St. Catharines boundary	11.5– 12.0	7.1– 7.5	11	Regional Road 71 (St. David's Road, Sir Issac Brock Parkway)	Signed as exits 11A (west) and 11B (east) southbound and exit 11A northbound
Thorold	14.2	8.8	14	Regional Road 67 (Beaverdams Road)	
Thorold	17.4	10.8	17	Regional Road 20 – Niagara Falls, Fonthill	Formerly Highway 20 / Highway 58 north; northern end of former Highway 58 concurrency
Thorold	22.0	13.7	21	Regional Road 37 (Merritt Road) – Holland	Formerly Highway 58 south; southern end of former Highway 58 concurrency
Welland–Thorold boundary	22.4	13.9	Crosses Welland River and Old Welland Canal		
Welland	24.0	14.9	23	Regional Road 41 (Woodlawn Road/Daimler Parkway)	
Welland	26.0	16.2	26	Regional Road 27 (East Main Street) to Highway 140 – Welland, Port Colborne	former Signalised intersection converted into a roundabout on September 5, 2013. Highway 406 southern terminus; to Main Street Tunnel; unsigned Highway 7146 west
1.000 mi = 1.609 km; 1.000 km = 0.621 mi: Incomplete access
