= Welland By-Pass =

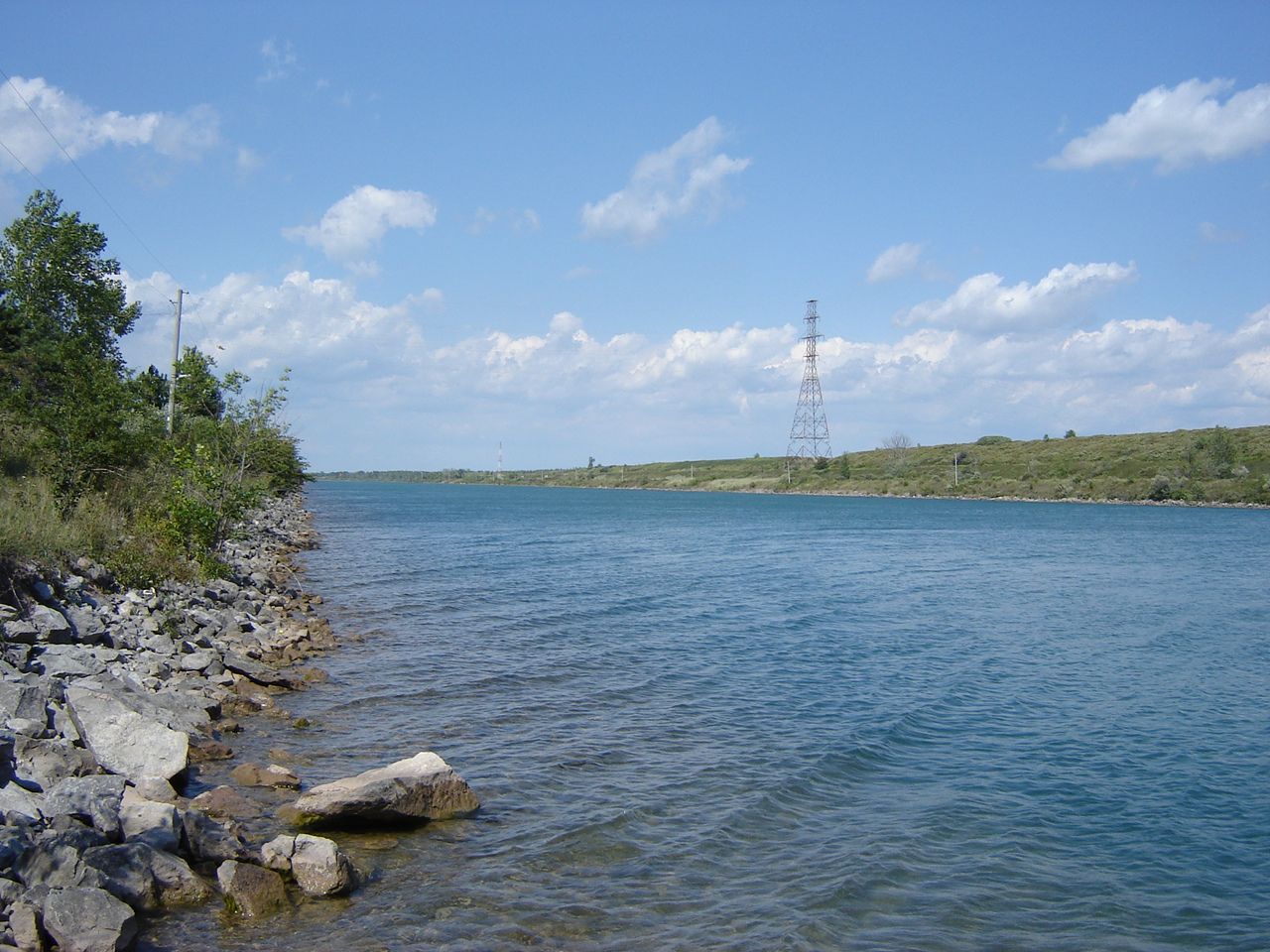
The Welland By-pass's straight and unobstructed channel outside Welland.

The Welland By-pass, completed in 1973, was a massive construction project on the Welland Canal in Ontario, Canada.

A new channel 13.4 km (8.3 mi) long was constructed, providing a shorter, more direct alignment between Port Robinson and Port Colborne and by-passing downtown Welland. The project helped improve navigation along the canal and alleviated problems the presence of a busy ship canal was causing in Welland.

== Background ==
Although the city of Welland had originally grown around the canal, the traffic in the canal began to increase. Notably, the 1959 opening of the St. Lawrence Seaway caused in increase in traffic through Welland. Despite efforts to mitigate this, such as the use of CCTV to improve ship flow, by the 1960s the constant interruptions in the flow of the vehicular and rail traffic through the city became bothersome. A single ship would hold up traffic for at least ten minutes as it travelled under a vertical lift bridge. In periods of heavy ship traffic, a bridge might stay raised for multiple ships to pass, and long lines of cars, trucks and buses could be delayed more than 30 minutes. The St. Lawrence Seaway Authority reported that, "... at time, some 50 vessels were lined up in the lakes awaiting entry for hours or even days." Additionally, many railroad yards and lines originally built on Welland's outskirts now found themselves in the middle of a growing city; the heavily used rail lines from Toronto to Buffalo were suffering delays, as well.

The old route, established in 1932 with the building of the fourth Welland Canal, was also inconvenient to the ships since it was twisting and narrow. The five vertical lift bridges and a railroad swing bridge, all within close distance of one another, made the manoeuvring tricky and the journey stressful. Captains complained of bulky buildings on the canal's edge blocking the line of sight. One of them commented, "The main thing every Lakes captain used to dread was Bridge 15 [built during the 3rd canal era, but in use until 1972], a railway bridge in the town of Welland with an abutment in the middle... I think every captain on the Lakes must have [scraped it] at one time or another."

== Options ==
Several options were considered to enhance the capacity of the canal through the Welland region. The option of widening the canal through the city was rejected due to the built-up nature of the city. Routes to the east of the current alignment, which bypassed Welland to the east, were also considered.

One such route was to direct the canal directly south from Port Robinson to Lake Erie. However, this route would require substantial investment to develop a harbour and other infrastructure on the lake, since the current Port Colborne would be bypassed. An alternate direct route from Port Robinson to Port Colborne would have encroached into Welland's post-war developments, which would have had public, political, and expropriation costs.

A third third route, which also spanned from Port Robinson to Port Colborne, but farther east around Welland through less valuable and less developed land, was ultimately selected.

Dr John N. Jackson, professor at nearby Brock University, notes that:

It is interesting that the three alternative canal routes which were considered are expressed in terms of their impact on Welland. Port Colborne does not appear to have entered the discussions. ...Their [The St. Lawrence Seaway Authority] analysis was restricted to primarily engineering considerations.

== Construction ==
The by-pass project was a massive undertaking: 16.2 km² (4,000 acres) of land was expropriated for the construction. Approximately 50 million cubic metres of material was excavated. The new channel is 100 m (330 ft) wide, as compared to the 58 m (190 ft) width of the old channel. The channel's minimum depth is 9 m (30 ft). Two tunnels, the Main Street Tunnel and the Townline Tunnel, were constructed to allow vehicles and trains to pass beneath the canal.

To complement this, an aqueduct, to convey the Welland River under the new canal alignment, was built. The aqueduct's design is what is known as a four-tube inverted-syphon culvert, 200 m (660 ft) long, 28 m (92 ft) wide, and extending 9 m (30 ft) below the navigation channel. It was constructed from 30,000 cubic metres of concrete. Approximately 1.6 km (0.99 mi) of new river channel was constructed to route the river into the aqueduct. The creation of the syphon culvert lowered ground water levels for miles around, the project making many dug wells run dry. The St. Lawrence Seaway Authority denied responsibility, but paid many residents to have a drilled well installed to supply their water (based on local witnesses).

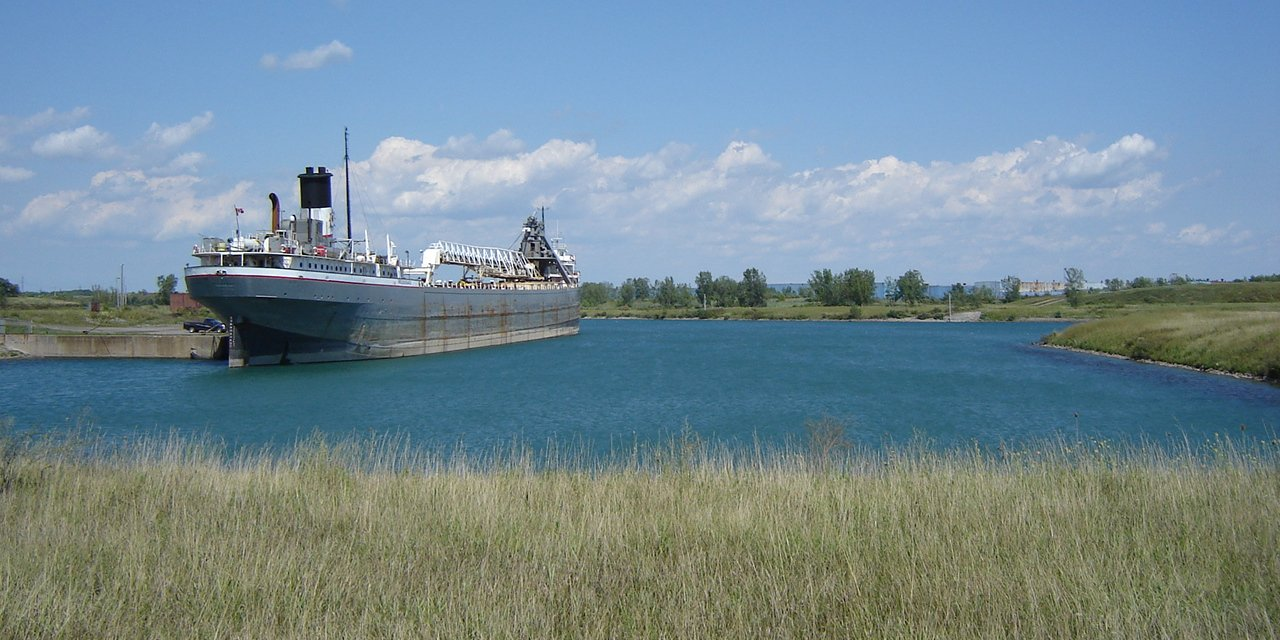
A ship at the Welland Dock. A concrete bank can be seen on the left.

In compensation for the loss of canal banks through the city of Welland, parts of which were being used as a docking area by local industries, the project incorporated a dock, separated from the main travel route.

Many of the area's rail lines, which had previously been constructed to fit around the existing alignment, had to be dramatically altered for the new alignment. An estimated 161 km (100 mi) of new track was laid at a cost of CAD$50 million. A Google map is available which shows the changes to the rail network as a result of the canal relocation, as well as changes made since. This map also details the old and new routes of the canal.

The construction started with the sinking of the first shovel on June 9, 1967, and continued for six years. (During construction, a giant "Earth mover" working on the canal, accidentally struck and ruptured a buried natural gas line, which erupted into a torch-like flame approx 90–100 meters high; there were no injuries.) In a symbolic event watched by many residents, on a snowy night, Bridge #13 on Welland's East Main Street came up for the last time, lighted by floodlights, on December 15, 1972, the new bypass would be open to shipping for the next season. (The bridge was actually quietly opened the next day to allow the passage of a St. Lawrence Seaway service vessel.)

The Main Street Tunnel was officially opened on May 20, 1972, with the Townline Tunnel following on July 13. Rail traffic through the Townline Tunnel was inaugurated on January 31, 1973. The new canal was first traversed by the Canadian Coast Guard cutter Griffon on March 27, 1973. The first commercial ship to pass through the by-pass was the M.V. Senneville on March 28, 1973. It carried a cargo of 1,063,868 bushels of barley in transit from Duluth, Minnesota to Port Cartier, Quebec. The official opening ceremony for the Welland By-pass took place on July 14, 1973.

Overall, the project cost approximately CAD$188 million, compared to the CAD$134 million originally estimated by the St. Lawrence Seaway Authority in 1965. The new channel reduced the length of the canal by 1.3 km (0.81 mi) and replaced six bridge crossings with the two new tunnels. It reduced the transit time through the Welland Canal by about 30 minutes (5%) as compared to the old alignment.

== Outcomes ==
The Welland By-pass markedly simplified ship passage along the Welland Canal. The city was no longer dependent on often erratic ship schedules. (For instance, a scheduled city-wide bus service was only instituted after the relocation.)

A decision had to be made as to the use of the old alignment. Originally, one of the proposed ideas was for it to be filled in and an extension to Highway 406 be run in it. That never came to be, and instead the old canal was turned over to the city and renamed the Welland Recreational Waterway.

Recently, the city has seen the construction of a new Civic Centre, including the city hall and the public library downtown by the old canal.

Since the opening of the by-pass, Welland's east side has become a virtual island; separated from the rest of the Niagara Peninsula by the old canal channel to the west and by the by-pass channel to the east.
