= St. Lawrence Seaway Management Corporation =

Nonprofit corporation in Canada (established 1998)

Not-for-profit corporation overview
- Formed: 1998; 28 years ago
- Jurisdiction: Government of Canada
- Headquarters: Cornwall, Ontario
- Not-for-profit corporation executive: Demetrios (Jim) Athanasiou, President and CEO
- Website: https://www.GreatLakes-seaway.com

The St. Lawrence Seaway Management Corporation (SLSMC, French: Corporation de Gestion de la Voie Maritime du Saint-Laurent, CGVMSL), formerly known as the St. Lawrence Seaway Authority, is a nonprofit Canadian Corporation established in 1998 by the government of Canada, in partnership with Seaway users and other stakeholders, in order to ensure safe and efficient marine traffic. As dictated by the 1998 Canada Marine Act, the Corporation manages and operates the assets of the Crown entrusted to St. Lawrence Seaway, which consists of lands, Canals and 13 of the 15 locks between Montreal and Lake Erie, for the government under a long-term agreement with Transport Canada".

The corporation's activities include traffic management, navigation aids, safety, environmental programs, trade development, assets maintenance and renewal. The St. Lawrence Seaway Management Corporation caters to the needs of shipping interests, ports, marine agencies, and provincial and state jurisdictions.

The St. Lawrence Seaway Management Corporation head office is based in Cornwall, Ontario and has additional regional offices in Saint-Lambert, Quebec, and St. Catharines, Ontario, Canada.

== See also ==
- Saint Lawrence Seaway
- Great Lakes St. Lawrence Seaway Development Corporation - a counterpart entity from the United States.
- Transport Canada
- Federal Bridge Corporation - responsible for federal managed bridges on the Seaway that was formerly under control of the Saint Lawrence Seaway Management Corporation.
