= Townline Tunnel =

Tunnel in Welland, Ontario, Canada

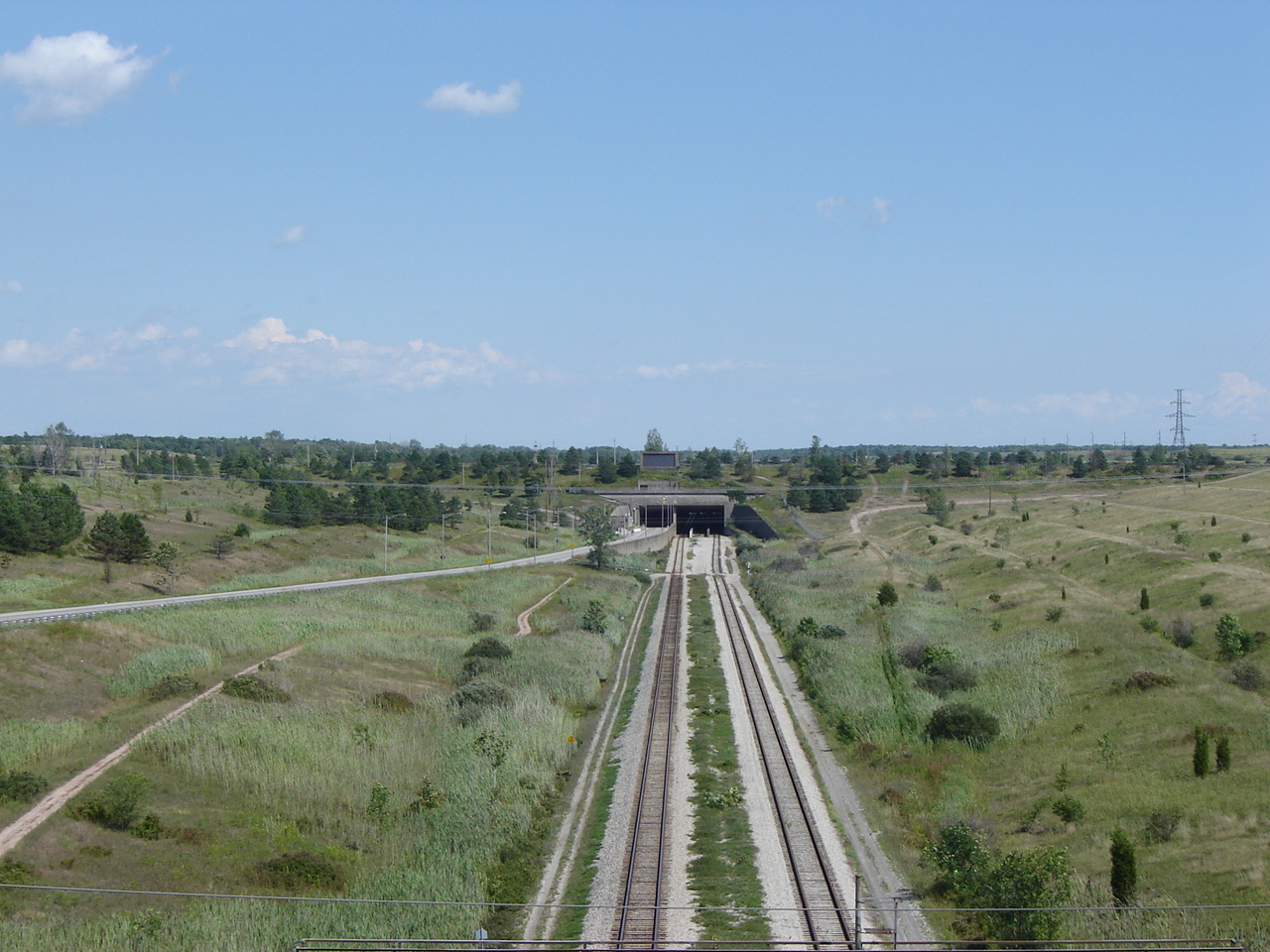
- The tunnel seen from the west
- Interactive map of Townline Tunnel

Overview
- Official name: Townline Tunnel
- Location: Welland Canal, Welland, Ontario
- Coordinates: 42.960537°N 79.229107°W
- System: Canadian Pacific Railway
- Route: Highway 58A

Operation
- Opened: July 13, 1972 for cars January 31, 1973 for trains
- Operator: Ministry of Transportation

Technical
- Length: 330 m (1,080 ft)
- No. of tracks: Double (only 1 used)
- No. of lanes: 2 lanes of traffic
- Width: 35 m (115 ft)

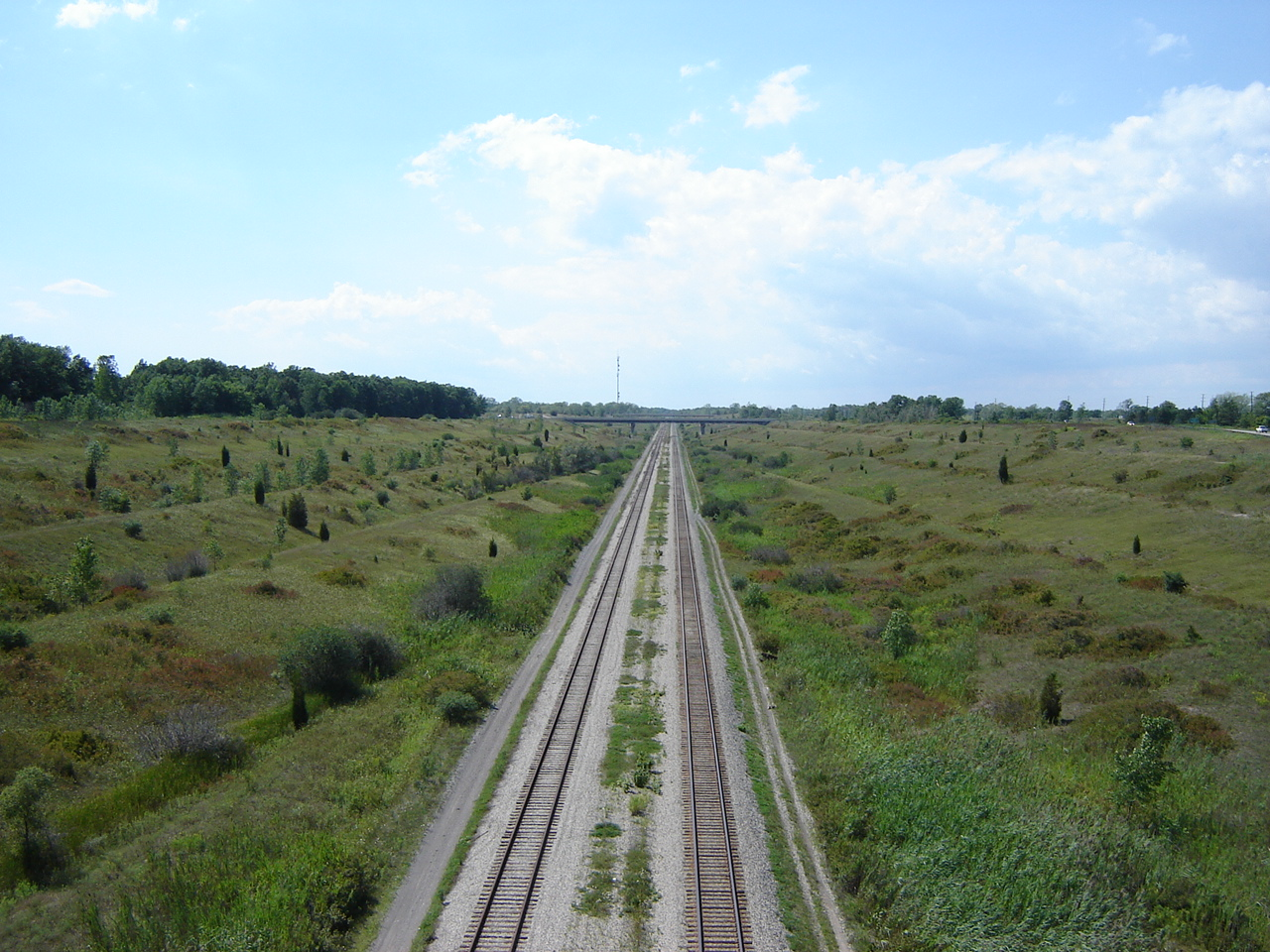
Length of tunnel approaches

The Townline Tunnel is an underwater tunnel in Welland, Ontario, Canada carrying Highway 58A as well as the Canadian Pacific Railway under the Welland Canal.

== The tunnel ==
The Townline Tunnel is a two-cell reinforced concrete tunnel with a rectangular cross-section. The roof is a post-tensioned concrete slab.

The tunnel was built as a part of the Welland By-Pass project. Its construction was relatively easy since, like the Main Street Tunnel, it was being built at the same time as the channel above it and a simple cut and cover method could be used.

The tunnel provides a sidewalk for pedestrians, two lanes for vehicular traffic, as well as room for three sets of tracks for rail vehicles. It was opened for automobiles on July 13, 1972, and the first train crossed the tunnel on January 31, 1973.

The tunnel is 330 metres (1083 ft) long and 35 metres (115 ft) wide. The low grade required for trains makes necessary that each approach to the tunnel stretch be 4 km (2.5 miles). There was removed about 13,750,000 cubic meters (18,000,000 cubic yards) of material and construction of three viaducts on each side of the canal. As well, a solid earth plug had to be put into the Welland Recreational Waterway (the old alignment of the canal), cutting it in two (satellite photo). The construction cost was $40 million. The middle rail line was removed in the 1990s and the two remaining tracks now serve as the CPR Hamilton Subdivision and the CPR Rusholme Storage Track. Townline Tunnel is known locally as the "Stinky Tunnel" due to the strong odor of rotten eggs as one passes through it. The distinct smell of hydrogen sulfide that is sometimes present in the tunnel is created by dissolving layers of gypsum which are present in the bedrock of the area.

== Issues with Flooding Control ==
Rain and snow falling on the approaches to the tunnel, as well as ground water flow, necessitate the operation of a pumping system to prevent flooding. Water is pumped via pipes located under the road and discharged into the canal. In February 1985, excessive runoff during a winter thaw caused flooding in the tunnel which closed the route to both rail and vehicular traffic. In late March, 2010, a routine inspection of the concrete pipes through which the water is pumped revealed erosion which threatened to cause a sinkhole within the road. The tunnel was closed to vehicular traffic to allow for repair. It re-opened April 22.
