= First Welland Canal =

First phase of construction of the Welland Canal, Upper Canada (1824–29, 1831–33)

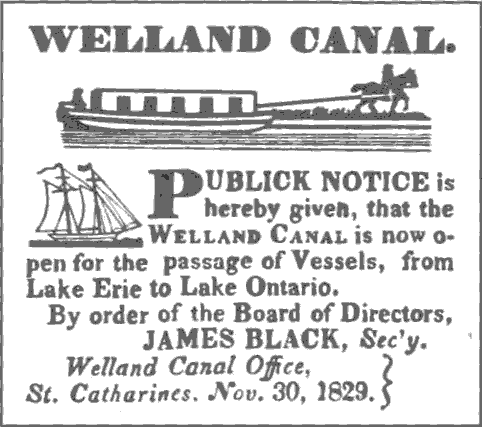
A public(k) notice in a newspaper announcing the opening of the canal

The Welland Canal has gone through many incarnations in its history. Today, five distinct canal-construction efforts are recognized. The retronym First Welland Canal is applied to the original canal, constructed from 1824 to 1829 and 1831 to 1833.

== Pre-canal times ==
The Great Lakes form an excellent navigation route into the interior of North America. Downstream from Niagara Falls, ships can reach the port city of Montreal without encountering major difficulties. Upstream, the lakes are navigable all the way to the western end of Lake Superior. Early on during the European settlement of North America, lack of other infrastructure made the Great Lakes the premier route to reach the interior of the continent, and later to ship materials and goods from the new frontiers.

The elevations of the Great Lakes, demonstrating the massive elevation difference across the Niagara River.

The Niagara Falls stood as a mighty barrier. To bypass it, a portage road between Queenston, Ontario and Chippawa was used, but the solution was far from optimal. The cargo had to be unloaded, carried 18 km up the Niagara Escarpment, then loaded onto different ships to continue on its way.

The relatively narrow Niagara Peninsula, situated between Lake Ontario and Lake Erie, was a natural match to the idea of bypassing the Falls. Indeed, the idea of a canal across the Peninsula was examined as early as 1799, when a group headed by Robert Hamilton, a Queenston merchant, unsuccessfully petitioned the Legislative Assembly of Upper Canada. Hamilton's plan called for a canal to be constructed between Fort Erie and, perhaps unsurprisingly, Queenston.

In 1816, a young man called William Hamilton Merritt bought a rundown sawmill on the Twelve Mile Creek, and added a grist mill and a store. The Twelve flowed from its source south of the Escarpment to Lake Ontario, but its water levels varied considerably, creating difficulties for Merritt and his mills. In 1818, when the flow was especially low, Merritt pursued the idea of bringing water to his mills from the Welland River.

On a bigger scale, the Erie Canal, dug from the Hudson River through northern New York, was about to reach Lake Erie. The impending completion meant the cargo from upper Great Lakes was about to head down the canal and Hudson River to New York City, bypassing its previous destination, Montreal. At the time, a considerable rivalry existed between Montreal and New York for cargo headed to Europe via ocean-going vessels. All of these factors contributed to the construction of the Welland Canal.

== Planning ==
In 1818, William Hamilton Merritt borrowed an instrument called a water level from Samuel Beckett, a mill owner in St. Johns. Along with George Keefer, John DeCew, and a couple of other neighbours he set out to survey a potential route for a water canal. From the headwaters of the Twelve Mile Creek near present-day Allanburg, they planned a line three kilometers south to meet with the Welland River. A ridge was encountered along the way, and using the instrument, the surveyors calculated it to be 10 metres high. It was actually double that height; the reason for the error is not known.

On July 4, 1818, Merritt organized a meeting in St. Catharines. The outcome was a petition sent to Upper Canada Legislature to provide for construction of a canal between the Twelve Mile Creek and Welland River. Unlike Merritt's original water-canal plan, the petition included plans for allowing boats to cross the Niagara Escarpment. In 1823, Hiram Tibbetts, an engineer, was employed to make a formal survey for the route. He suggested to dig a channel 1.2 metres (4 ft) below the surface level of Welland River between present-day Port Robinson and Allanburg, and then follow the Twelve Mile Creek northwest to DeCew's Falls (where John DeCew owned a mill). There, it was suggested to descend the escarpment by an incline railway and continue along the creek to Port Dalhousie to reach Lake Ontario.

On January 19, 1824, an act of the Legislature formed the Welland Canal Company, with a capitalization of $150,000 and Merritt as the financial agent. As part of his fundraising duties, he travelled extensively, including the United States and Great Britain.

Later in 1824, a revised route was put forward for the canal. It travelled from Port Robinson to Allanburg like the previous one, but from there went north and descended the escarpment by a series of canal locks in present-day Merritton. The canal then followed a local creek before joining the Twelve Mile and continuing on to Port Dalhousie. (With this new route, John Decew, one of the original canal proponents would become an opponent, when he realised that the new route would not only bypass his property, but divert water from his mill.)

== Construction ==
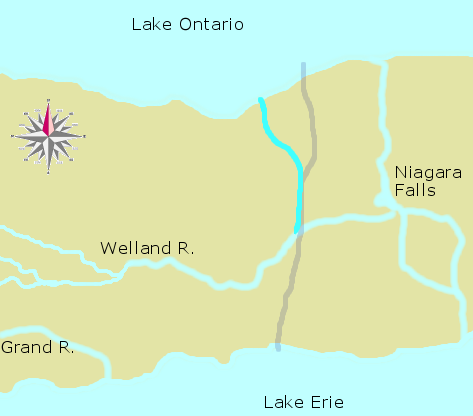
The Welland Canal as originally planned. The present-day canal is marked in pale grey

On November 30, 1824, approximately 200 people gathered near Allanburg to witness the sod-turning for the construction. Soon, contracts for the work were let out, but the actual construction didn't start until July 1825. Wherever possible, natural waterways were used, but this was not possible for the construction of the canal between Port Robinson and Allanburg. In what was called the Deep Cut, a channel over three kilometres long was cut, sometimes as deep as 20 metres. No less than 750,000 cubic metres of earth was removed.

Prior to the construction of the Welland Canal, the main settlements in the area were located along Lake Ontario and Niagara River, as the interior of the Niagara Peninsula remained hard to reach and rural areas, if that. As the construction progressed, however, shantytowns to house the labourers and their families were established along the way, giving birth to communities that later became Port Dalhousie, Merritton, Thorold, Allanburg and Port Robinson.

As the Deep Cut progressed, plans were being made for an alternate route to Lake Erie. The original motivation behind the canal was to bring water to mills, and this was met by constructing a canal to the Welland River. However, as the plans evolved to include a ship route, they were accommodated by simply following the Welland River until it emptied into the Niagara River. This was suboptimal for a number of reasons, the main one being the strong current of Niagara and the proximity of the towering Niagara Falls that made the journey hard and uncomfortable. Due to this, a second route was planned to diverge from the canal at Port Robinson. It would follow the Welland River southwest, then branch off, following Forks Creek and a 20 kilometre channel cut through present-day Wainfleet and the Wainfleet Marsh to reach Grand River and Lake Erie.

In September 1827, work on the Deep Cut was paused due to heavy rains. Many workers were transferred to construction of the canal in Wainfleet, and had made significant progress before Deep Cut work was resumed the following April.

However, the rains continued. On November 9, 1828, just two weeks' worth of work before completion of the Deep Cut, the banks of the cut near Port Robinson collapsed into the excavated channel, killing an unknown number of workers below. More landslides followed, and it soon became evident that making a cut deep enough as to use the Welland River as the source of canal water would not be possible. An alternate, sufficiently high source of water was necessary.

== Feeder Canal ==
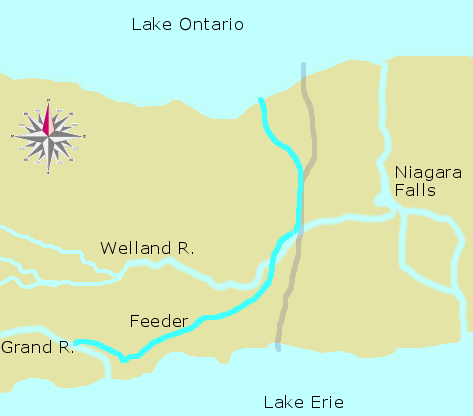
The Welland Canal including the Feeder Canal. The present-day canal is marked in pale grey

Since the construction of a channel towards Grand River was already underway at the time of the Deep Cut failure, a dam across the mouth of the Grand was proposed soon after, in December 1828. From there, a channel could be dug to feed this level to the Welland Canal proper. An aqueduct would be used to cross the Welland River.

The dam was relocated eight kilometres inland by naval authorities, mindful of its safety in times not long after the War of 1812. The settlement by the dam later evolved into present-day Dunnville. From there, the Feeder went southeast to Stromness, before turning northeast in a straight cut across the Wainfleet Marsh. The location chosen for the aqueduct across Welland River was not Port Robinson. Although the Welland Canal and River first met in Port Robinson, it was decided to dig the canal essentially parallel to the river for a couple of kilometres upstream before crossing it. The aqueducts of three subsequent canals were later built in the same spot.

Once again, many of the Deep Cut labourers were transferred to the Feeder cut. The digging was finished in the span of 177 days, which was a large achievement at the time. Lake Erie water was let into the Feeder and Welland Canals in November 1829.

As with other locations in the peninsula, shantytowns sprung up along the Feeder Canal. These later developed into places like Dunnville, Wainfleet and Welland, among others.

The Welland Canal was officially opened on November 30, 1829, exactly five years after the first turning of the sod. Two schooners, Annie and Jane from York, Upper Canada and R.H. Broughton from Youngstown, New York, left Port Dalhousie on Lake Ontario and arrived in Buffalo on the eastern end of Lake Erie two days later. Annie and Jane returned to Lake Ontario along the same route four days later.

== On to Lake Erie ==
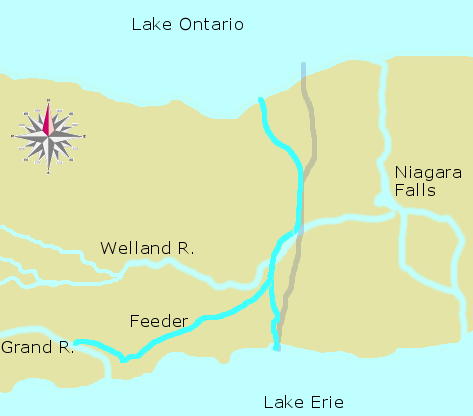
The complete First Welland Canal including the Feeder Canal and the extension to Port Colborne. The present-day canal is marked in pale grey

As mentioned before, the route to Lake Erie afforded by the canal, following the Welland and Niagara Rivers, was difficult and slow. The Feeder connected directly to Lake Erie, but it was long, and, not intended as a ship canal, of insufficient capacity. Over the course of the canal's first full navigation season in 1830, it became evident that a more direct route was necessary.

In March 1831, a location called Gravelly Bay (now Port Colborne) was chosen as the new Lake Erie terminus for the canal. It was one of the closest points on the Lake Erie shore, and also offered a natural harbour for the ships waiting to enter the canal. The new part of the canal was to run in a fairly straight line, except for a stretch where it followed a local ravine and a creek to minimise required excavation of hard rock in the area.

The Welland Canal Company obtained a loan of 50,000 pounds from the Province of Upper Canada. Construction started soon after, but it was delayed by rain, difficulty in clearing land, and a cholera outbreak in 1832. Neither the Wainfleet Marsh nor the rock south of it were easy to dig in, but work was accelerated during mild weather of late 1832 and early 1833.

On June 1, 1833, the schooner Matilda, headed for Cleveland from Oakville, became the first ship to travel through the new channel.

== Completion ==
Overall, the combined Welland and Feeder Canals stretched 44 kilometres (27 mi) between the two lakes, with 40 wooden locks. The minimum lock size was 33.5 m by 6.7 m (110 ft by 22 ft), with a minimum canal depth of 2.4 m (8 ft).

Today, very little of the First Canal is evident. Much of the Feeder Canal, however is still present today in Wainfleet township.
