= Air draft =

Distance from water to the highest point on a vessel or lowest point on a bridge span

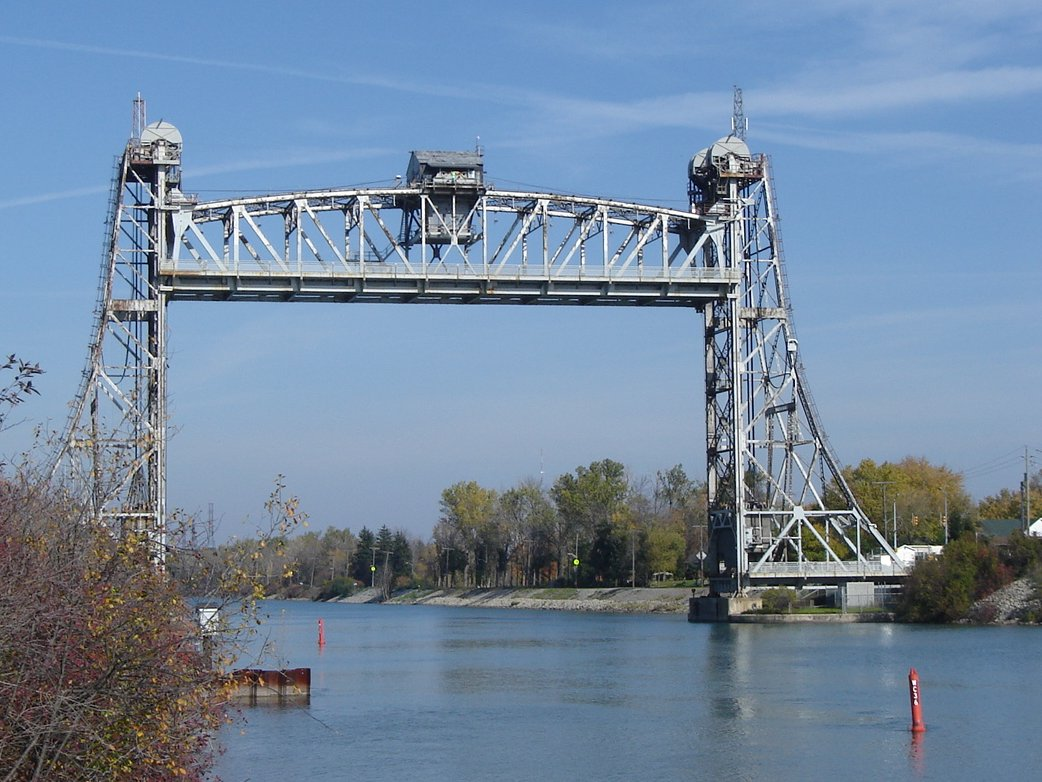
The deck of the Allanburg Bridge on Canada's Welland Canal typically rests only a few metres above the water level. When a ship approaches, the deck is raised to provide sufficient air draft (or draught) for the vessel to pass through. This bridge was involved in a collision with a lake freighter in 2001 as a result of lowering the span before the ship fully cleared the bridge.

Air draft (or air draught) is the vertical distance from the surface of the water to the highest point on a vessel. This is similar to the deep draft of a vessel which is measured from the surface of the water to the deepest part of the hull below the surface. However, air draft is expressed as a height (positive upward), while deep draft is expressed as a depth (positive downward).

== Clearance below ==
The vessel's clearance is the distance in excess of the air draft which allows a vessel to pass safely under a bridge or obstacle such as power lines, etc. A bridge's "clearance below" is most often noted on charts as measured from the surface of the water to the underside of the bridge at the chart datum Mean High Water (MHW), a less restrictive clearance than Mean Higher High Water (MHHW).

In 2014, the United States Coast Guard reported that 1.2% of the collisions that it had investigated in the recent past were bridge strikes caused by vessels attempting to pass under structures with insufficient clearance.

== Examples ==
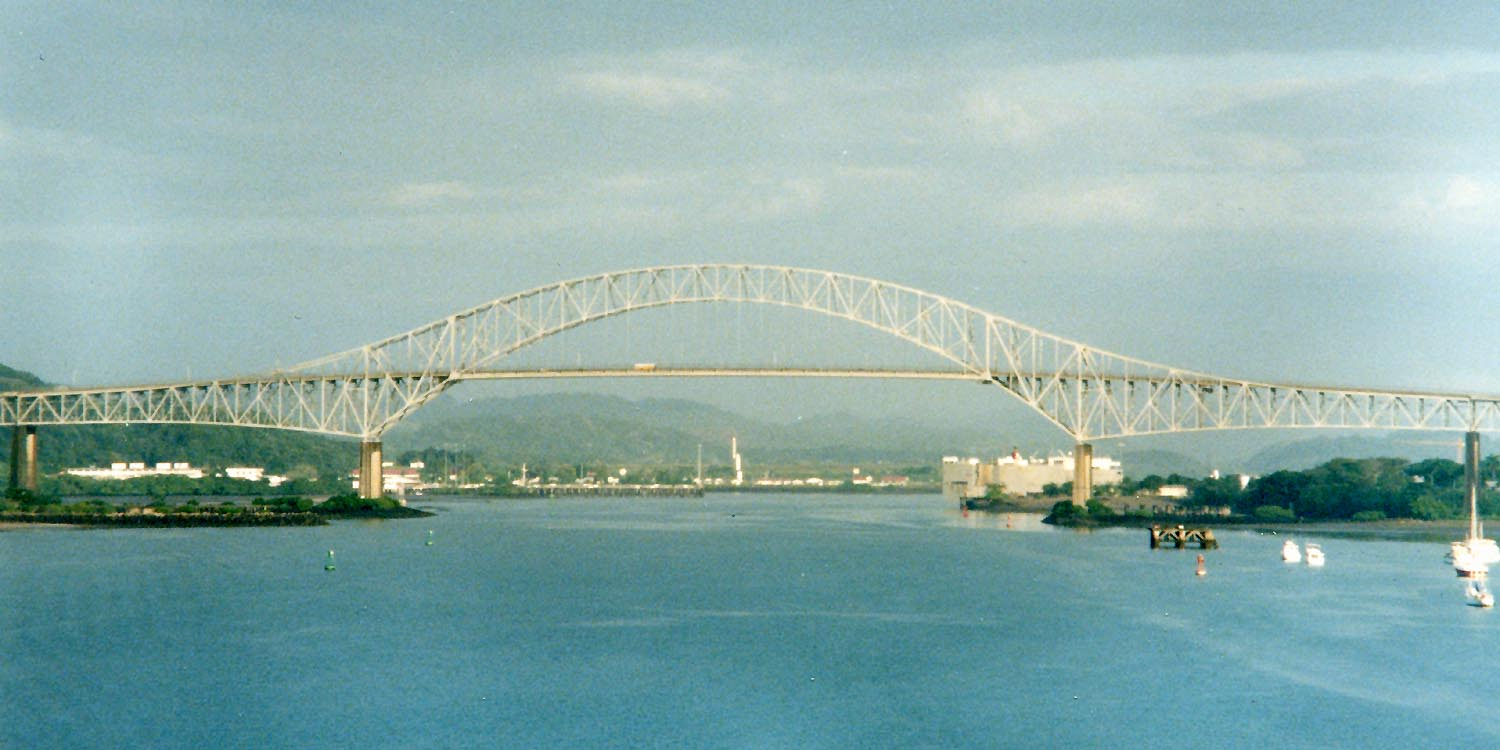
Bridge of the Americas

The Bridge of the Americas in Panama limits which ships can traverse the Panama Canal due to its height at 61.3 m (201 ft) above the water. The world's largest cruise ships, Oasis of the Seas, Allure of the Seas and the Harmony of the Seas will fit within the canal's new widened locks, but they are too tall to pass under the bridge, even at low tide (the two first ships are 72 m (236 ft), but do have lowerable funnels, enabling them to pass the 65-metre (213 ft) Great Belt Bridge in Denmark). New vessels are rarely built not clearing 65 m (213 ft), a height which accommodates all but the largest cruise and container ships.

The Suez Canal Bridge has a 70-metre (230 ft) clearance over the canal.

The Bayonne Bridge, an arch bridge connecting New Jersey with New York City, undertook a $1.7 billion modification to raise its roadbed to 66 m (217 ft).

== See also ==
- Structural clearance
- Structure gauge
- Tower Bridge
- Cargo ship size categories
- Chart datum
- Bridge strike
