= Windoc =

Windoc may refer to:

- Windoc (1899), a freighter that struck a bridge on the Welland Canal in 1938
- Windoc (1959), a freighter that struck a bridge on the Welland Canal in 2001
