= Welland Canal Bridge 11 =

Bridge 11 Allanburg Bridge
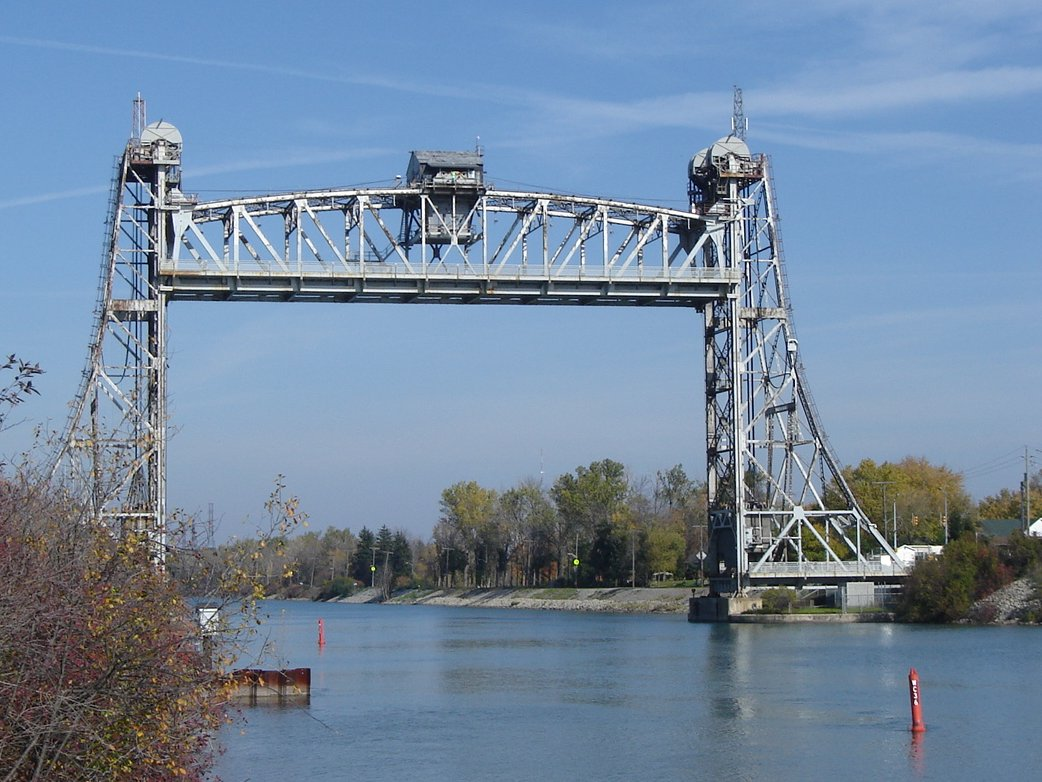
- The bridge with its lift span raised
- Coordinates: 43°04′35″N 79°12′38″W
- Carries: Motor vehicles
- Crosses: Welland Canal
- Locale: Allanburg, Ontario, Canada

Characteristics
- Longest span: 60.9 m (200 ft)
- Clearance below: 36.5 m (119.8 ft)

History
- Engineering design by: Harrington, Howard & Ash
- Construction start: 1930
- Construction end: 1930

Location
- Interactive map of Bridge 11

Bridge 11, also known as the Allanburg Bridge, is a vertical-lift bridge over the Welland Canal within the City of Thorold and community of Allanburg, Ontario, Canada. The location was used for the groundbreaking ceremony for the canal. It was constructed and completed in 1930. The bridge carries Hwy 20 connecting Niagara Falls to Fonthill.

The bridge has a 60.9-metre (200 ft) main span. It was designed by Harrington, Howard & Ash, the predecessor of HNTB. It was rehabilitated in 2001 and is a through-truss vertical-lift bridge with 36.5 m (119.8 ft) clearance for shipping.

On August 11, 2001, the bridge was struck by the MS Windoc (1959) when the lift span was lowered before the ship cleared the structure. The ship caught fire. After minor repairs to the bridge, it reopened to vehicular traffic on November 16, 2001.
