= Port Robinson, Ontario =

Port Robinson
- Unincorporated community
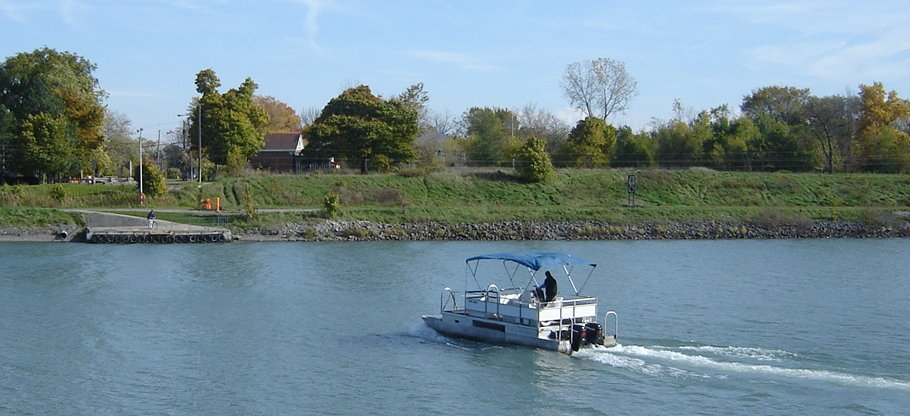
- The Port Robinson ferry approaches the east bank of the Welland Canal.
- Interactive map of Port Robinson
- Coordinates: 43°2′20″N 79°12′59″W
- Country: Canada
- Province: Ontario
- Regional municipality: Niagara
- City: Thorold
- Time zone: UTC-5 (EST)
  - Summer (DST): UTC-4 (EDT)
- Forward sortation area: L0S 1K0
- Area codes: 905 and 289
- NTS Map: 030M03
- GNBC Code: FCIAU

Port Robinson is a small community in the southernmost part of Thorold, Ontario, Canada. The community is divided in half by the Welland Canal, as there is no bridge in the immediate vicinity to connect the two halves of the community. In the summer, a small free ferry for pedestrians and cyclists runs across the canal. In the winter, residents must use the bridge on Highway 20, which results in a 13.3 km (8.3 mi) trip to get to the other side.

Like all the ports on the first Welland Canal, Port Robinson was named after a member of the Family Compact that once ruled Upper Canada, as Ontario was then named. Sir John Beverley Robinson was Attorney General of Upper Canada at the time the first Canal was built, and the port was originally named Port Beverley. The post office dates from 1835.

== The demise of Bridge 12 ==
Bridge St in Port Robinson was originally linked by a vertical lift bridge, numbered as Bridge 12 by the St. Lawrence Seaway Authority.

On August 25, 1974, the 600-foot (180 m) ore carrier Steelton, travelling northbound on the canal, struck and destroyed the bridge.

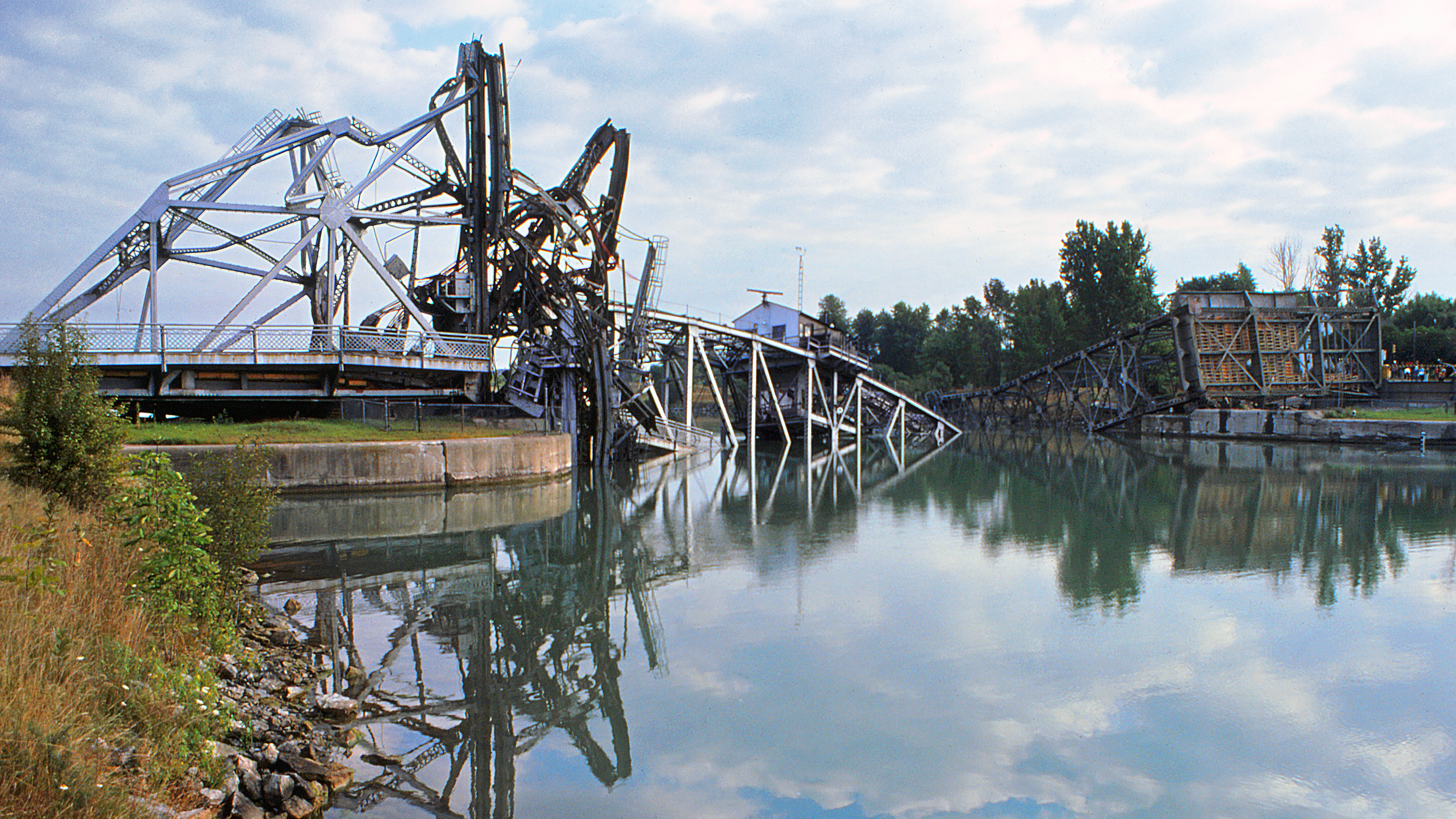

The east tower of the bridge toppled over, while the west tower collapsed in on itself. The bridge span was pushed into the water, severely deformed. The damage to the bridge was estimated as between $15 and $20 million. It was scrapped in its entirety. The removal of the towers from the canal, especially the counterweights (some 300 tons each), necessitated the use of a special heavy-duty floating crane. The canal was closed until September 9 for the repairs.

The Steelton suffered damage to its bow and pilot house, estimated at $1 million. The repairs were made at Port Colborne, at the southern terminus of the Welland Canal.

There was no loss of life. The bridge master, Albert Beaver, and a watchman on the ship suffered minor injuries.

The ensuing investigation concluded that the ship failed to blow the whistle to signal its approach and the bridge could not be raised in time.

After the accident, rebuilding the bridge or building a tunnel to replace it was considered. In the end, it was concluded that the volume of local vehicular traffic was not sufficient to warrant such an expense. Instead, a passenger ferry service was launched in early 1977. The ferry can transport people and bicycles, but is not big enough for cars, thus forcing residents who want to use a car to take the long route. In 2015, amid debate about discontinuing the ferry, it was estimated that the ferry carries 2000 pedestrians and 6000 touring cyclists per year.

A similar accident occurred at Bridge 11 in Allanburg in 2001. That bridge was lowered onto the passing bulk carrier Windoc, which afterwards caught fire. The ship was a total loss, but no injuries were reported, and Bridge 11 suffered minor damage and was repaired. While repairs were underway, Port Robinson residents wishing to travel by car to other side of the community had to drive even farther than usual to use the Main Street Tunnel in Welland.

Aftermath of Welland Canal Bridge 12 Collision

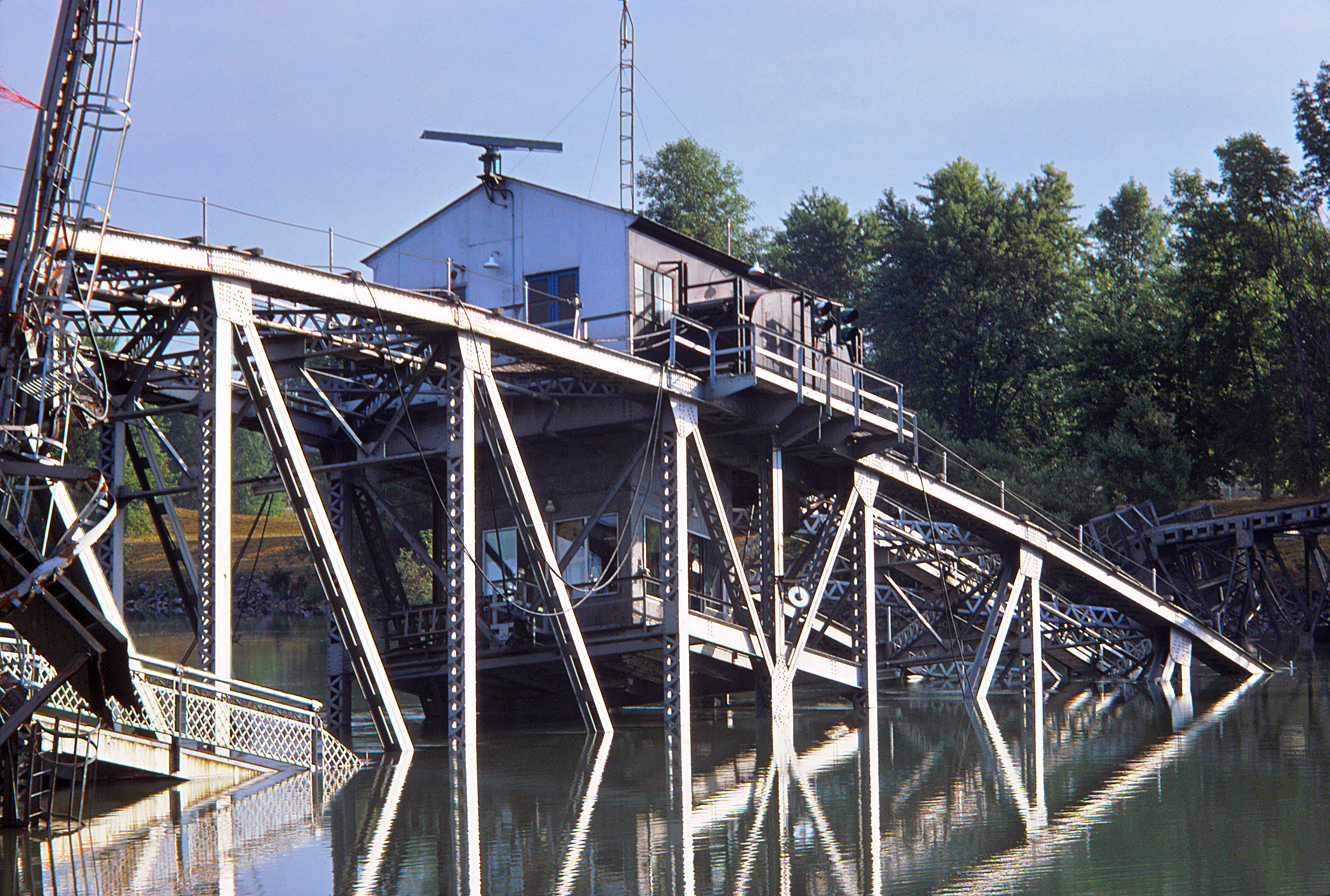
1

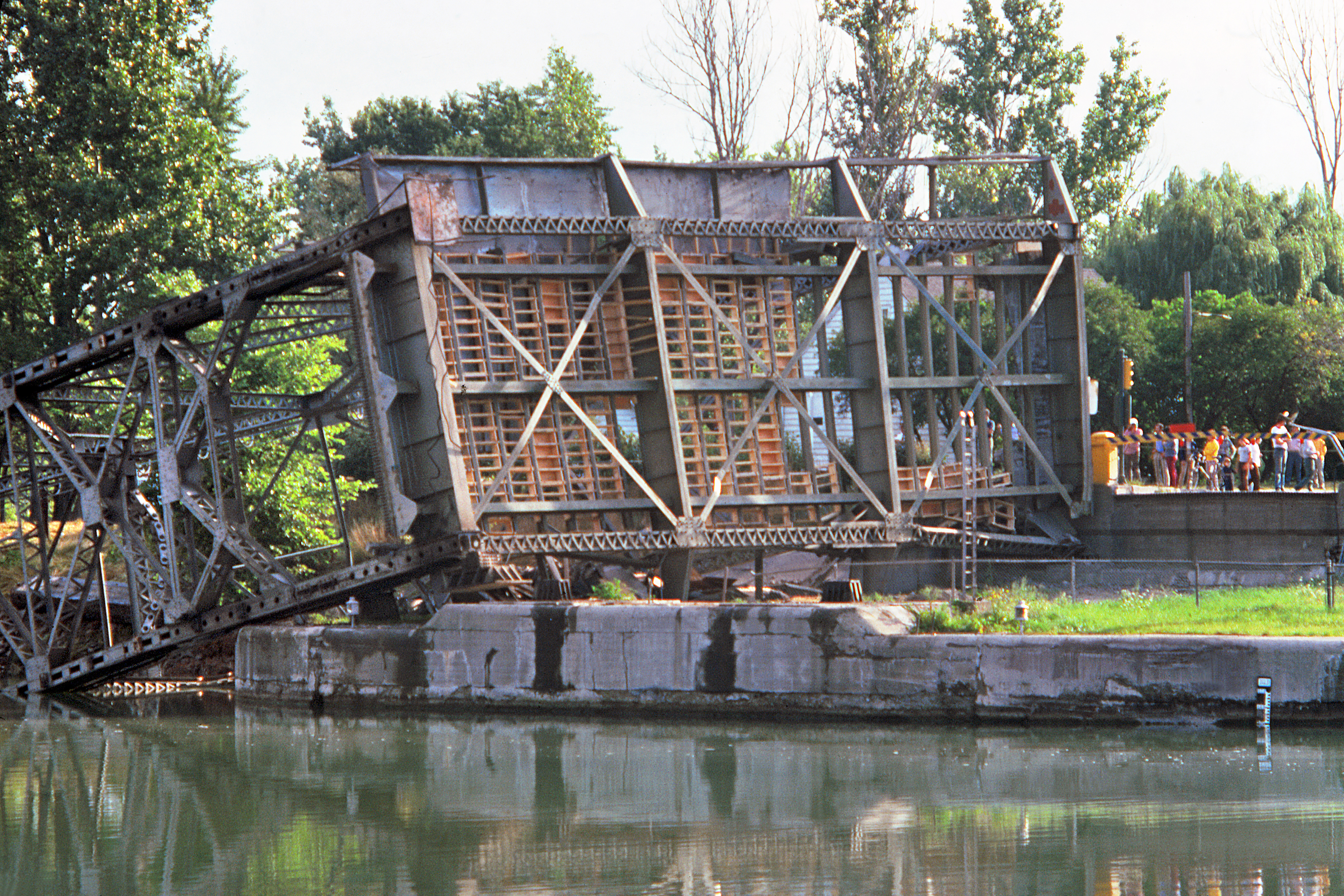
2

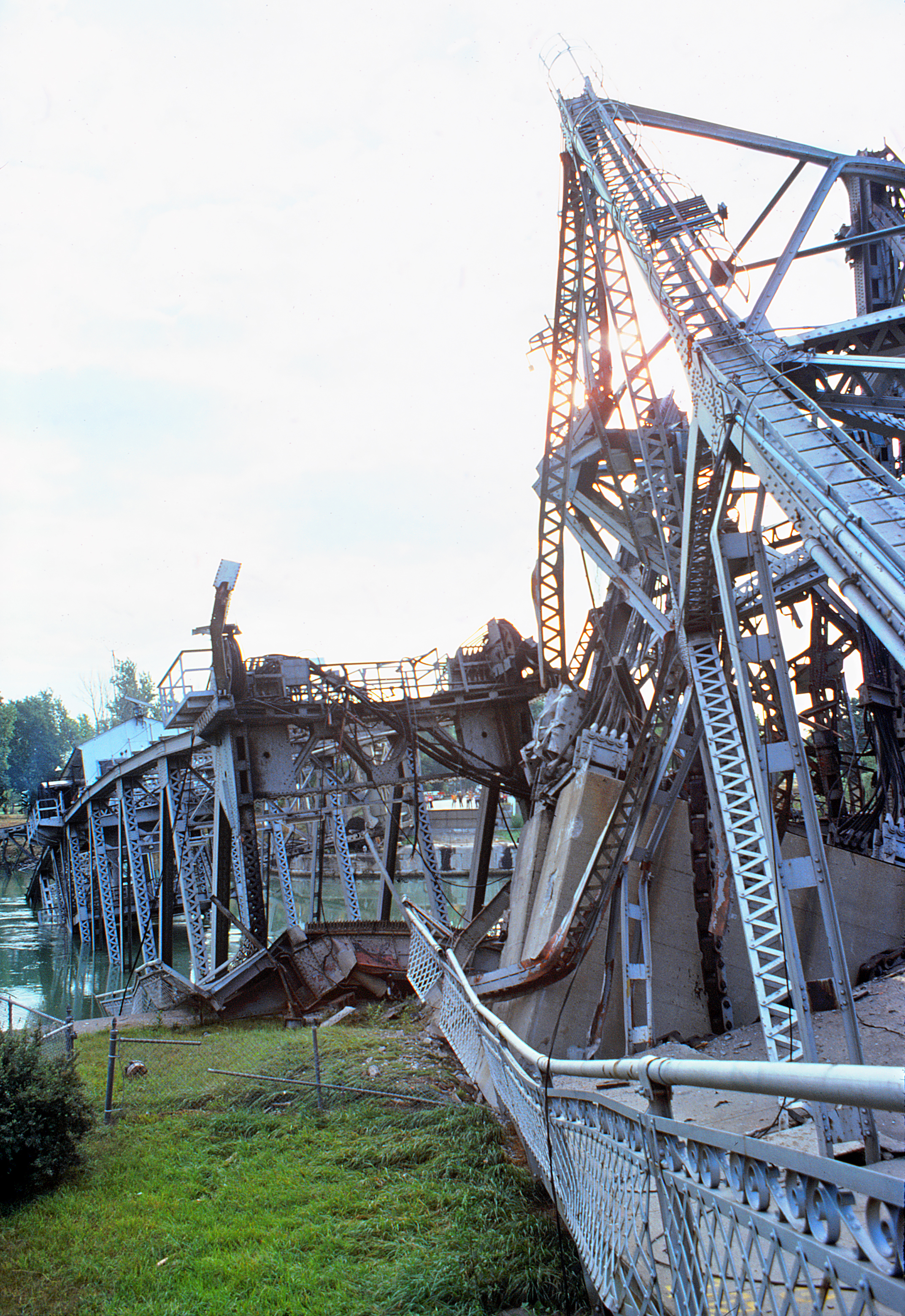
3

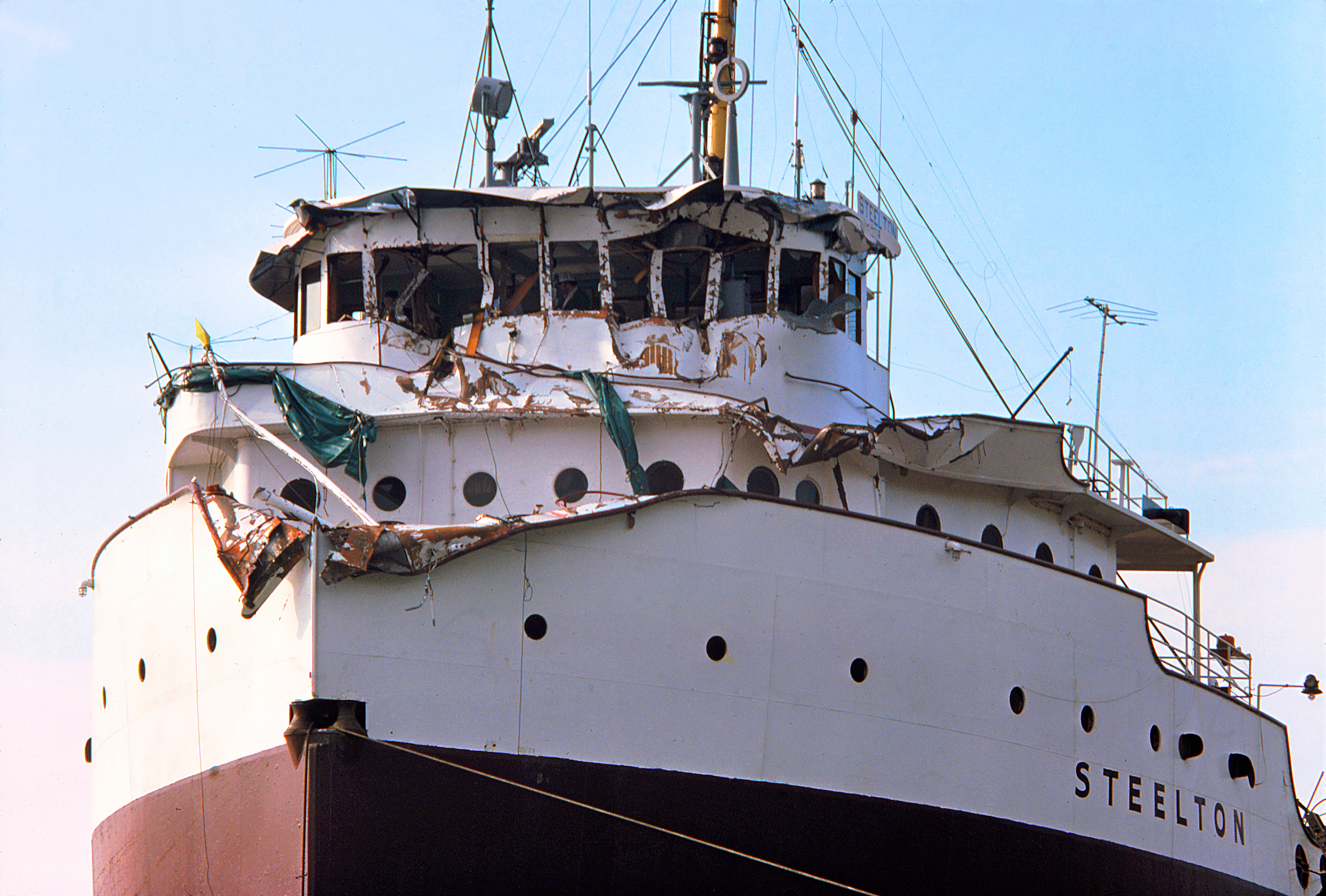
4

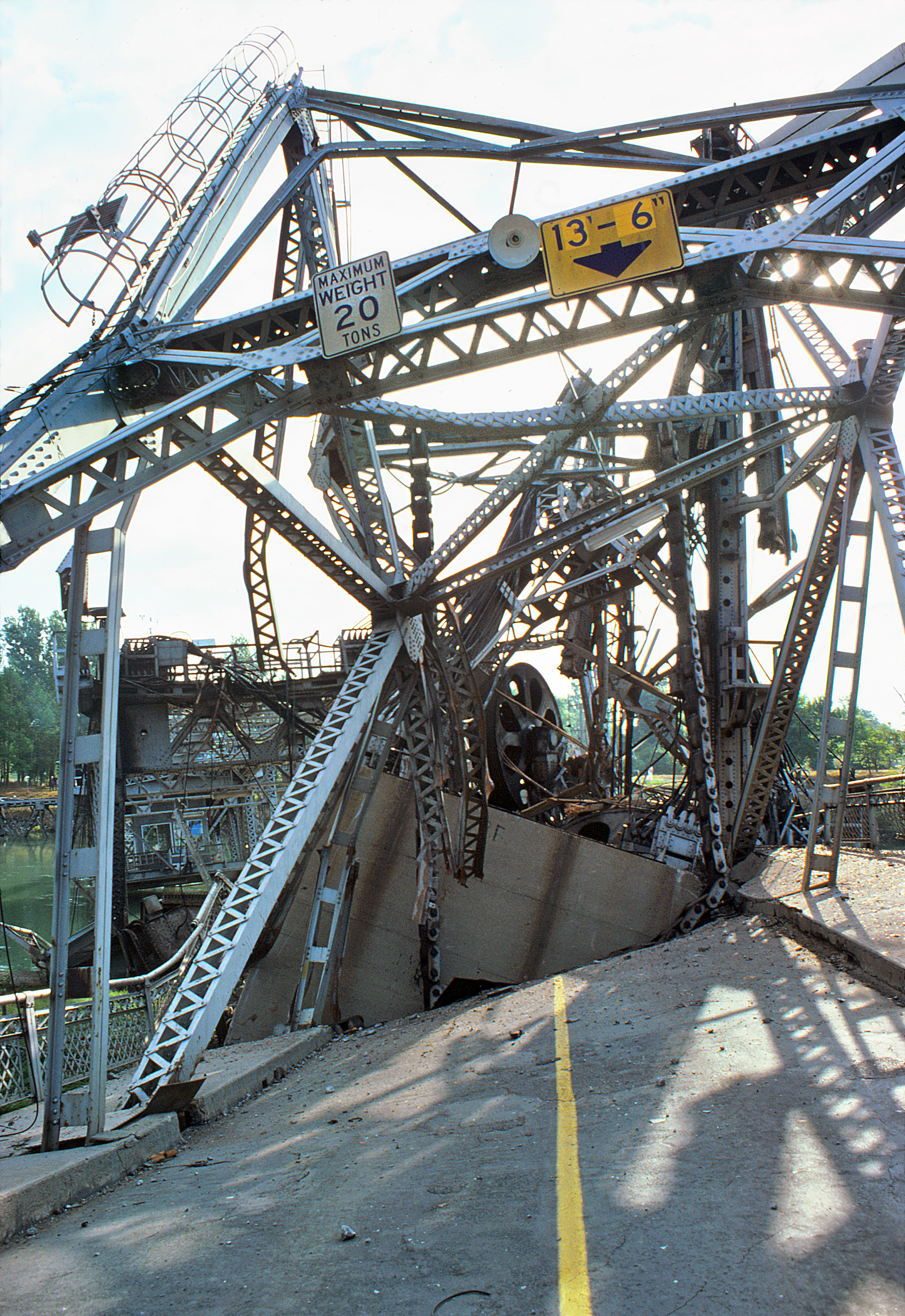
5

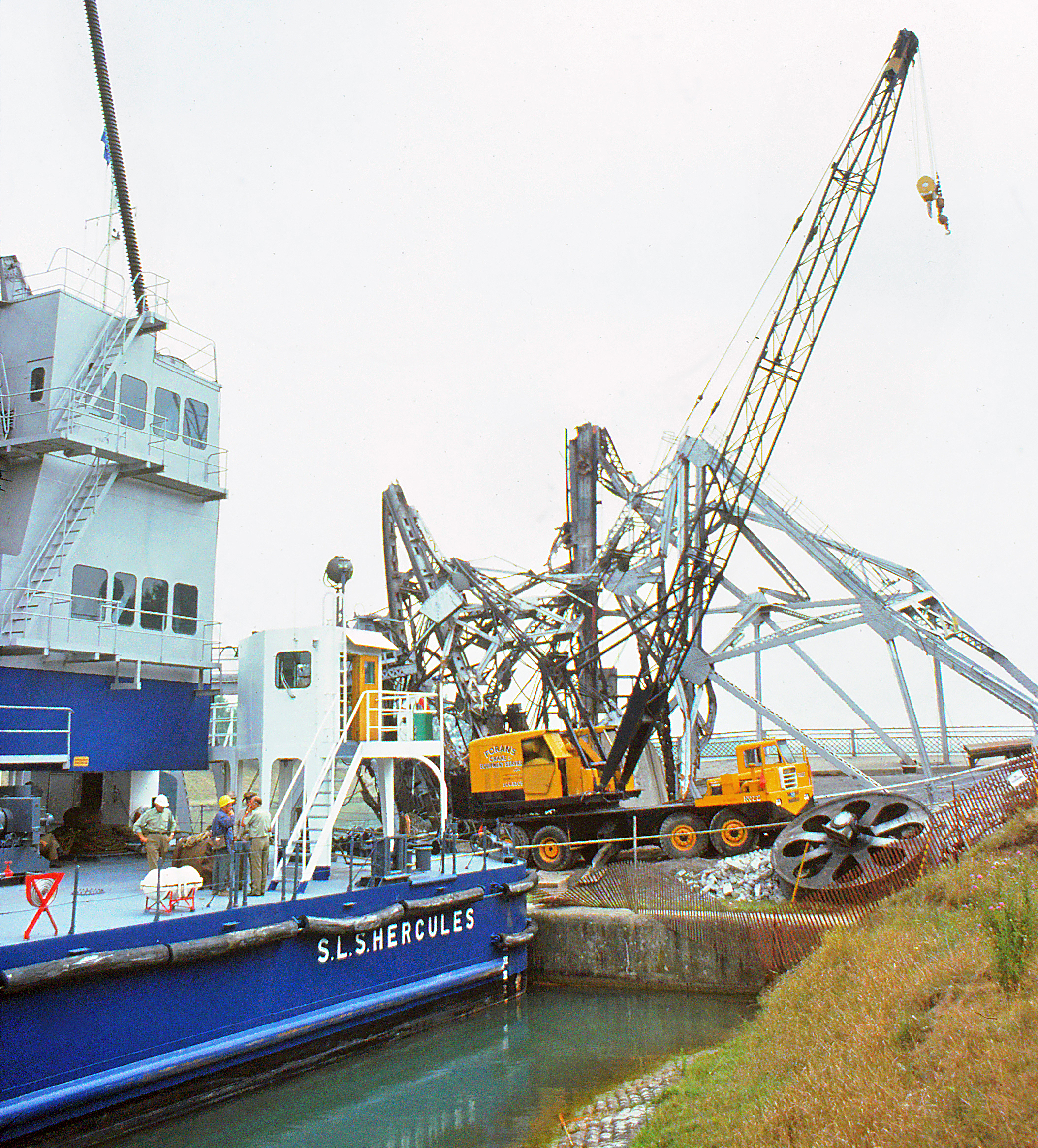
6
