= SS Hydrus =

Two merchant steamships have been named SS Hydrus:

- SS Hydrus (1899), later Windoc, lake freighter, scrapped in 1968.
- SS Hydrus (1903), lake freighter, sank in 1913.
