= Clarence Street Bridge =

Bridge in Port Colborne, Ontario, Canada

Coordinates: 42.8864°N 79.2486°W

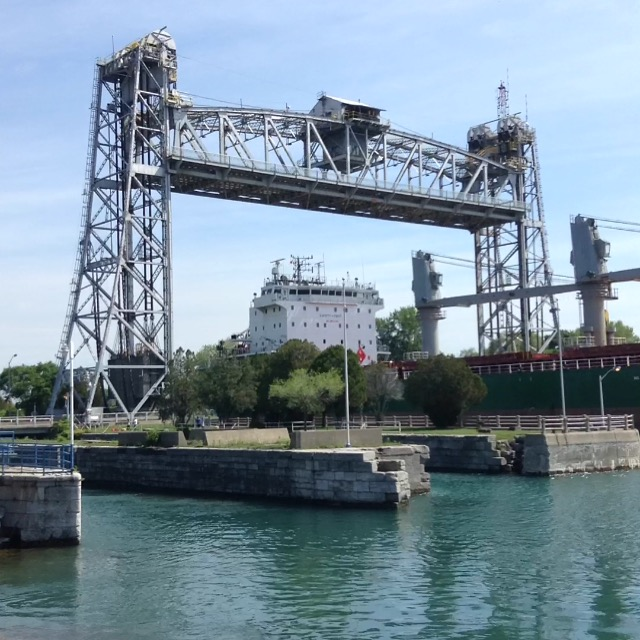
Vessel known as Eiden passing beneath the Lift Bridge

The Clarence Street Bridge (also known as Bridge 21) is a vertical-lift bridge located in Port Colborne, Ontario. Built between 1927–1929 during 4th Welland Canal Construction, the bridge still serves today as a vital link connecting East and West Port Colborne. The structure uses simple electric motors and counterweights to raise the deck 36.5 meters (120ft.) above passing vessels. The raising and lowering of the bridge takes approximately 90 seconds. The western bridge approach, over former canal locks 26 and 27, was added when Bridge 21 was constructed, making these locks inoperable.

This bridge is one of only four remaining vertical-lift road bridges over the Welland Canal.

Another vertical-lift bridge (known as Bridge 20) stood just north of Bridge 21; it was also built in 1927–1929 by the Canadian National Railway. In the mid-1990s, the Port Colborne Harbour Railway was completed, connecting Port Colborne to rail lines on the western side of the canal, making Bridge 20 unnecessary. It was removed in the winter of 1997.

Clarence Street Bridge Lifting

On April 16th, 2026, a heavy lift vessel, BBC Tokyo, collided with the bridge while transiting the canal. Online videos show the vessel approaching the bridge at an odd angle, then brushing against the east tower. The cause of the incident is under investigation. As of May 2026, ship traffic has resumed.
