= Merritton Tunnel =

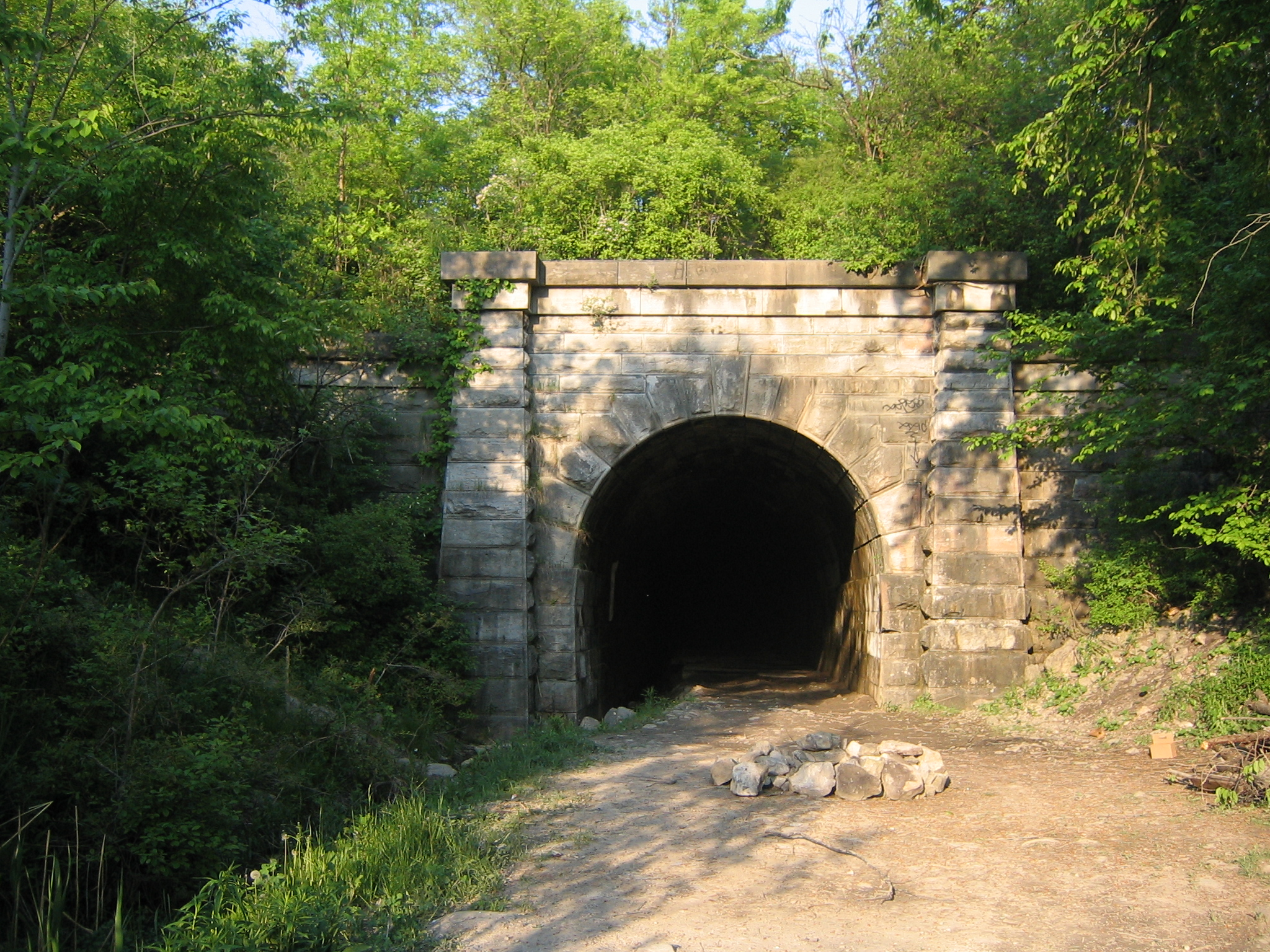
- The tunnel entrance in 2006, prior to being walled
- Interactive map of Merritton Tunnel

Overview
- Other names: Blue Ghost Tunnel; Grand Trunk Railway Tunnel
- Line: Grand Trunk Railway
- Status: Abandoned
- Crosses: Third Welland Canal
- Start: Merritton
- End: Thorold

Operation
- Constructed: 1875-1876
- Opened: 1876
- Closed: 1915

Technical
- Length: 713 ft (217 m)

The Merritton Tunnel, also known as the Blue Ghost Tunnel and the Grand Trunk Railway Tunnel, is an abandoned railway tunnel in Thorold, Ontario. The decision to build the tunnel came from the need for a more durable and less interrupted way to cross the new canal situated directly above it via vehicles. Constructed in 1875, Completed in 1876, and Opened in 1881. The tunnel is located between locks 18 and 19 of the former third Welland Canal and was built using Queenston limestone, spanning a total length of 713 feet when including the winged stone work at either end. Hundreds of men armed with picks and shovels, as well as several horses were used in the excavation of the tunnel. The tunnel was used periodically until 1915, when Harry Eastwood was the last official engineer to pilot a train through the tunnel. Following that, the tunnel was used only occasionally by farmers to transport cattle or as a safe passage from the weather.

== Accidents ==
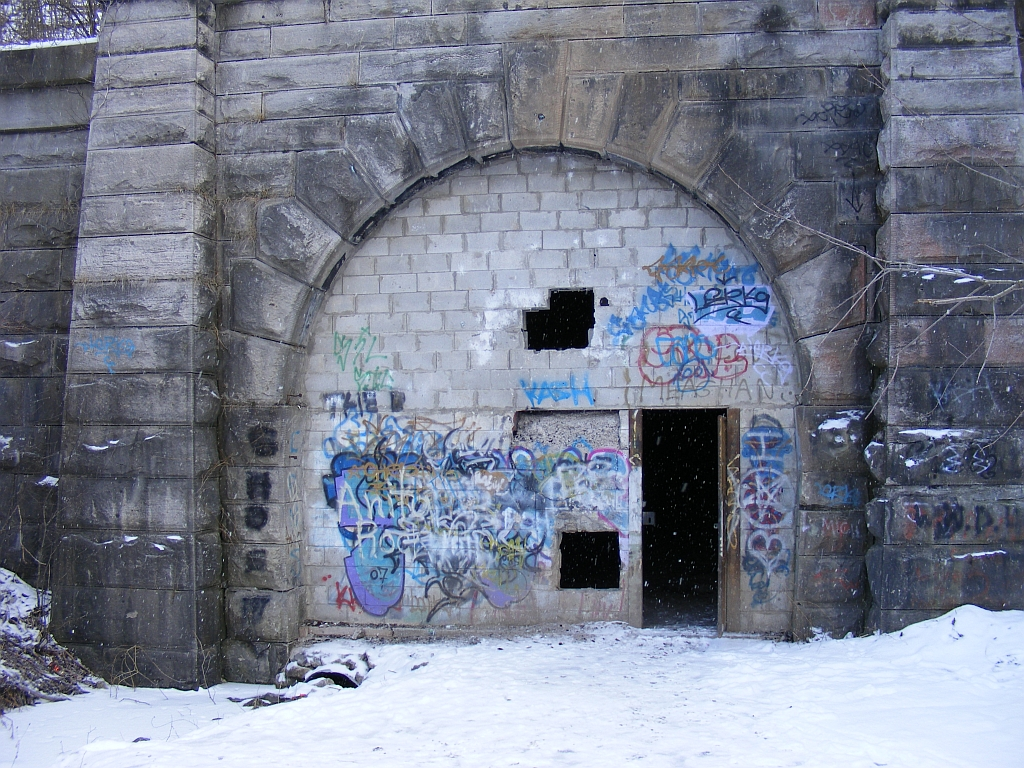
The tunnel in 2007, after being sealed

Several fatal accidents occurred during the construction and use of the tunnel and the railway running through it. In 1875, a 14-year-old was killed when he was crushed under a large rock. On January 3, 1903 at 7:03 AM, Engine Number 4 and Engine Number 975 met in a head-on collision approximately a third of a mile from the western entrance of the tunnel. The trains were moving at approximately 22 miles per hour when they crashed, and the firemen of both trains, Charles Horning of Engine Number 4 and Abraham Desult from Engine Number 975, died as a result of their injuries. In total, 107 men were killed between the railway accident, the construction of the tunnel, and the canal in its surrounding area.
