= Allanburg, Ontario =

Allanburg
- Unincorporated community
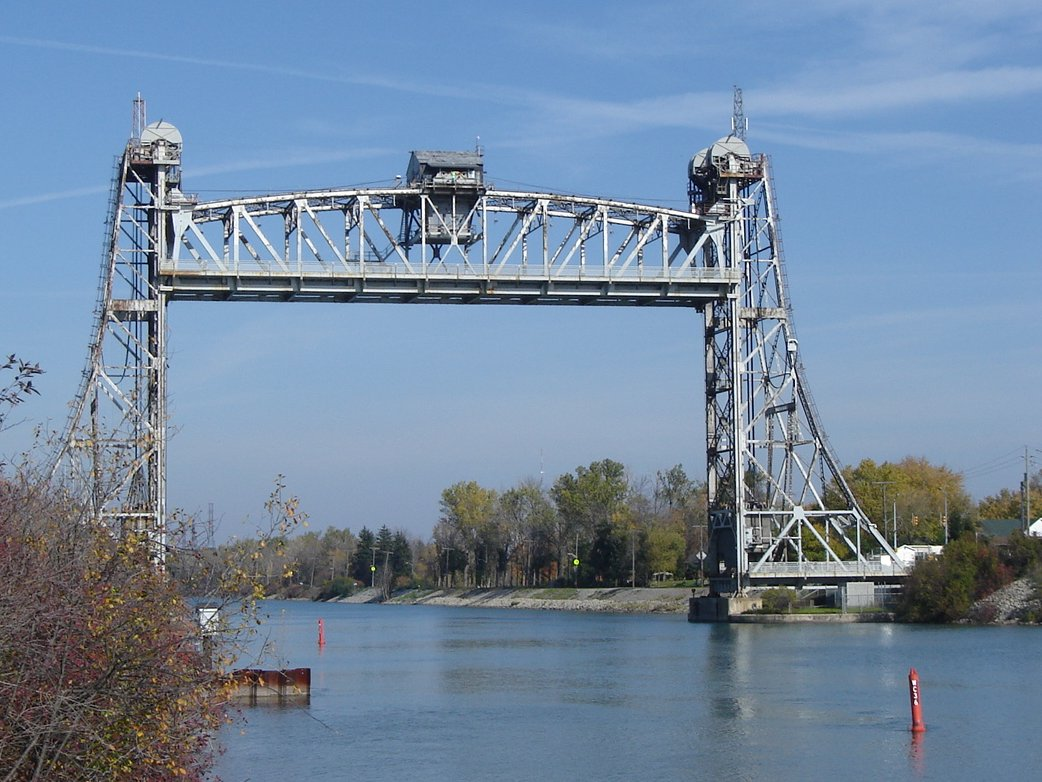
- The lift bridge in Allanburg
- Interactive map of Allanburg
- Coordinates: 43°4′35″N 79°12′30″W
- Country: Canada
- Province: Ontario
- Regional municipality: Niagara
- City: Thorold
- Time zone: UTC-5 (EST)
  - Summer (DST): UTC-4 (EDT)
- Forward sortation area: L0S 1A0
- Area codes: 905 and 289
- NTS Map: 030M03
- GNBC Code: FEDES

Allanburg is a community within the City of Thorold, Ontario, Canada. It is located on the Welland Canal and Highway 20, both important transportation routes through the Niagara Peninsula. The two cross at a vertical-lift bridge, numbered as Bridge 11 by the Saint Lawrence Seaway Authority, but often known simply as the Allanburg Bridge. The collision of the ship Windoc with the bridge made national news in 2001.

== Inception of the Welland Canal ==
The original sod-turning ceremony for the construction of the First Welland Canal took place in the area on November 30, 1824. Today, a cairn at the west approach to the lift bridge commemorates the event.

== Windoc incident ==
At approximately 20:54 on August 11, 2001, the bulk carrier vessel Windoc struck the descending Allanburg lift bridge. The ship's wheelhouse and funnel were ripped off in the collision, starting a fire on board. Uncontrollable, the vessel drifted downstream and ran aground 800 m from the bridge. Fire fighting units from throughout Niagara Region were involved in the efforts to put out the fire, parking the fire trucks on the canal's banks.

There was no loss of life. The master and third officer were able to escape the wheelhouse before its destruction. The wheelsman remained in the wheelhouse and survived the collision by lying on the deck until the bridge span passed overhead. The canal reopened to shipping two days later, but the bridge remained locked in a raised position while engineers studied and repaired the structure. Road traffic through central Niagara was left in considerable chaos, as the number of canal crossings is limited. Detours were set up to travel through the Thorold Tunnel north of Allanburg. Eventually, the damage to the bridge was found to be minor and repaired. Windoc has sat in the port of Montreal ever since, inoperable and its bilges flooded. Later, an investigation found that the impaired bridge operator lowered the bridge before the ship had cleared the span.

== See also ==
- Port Robinson, Ontario, site of a similar bridge collision on the Welland Canal
