= Merritton =

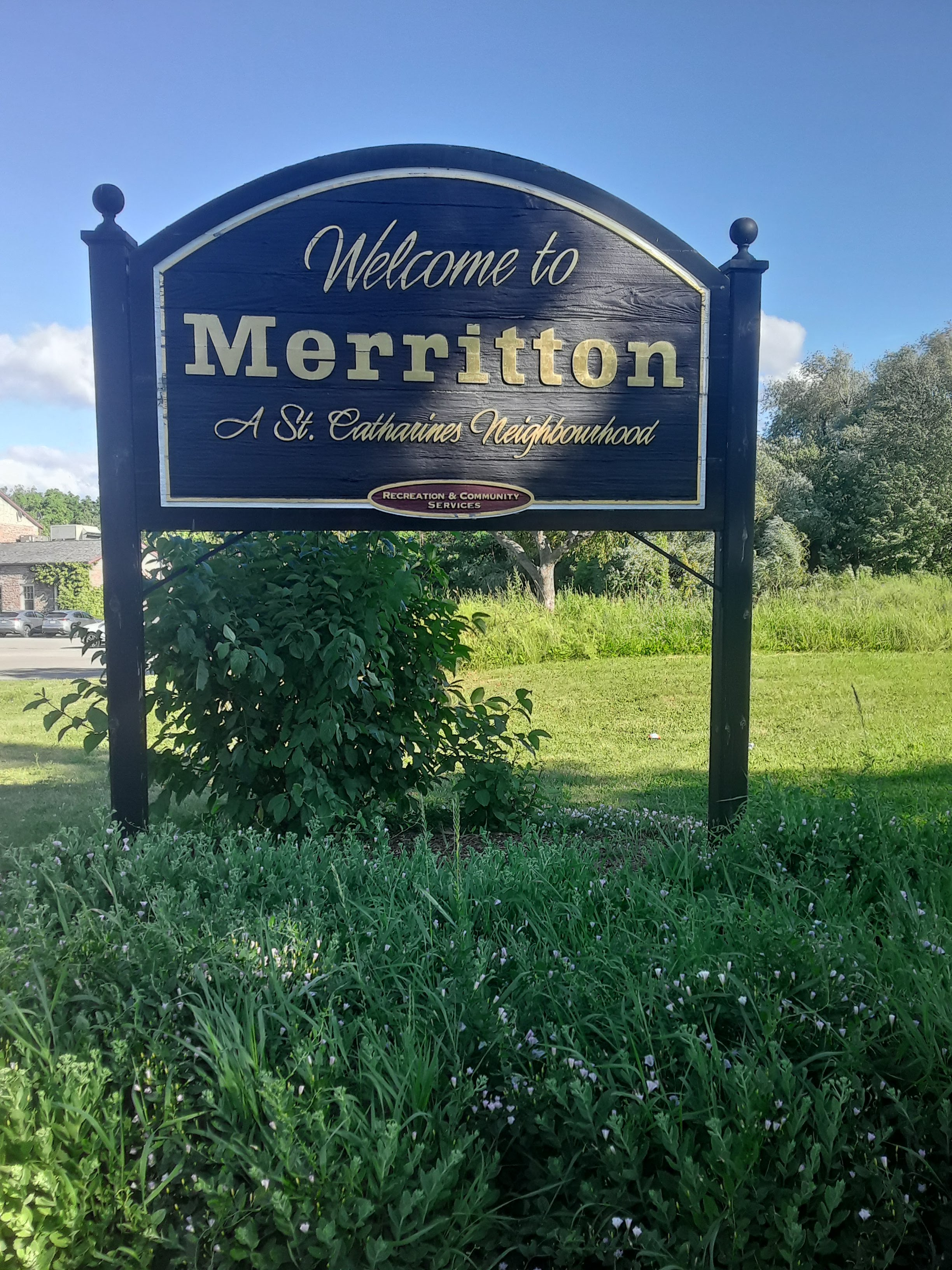
A sign used for the current-day Merritton neighbourhood

Merritton is both a distinct community within and a council ward of St. Catharines, Ontario, Canada. It was named after William Hamilton Merritt, a prominent local entrepreneur and founder of the Welland Canal Company. Until 1858, Merritton was named Welland City, but exchanged names that year with Merrittsville (Today's Welland City), when that town became the "seat" of Welland county.

Merritton was also previously known as Slabtown and Centreville. It became part of the city of St. Catharines in 1961. Prior to amalgamation which saw the original city of St. Catharines absorb several satellite towns, Merritton was a separate entity (along with Port Dalhousie). This led to the population of St. Catharines becoming more than twice as large. Merritton has had an ice hockey exchange program with the Wissahickon Skating Club since 1964. The original town hall, on Merritt St., once the City of St. Catharines Museum, is now home to the St. Catharines Senior's Centre.

As a former industrial centre on the Welland Canal, Merritton contains various heritage sites. Among them are the Merritton Tunnel (under the third Welland Canal), remnants of the three previous Welland Canals and several early industrial ruins including the former Independent Rubber Company / Merritton Cotton Mills Annex and the old Lybster Mill building, which was built in 1860. The area has undergone a major infrastructure facelift involving the re-alignment of Glendale Avenue, the replacement of the Merritt Street Bridge. A new fire hall was built in 2013. Merritton is also experiencing a significant increase in residential construction, especially on property designated as brownfield by the city.

== See also ==
- Merritton Tunnel
