= Ontario Highway 20 =

Ontario provincial highway

Highway 20
- Lundy's Lane, Centennial Parkway
- A map of Highway 20; Highway 20 Sections downloaded in 1998

Route information
- Maintained by the Ministry of Transportation
- Length: 1.9 km (1.2 mi)
- Existed: March 12, 1930,–present

Major junctions
- West end: Highway 58 near Allanburg
- East end: Regional Road 70 (Townline Road) – Niagara Falls

Location
- Country: Canada
- Province: Ontario
- Major cities: Thorold, Niagara Falls

Highway system
- Ontario provincial highways; Current; Former; 400-series
← Highway 19	→ Highway 21

King's Highway 20, commonly referred to as Highway 20 or Lundy's Lane in Niagara Falls, is a provincially maintained highway in the Canadian province of Ontario. Presently, it is a short 1.9 km (1.2 mi) stub between Highway 58 and Niagara Regional Road 70 in the City of Thorold, but until 1997 it connected Hamilton to Niagara Falls, serving several towns atop the Niagara Escarpment en route, the former portion in what was then the former city of Stoney Creek in the former Regional Municipality of Hamilton–Wentworth as Centennial Parkway

Highway 20 was first designated in 1930, serving as a bypass to the congested Highway 8. Soon after, a new cut was made into the Niagara Escarpment south of Stoney Creek, which would serve Highway 20 for 66 years. However, the new route failed to divert a significant amount of traffic from Highway 8. Subsequently, the Queen Elizabeth Way (QEW) was constructed through the Niagara Peninsula between 1937 and 1940. The opening of the Burlington Bay Skyway in 1958 bypassed the routing of Highway 20; it was truncated at the QEW in Stoney Creek in 1964 as a result. The routing remained unchanged between then and 1998, when all but a short stub of the highway was transferred to regional jurisdiction.

== Route description ==
While today Highway 20 is a mere 1.9-kilometre (1.2 mi) stub of its former length, most of the former route retains the same layout and character as the highway did prior to 1998, serving as the main street of the villages of Fonthill and Smithville. At Allanburg, Highway 20 crossed the Welland Canal utilizing the Allanburg Bridge, or Bridge 11, a vertical lift bridge which opened to traffic in the spring of 1930 shortly after Highway 20 was first opened. The remaining portion of the highway is mostly rural in nature, although numerous motels line the short stretch of roadway, reminiscent of a bygone era.

Highway 20 begins at a signalized intersection with Highway 58, which proceeds north and west from there. Moving eastward, a majority of motels line the south side of the highway, as do several residences and a strip club. At Thorold Townline Road (Regional Road 70), Highway 20 ends while the roadway continues eastward into the city of Niagara Falls as Lundy's Lane, named for William Lundy (1741–1829), a United Empire Loyalist from Berks County.

=== Former route (1997) ===
Prior to being transferred almost entirely in 1997 and 1998, Highway 20 provided an alternative route to Highway 8 and the QEW south of the Niagara Escarpment. Beginning at an interchange with the QEW at Centennial Parkway, the highway travelled south, providing access to communities within Stoney Creek. After intersecting Highway 8 (Queenston Road), it ascended the Niagara Escarpment. At Elfrida, Highway 20 intersected Highway 53, which travelled west to Brantford, as well as Highway 56, which travelled south to Binbrook and Highway 3; Highway 20 turned east at this intersection.

The route exited Hamilton–Wentworth at Westbrook Road, entering the Region of Niagara and the municipality of West Lincoln after a brief swerve southward. It passed through the communities of Fulton, Kimbo and Allen's Corners before curving southeast into the town of Smithville. Southeast of the town, it curved south near St. Anns to Bismarck, where traffic had to turn to remain on the highway, which switched from a southward to eastward direction. At Niagara Regional Road 24 (Victoria Avenue), the route entered the town of Pelham. It served as the primary east–west route through the community of Fonthill, where it curved northeast.

After meeting Highway 406 and Highway 58 (then an at-grade two-lane intersection), Highway 20 curved east to cross the Welland Canal. Now known as Lundy's Lane, it swerved north before meeting the present portion of the route. East of the Thorold–Niagara Falls boundary at Niagara Regional Road 70, the highway zig-zagged northeast into the urban area of Niagara Falls. Provincial maintenance ended at Montrose Road prior to 1998, with it continuing east as a Connecting Link. It crossed the QEW before becoming known as Ferry Street at the intersection with Main Street. As it approached the tourist district, it curved northeast and became Victoria Avenue. It turned down Clifton Hill and then north onto Falls Avenue, ending at the Rainbow Bridge.

== History ==
Soon after designating Highway 20, the Department of Highways constructed the Stoney Creek Cut, providing a low-grade ascent of the Niagara Escarpment.

Highway 20 was first designated on March 12, 1930, with its western terminus at the intersection of Highway 8 (Main Street) and Highway 6 (John Street) in downtown Hamilton. It proceeded south along John Street, concurrently with Highway 6, to the foot of the Niagara Escarpment, where the two routes split. Highway 20 climbed the escarpment through the Jolley Cut, while Highway 6 used the Claremont Access. At the top, Highway 20 proceeded east along Concession Street, then south along Upper Gage Avenue to Rymal Road. From there, the route turned east and followed Rymal Road to Elfrida and onwards to its eastern terminus at the Honeymoon Bridge Niagara Falls.

Soon thereafter, the Department of Highways (DHO) began to excavate a new cut into the escarpment between Elfrida and Stoney Creek. While under construction in 1931, Highway 20 was rerouted onto what would become known as Centennial Parkway, briefly ending at a junction between Highway 8 and Highway 8A (the present day intersection of Queenston Road and Centennial Parkway); the old routing from Elfrida to downtown Hamilton was renumbered as Highway 20A. The highway descended the escarpment along the now-closed Glover Mountain Road, which connected the modern Greenhill Avenue with First Road. Highway 8A meanwhile, proceeded north from Stoney Creek to Burlington via Burlington Beach; it was renumbered as an extension of Highway 20 when the Stoney Creek Cut was completed in 1932. At the same time, the highway was shifted from Glover Mountain Road to the new Centennial Parkway.

Between Welland and Niagara Falls, Highway 3 originally followed the Merrittville Highway (later Highway 58) and Lundy's Lane to the Honeymoon Bridge; Highway 3A connected Port Colborne to Fort Erie. In 1929, the two route numbers were switched, as traffic pattern had shifted to make use of the new Peace Bridge. After Highway 20 was designated, the Highway 3A designation was superseded between Allanburg and Niagara Falls.

Between Hamilton and Welland, several major diversions were constructed during the 1930s, including west of Elfrida (the old route followed South Townline Road and Chapel Hill Road), east of Kimbo (the old route now known as Kimbo Road) and around St. Anns (having originally followed Twenty Mile Creek Road and St. Anns Road). In 1938, construction began on a large traffic circle between Highway 20 and the QEW in Stoney Creek and on a cloverleaf with Lundy's Lane in Niagara Falls; both were completed prior to the opening of the QEW on August 23, 1940. Highway 20 was now 85.8 km (53.3 mi), its peak length.

Both the QEW and Highway 20 crossed the entrance to Hamilton Harbour utilizing a four lane lift bridge. However, this quickly became one of the two major bottlenecks along the new superhighway. By the early-1950s, traffic lineups often stretched for several kilometres each time the bridge raised. This prompted the DHO to construct a skyway over the canal, which opened on October 30, 1958, and provided four lanes of uninterrupted travel. Subsequently, the use of Highway 20 (now Beach Boulevard) for long-distance travel ceased. In 1964, the portion of Highway 20 between Burlington and the Stoney Creek Traffic Circle was transferred to Halton County and Wentworth County, reducing its length to 74.2 km (46.1 mi).

As part of a series of budget cuts initiated by premier Mike Harris under his Common Sense Revolution platform in 1995, numerous highways deemed to no longer be of significance to the provincial network were decommissioned and responsibility for the routes transferred to a lower level of government, a process referred to as downloading. On January 1, 1998, the province downloaded the majority of Highway 20 to the Regional Municipalities of Hamilton and Niagara. However, a short section remains, connecting Highway 58 to the city boundary of Thorold and Niagara Falls. It is unclear why this short portion was retained in the provincial highway network.

== Major intersections ==
The following table lists the major junctions along Highway 20, as noted by the Ministry of Transportation of Ontario.

Division	Location	km	mi	Destinations	Notes
Hamilton		0.0	0.0	Queen Elizabeth Way – Toronto, Niagara-on-the-Lake Hamilton City Road 20 begins	Former Highway 20 western terminus; northern end of Centennial Parkway; QEW exit 88
Hamilton		0.9	0.56	Barton Street	
Hamilton		2.0	1.2	City Road 8 (Queenston Road)	Formerly Highway 8
Hamilton		3.3	2.1	King Street	Formerly Regional Road 12
Hamilton		5.1	3.2	Ridge Road	Formerly Regional Road 30 east
Hamilton		6.6	4.1	Mud Street	Formerly Regional Road 11
Hamilton		8.5	5.3	Rymal Road City Road 56 south	Formerly Highway 53 west / Highway 56 south; southern end of Centennial Parkway
Hamilton		11.7	7.3	Tapleytown Road	Formerly Regional Road 34 north
Hamilton		12.0	7.5	Woodburn Road	Formerly Regional Road 34 south
Hamilton–Niagara boundary	Hamilton–West Lincoln boundary	14.5	9.0	Westbrook Road Hamilton City Road 20 ends Niagara Regional Road 20 begins	
Niagara	West Lincoln	18.3	11.4	Caistor Centre Road	Formerly Regional Road 6 south
Niagara	West Lincoln	20.3	12.6	Grassie Road	Formerly Regional Road 8 north
Niagara	West Lincoln	23.4	14.5	Regional Road 12 north (Grimsby Road)	
Niagara	West Lincoln	26.9	16.7	Regional Road 14 north (Station Street)	Smithville
Niagara	West Lincoln	27.1	16.8	Regional Road 14 south (Canboro Street)	Smithville
Niagara	West Lincoln	28.2	17.5	Townline Road	Formerly Regional Road 614 west
Niagara	West Lincoln	30.2	18.8	Regional Road 69 east (Twenty Mile Road)	
Niagara	West Lincoln	31.7	19.7	St. Ann's Road	Formerly Regional Road 569 north
Niagara	West Lincoln	34.7	21.6	Regional Road 65 west (Silver Street) Regional Road 27 south (Wellandport Road)	Bismarck
Niagara	West Lincoln–Pelham boundary	42.8	26.6	Regional Road 24 (Victoria Avenue)	
Niagara	Pelham	45.6	28.3	Balfour Street	Formerly Regional Road 28
Niagara	Pelham	48.6	30.2	Effingham Street	Formerly Regional Road 32 north
Niagara	Pelham	50.4	31.3	Regional Road 36 south (Pelham Street)	
Niagara	Pelham	51.4	31.9	Regional Road 54 south (Rice Road)	
Niagara	Thorold	52.2	32.4	Regional Road 50 (Merritville Highway)	
Niagara	Thorold	54.3	33.7	Highway 406 – St. Catharines, Port Colborne	Highway 406 exit 17; former western end of Highway 58 concurrency, At the time of Highway 20's downloading, Highway 406 was still two-lane road.
Niagara	Thorold	56.4	35.0	Allanburg Bridge crosses the Welland Canal	
Niagara	Thorold	0.0 57.6	0.0 35.8	Highway 58 north (Davis Road); Regional Road 82 south (Allanport Road) Highway 20 begins Regional Road 20 breaks	Present-day Highway 20 western terminus
Niagara	Thorold–Niagara Falls boundary	1.9 59.5	1.2 37.0	Regional Road 70 (Thorold Townline Road) Highway 20 ends Regional Road 20 resumes	Present-day Highway 20 eastern terminus
Niagara	Niagara Falls	63.6	39.5	Beaverdams Road	Formerly Regional Road 70 west
Niagara	Niagara Falls	63.7	39.6	Regional Road 98 (Montrose Road) to Queen Elizabeth Way / Highway 420	Former beginning of Niagara Falls Connecting Link
Niagara	Niagara Falls	64.0	39.8	Queen Elizabeth Way	Lundys Lane bridge over QEW (no access), still maintained by MTO
Niagara	Niagara Falls	64.6	40.1	Dorchester Road	Formerly Regional Road 104
Niagara	Niagara Falls	65.6	40.8	Drummond Road	Formerly Regional Road 100
Niagara	Niagara Falls	66.7	41.4	Regional Road 102 (Stanley Avenue) Niagara Regional Road 20 ends	Formerly Regional Road 51 east
Niagara	Niagara Falls	68.0	42.3	Regional Road 420 (Falls Avenue) – Rainbow Bridge to USA	Formerly Highway 420; former Highway 20 eastern terminus
1.000 mi = 1.609 km; 1.000 km = 0.621 mi: Closed/former
