= SS Windoc =

History
- Name: M.A. Hanna (1899-1913); Hydrus (1913-1927); Windoc (1927-1967)
- Namesake: Winnipeg and Dominion of Canada
- Owner: Patterson Steamship Co. of Fort William
- Builder: Globe Iron Works Company
- Launched: 1899
- Out of service: 1967
- Fate: Scrapped

General characteristics
- Class & type: Laker
- Tonnage: 4,661-long-ton (4,736 t)
- Length: 430-foot (130 m)

Windoc was the name of two Great Lakes freighters owned by Canadian shipping company N.M. Paterson & Sons Ltd., with the second ship named in memory of the first in 1986. Both ships suffered similar accidents with lift bridges on the Welland Canal.

== Windoc ==
The first Windoc began as the M.A. Hanna in 1899, a 430-foot (130 m), 4,661-long-ton (4,736 t) steamer built by Globe Iron Works Company that could carry approximately 7,000 long tons (7,100 t). It was reconfigured and sold to Interlake Steamship Co. in 1913, when it was rechristened the Hydrus (2). A previous Hydrus foundered earlier that year, with all hands lost. After a decade moving primarily coal and ore, Interlake Steamship modernized its operations with four new ships, and sold the Hydrus and 11 other ships to Patterson Steamship Co. of Fort William. It was refitted and rechristened the Windoc in the spring of 1927. The vessel's name comes from the city of Winnipeg, where the owner's head offices were based, combined with the fleet suffix doc, referring to the Dominion Of Canada. Its first transit through the Welland came in 1937, where it made frequent grain and coal runs until it was retired and sold for scrap in 1967.

In October 1938, C.N.R. Bridge #20, a vertical lift bridge spanning the Welland Canal near Humberstone, was lowered onto the Windoc before it had safely passed. Considerable damage was done to the ship's spar, stack, and lifeboats, and the cabins and hold were flooded, but no injuries were reported, and the ship was repaired.

== See also ==
- Welland Canal
- MS Windoc (1959)
