= Welland Canal =

Ship canal in Ontario, Canada, connecting Lake Ontario and Lake Erie

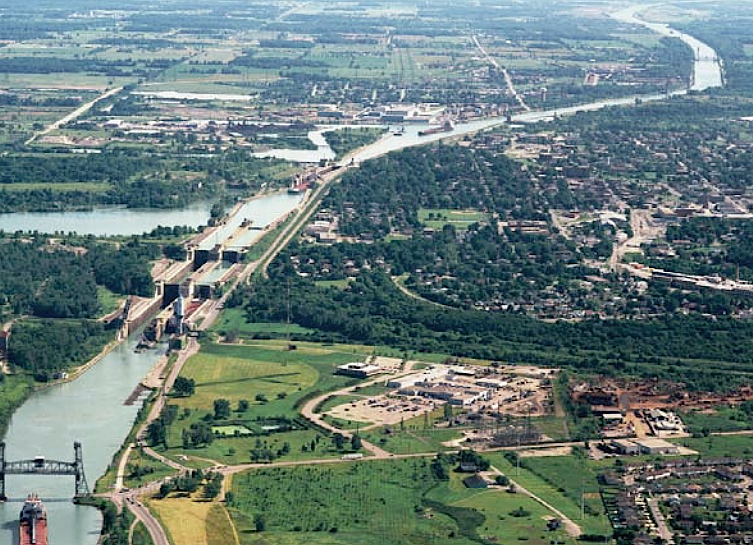
- Interactive map of Welland Canal

Specifications
- Length: 27 miles (43 km)
- Maximum boat length: 740 ft 0 in (225.6 m)
- Maximum boat beam: 78 ft 0 in (23.8 m)
- Maximum boat draft: 26.5 ft (8.08 m)
- Locks: 8
- Status: Open
- Navigation authority: Saint Lawrence Seaway Management Corporation

History
- Original owner: Welland Canal Company
- Principal engineer: Hiram Tibbetts
- Construction began: 1824; 202 years ago
- Date completed: November 30, 1829; 196 years ago
- Date extended: 1833; 193 years ago
- Date restored: August 6, 1932; 94 years ago

Geography
- Start point: Lake Ontario at Port Weller (St. Catharines)
- End point: Lake Erie at Port Colborne

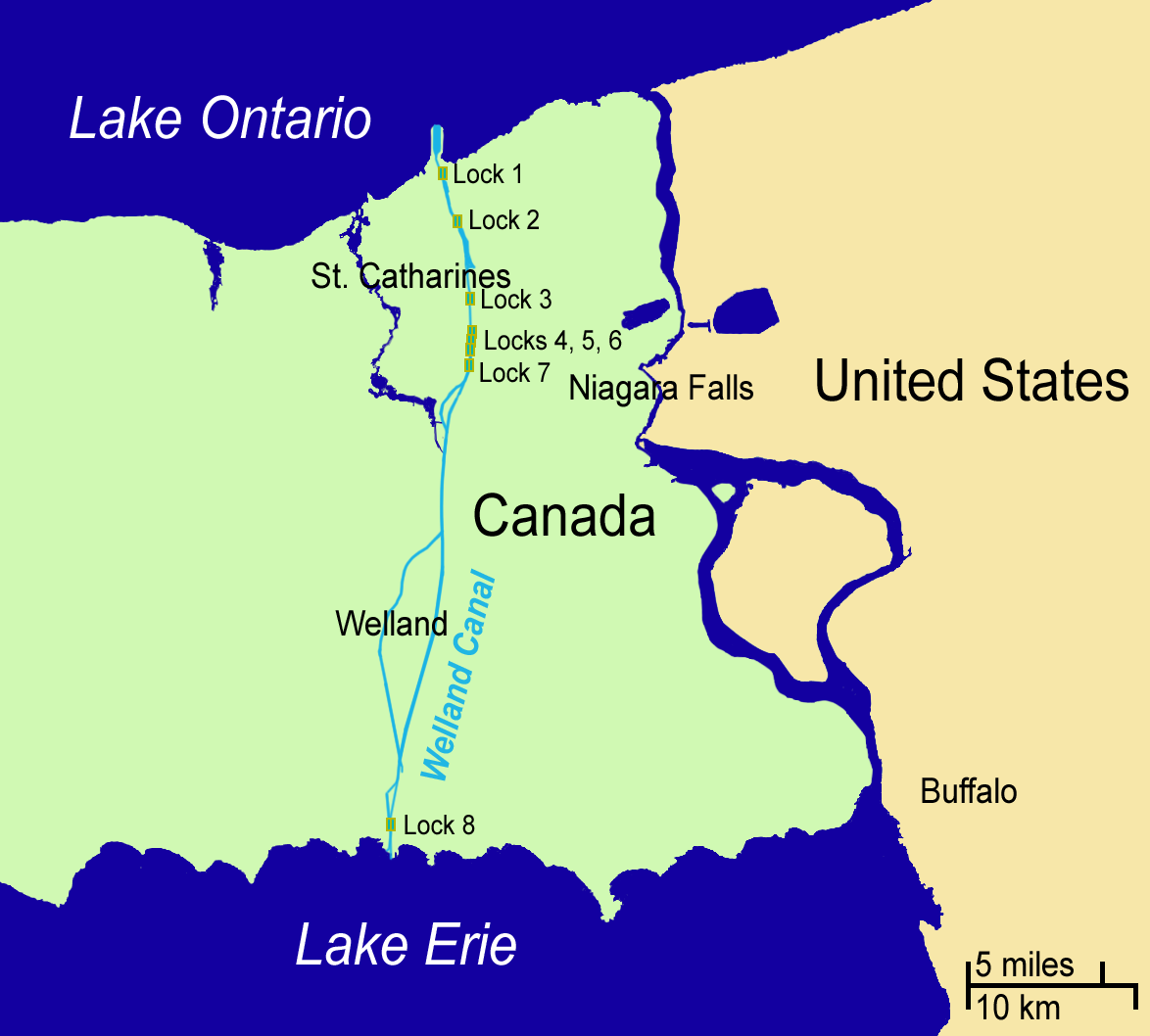
The Welland Canal connects Lake Ontario and Lake Erie through a series of eight locks, allowing ships to bypass the 51 m (167 ft) high Niagara Falls

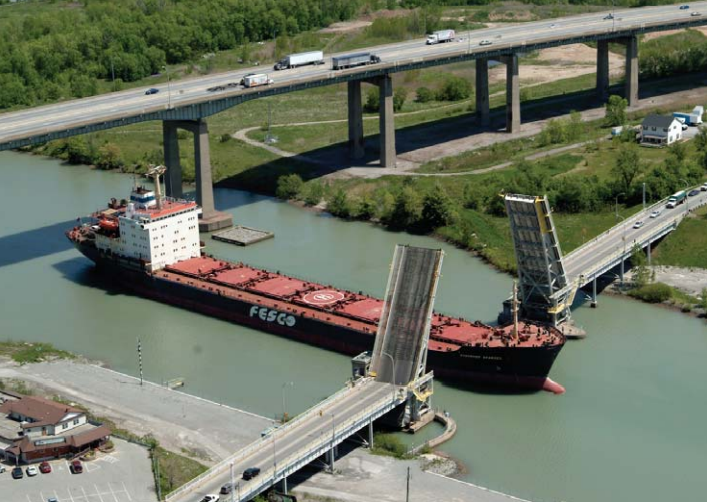
Welland Canal with Garden City Skyway and Homer Lift Bridge

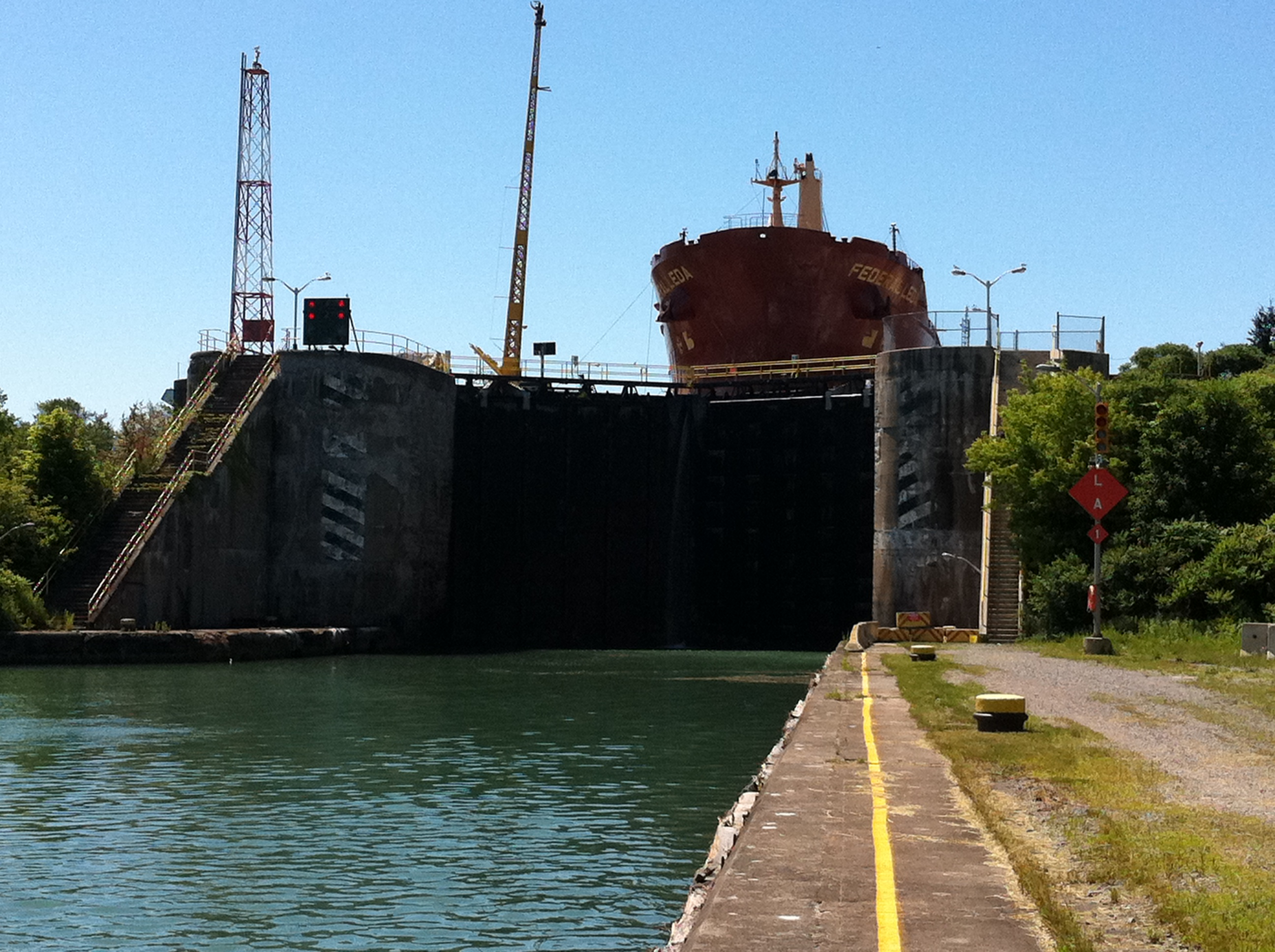
A ship in Lock 3 of the Welland Canal in St. Catharines, just south of the Homer Lift Bridge and Garden City Skyway

The Welland Canal is a ship canal in Ontario, Canada, and part of the St. Lawrence Seaway and Great Lakes Waterway. The canal traverses the Niagara Peninsula between Port Weller on Lake Ontario and Port Colborne on Lake Erie, and was built because the Niagara River—the only natural waterway connecting the lakes—was unnavigable due to Niagara Falls. The Welland Canal enables ships to ascend and descend the Niagara Escarpment, and has followed four different routes since it opened.

The Welland Canal passes about 3,000 ships which transport about 40 million tonnes (88 billion pounds) of cargo a year. It was a major factor in the growth of the city of Toronto, Ontario. The original canal and its successors allowed goods from Great Lakes ports such as Cleveland, Detroit, Milwaukee, and Chicago, as well as other heavily industrialized areas of the United States and Ontario, to be shipped to the Port of Montreal or to Quebec City, where they were usually reloaded onto ocean-going vessels for international shipping.

Since its initial opening on November 30, 1829, the canal has been reconstructed numerous times to accommodate larger vessels and provide for quicker navigation. The First Welland Canal was excavated between 1824 and 1829, and operated until 1845. The Second Welland Canal, built between 1841 and 1845, had locks made of stone rather than wood, and had greater width and depth than the First Canal; it remained in operation for nearly a century before closing permanently in 1935. The Third Welland Canal, built between 1872 and 1877, was deeper and wider still and cut a straighter path through the escarpment, and featured 26 masonry locks lined with wood to protect ships rubbing against the sides or bottom; it operated alongside the second canal, and was also closed in 1935. The Fourth Welland Canal, which remains in operation, began construction in 1913 and, after a delay due to World War I, was completed in 1932. It is deeper and wider than the Third Canal, with an opening that permits two large ships to pass in opposite directions, and it reduced the number of locks to eight, as compared with the 40 locks of the First Canal.

The Welland Canal eclipsed other, narrower canals in the region, such as the Trent-Severn Waterway and the Erie Canal (which linked the Atlantic and Lake Erie via New York City and Buffalo, New York), by providing a shorter, more direct connection from Port Colborne on Lake Erie to Port Weller on Lake Ontario.

The southern terminus of the canal on Lake Erie is 99.5 metres (326 feet) higher than the northern terminus on Lake Ontario. The canal includes eight 24.4-metre-wide (80 ft) ship locks. Seven of the locks (Locks 1–7, the 'Lift' locks) are 233.5 m (766 ft) long, and raise (or lower) passing ships by between 13 and 15 m (43 and 49 ft) each. The southernmost lock, (Lock 8 – the 'Guard' or 'Control' lock) is 349.9 m (1,148 ft) in length.

The Garden City Skyway passes over the canal, which means the masts of ships passing through the canal can be no higher than 35.5 m (116 ft). All other highway or railroad crossings of the Welland Canal are either movable bridges (of the vertical lift or bascule bridge types) or tunnels. The maximum permissible length of a ship in this canal is 225.5 metres (740 feet). It takes an average of about eleven hours for a ship to traverse the Welland Canal.

== History ==
Before the digging of the Welland Canal, shipping traffic between Lake Ontario and Lake Erie used a portage road between Chippawa, Ontario, and Queenston, Ontario, which are both located on the Niagara River—above and below Niagara Falls, respectively.

=== First Welland Canal ===
The Welland Canal Company was incorporated by the Province of Upper Canada, in 1824, after a petition by nine "freeholders of the District of Niagara". One of the petitioners was William Hamilton Merritt, who was in part looking to provide a regular flow of water for his many water-powered industries along the Twelve Mile Creek in Thorold. The construction began at Allanburg, Ontario, on November 30, at a point now marked as such on the west end of Bridge No. 11 (formerly Highway 20). This canal opened for a trial run on November 30, 1829. After a short ceremony at Lock One, in Port Dalhousie, the schooner Anne & Jane (also called "Annie & Jane" in some texts) made the first transit, upbound to Buffalo, New York, with Merritt as a passenger on her deck.

The first canal ran from Port Dalhousie, Ontario, on Lake Ontario south along Twelve Mile Creek to St. Catharines. From there it took a winding route up the Niagara Escarpment through Merritton, Ontario, to Thorold, where it continued south via Allanburg to Port Robinson, Ontario, on the Welland River. Ships went east (downstream) on the Welland River to Chippawa, at the south (upper) end of the old portage road, where they made a sharp right turn into the Niagara River, upstream towards Lake Erie. Originally, the section between Allanburg and Port Robinson was planned to be carried in a tunnel. However, the sandy soil in this part of Ontario made a tunnel infeasible, and a deep open-cut canal was dug instead.

A southern extension from Port Robinson opened in 1833, with the founding of Port Colborne. This extension followed the Welland River south to Welland (known then as the settlement of Aqueduct, for the wooden aqueduct that carried the canal over the Welland River at that point), and then split to run south to Port Colborne on Lake Erie. A feeder canal ran southwest from Welland to another point on Lake Erie, just west of Rock Point Provincial Park in Port Maitland. With the opening of the extension, the canal stretched 44 km (27 mi) between the two lakes, with 40 wooden locks. The minimum lock size was 33.5 by 6.7 m (110 by 22 ft), with a minimum canal depth of 2.4 m (7.9 ft).

Deterioration of the wood used in the 40 locks and the increasing size of ships led to demand for the Second Welland Canal, which used cut stone locks, within just a few years.

=== Second Welland Canal ===
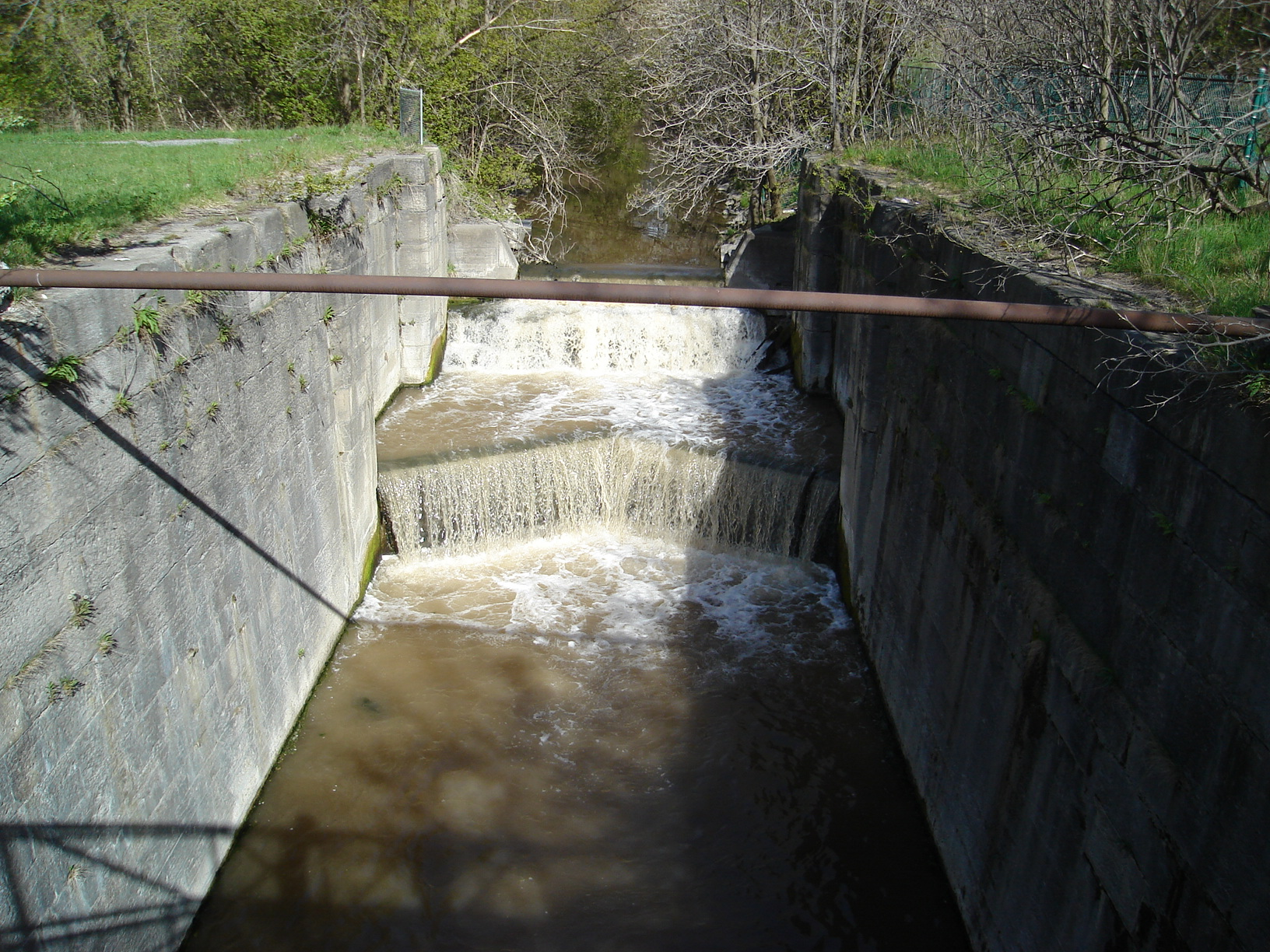
A lock of the second Welland Canal

In 1839 the government of Upper Canada approved the purchase of shares in the private canal company in response to the company's continuing financial problems in the face of the continental financial panic of 1837. The public buyout was completed in 1841, and work began to deepen the canal and to reduce the number of locks to 27, each 45.7 by 8.1 m (150 by 27 ft). By 1846, a 2.7 m (9 ft) deep path was completed through the Welland Canal, and by 1848 that depth was extended the rest of the way to the Atlantic Ocean via the future path of the St. Lawrence Seaway.

Competition came in 1854 with the opening of the Erie and Ontario Railway, running parallel to the original portage road. In 1859, the Welland Railway opened, parallel to the canal and with the same endpoints. But this railway was affiliated with the canal, and was actually used to help transfer cargoes from the lake ships, which were too large for the small canal locks, to the other end of the canal (The Trillium Railway owns the railway's remnants and Port Colborne Harbour Railway). Smaller ships called "canallers" also took a part of these loads. Due to this problem, it was soon apparent the canal would have to be enlarged again. On April 20, 1882, the canal was re-opened, increasing the depth to twelve feet throughout. The increased depth allowed for ships carrying up to 24,000 bushels of grain to navigate the canal whereas they previously they had only been able to carry about 18,000 bushels. The first trip from Oswego carried 700 tons of coal, compared to 500 tons which was possible before the increased depth.

=== Third Welland Canal ===
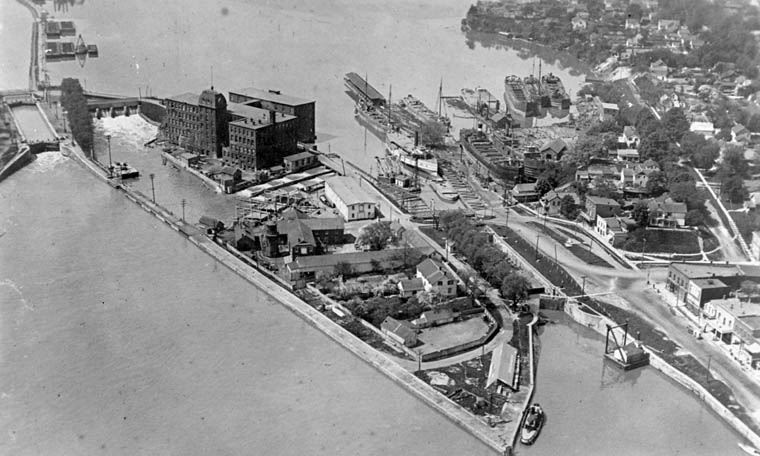
Aerial photo of Port Dalhousie from the third canal era. 3rd canal lock at left, 2nd canal lock at right. Note 3rd canal towpath at upper left and Muir brothers' ship yard centre right.

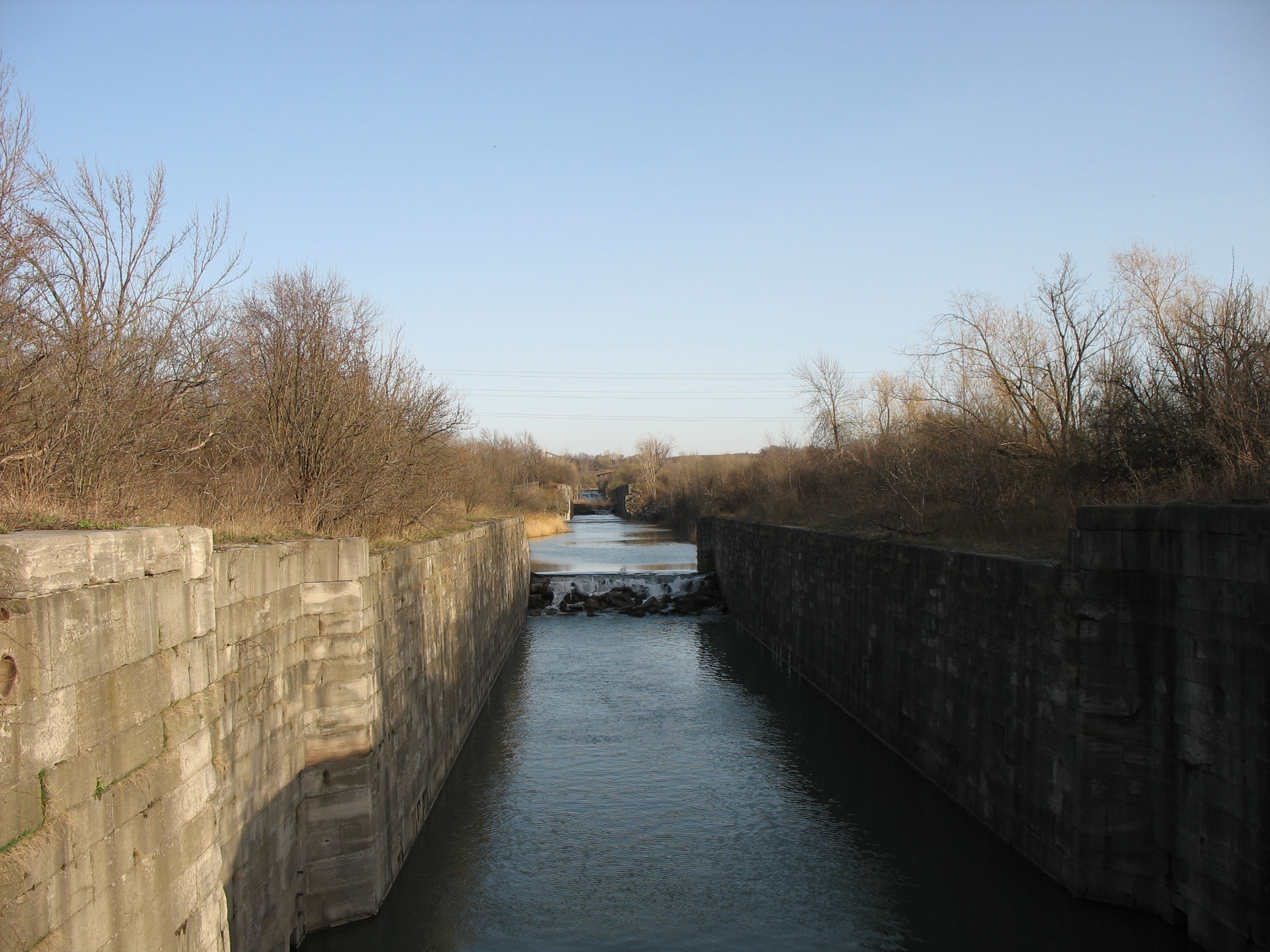
Abandoned locks of the third canal

In 1887, a new shorter alignment was completed between St. Catharines and Port Dalhousie. One of the most interesting features of this third Welland Canal was the Merritton Tunnel, built in 1876 on the Grand Trunk Railway line that ran under the canal between Locks 18 and 19. Another nearby tunnel carried the canal over a sunken section of the St David's Road. The new route had a minimum depth of 4.3 m (14 ft) with 26 stone locks, each 82.3 m (270 ft) long by 13.7 m (45 ft) wide. Even so, the canal was still too small for many boats.

=== Fourth (current) Welland Canal ===
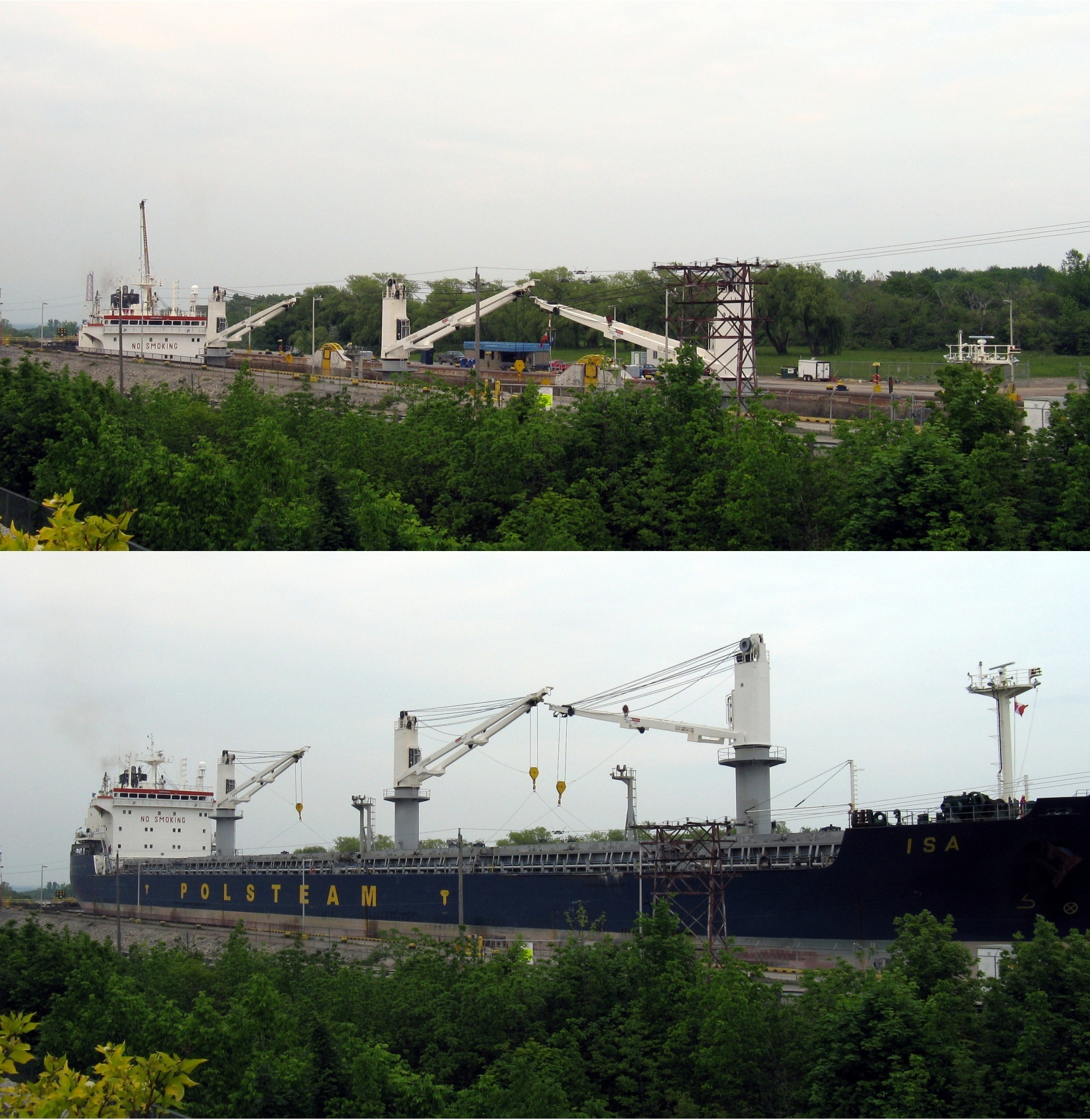
MS Isa lifted in Lock 7

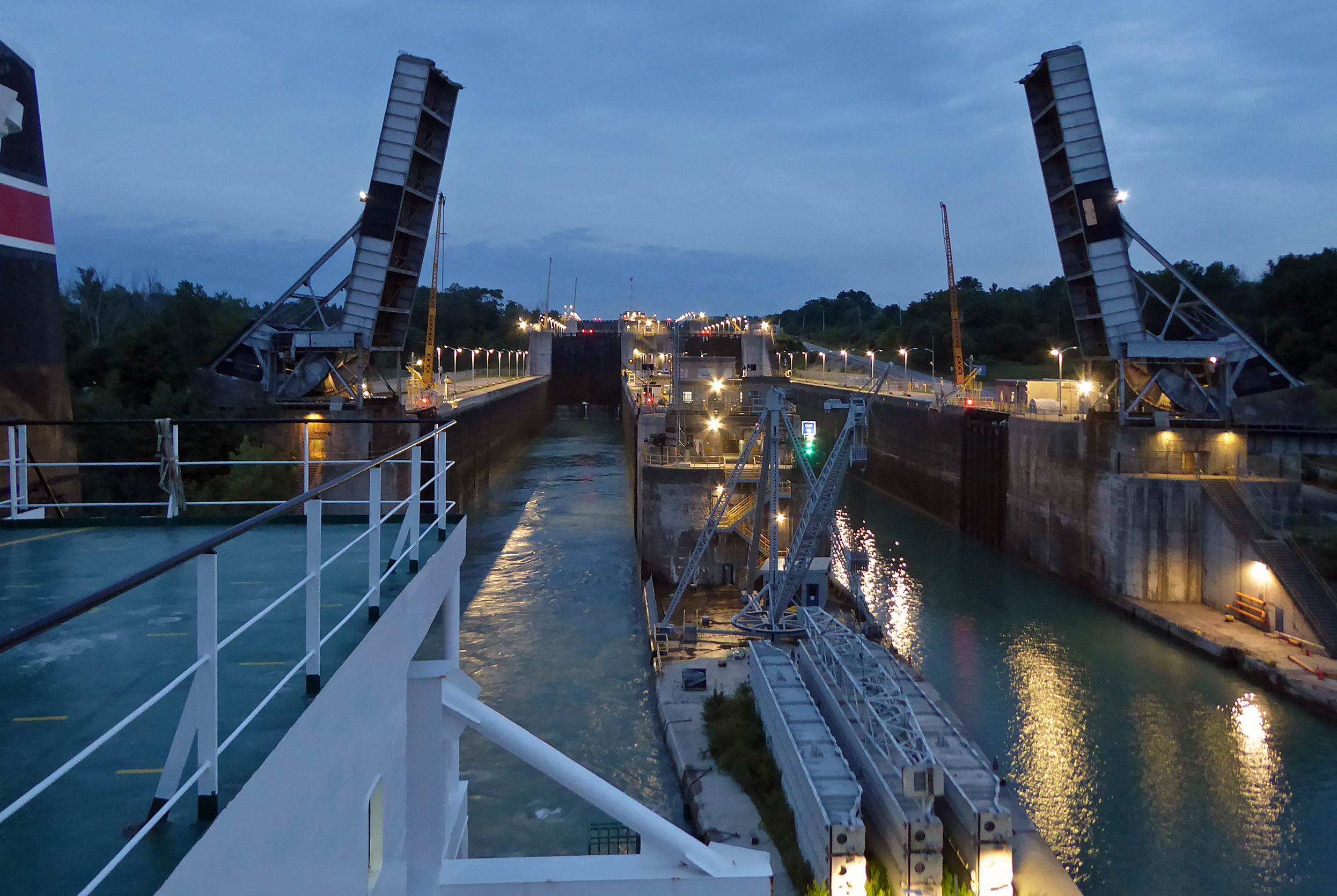
MS Juno leaving Lock 4

Construction on the current canal began in 1913, but work was put on hold from 1916 to 1919 due to a shortage of workers during World War I (1914–18) and was completed and officially opened on August 6, 1932. Dredging to the planned 25 foot depth was not completed until 1935. The route was again changed north of St. Catharines, now running directly north to Port Weller. In this configuration, there are eight locks, seven at the Niagara Escarpment and the eighth, a guard lock, at Port Colborne to adjust with the varying water depth in Lake Erie. The depth was now 7.6 m (25 ft), with locks 233.5 m (766 ft) long by 24.4 m (80 ft) wide. This canal is officially known now as the Welland Ship Canal. The Welland Canal's first "hands-free" vacuum mooring was tested in Lock 7 prior to 2014. The installation of the updated systems for Locks 1 through 7 was originally set to be completed in 2017, but the project was not finished until early 2018 after unforeseen delays.

==== Welland By-Pass ====
In the 1950s, with the building of the present St. Lawrence Seaway, a standard depth of 8.2 m (27 ft) was adopted. The 13.4-kilometre (8.3 mi) long Welland By-Pass, built between 1967 and 1972, opened for the 1973 shipping season, providing a new and shorter alignment between Port Robinson and Port Colborne and by-passing downtown Welland. The old routing of the canal became known as the Welland Recreational Waterway.

All three crossings of the new alignment—one an aqueduct for the Welland River—were built as tunnels. Around the same time, the Thorold Tunnel was built at Thorold and several bridges were removed.

=== Proposed Fifth Welland Canal ===
These projects were to be tied into a proposed new canal, titled the Fifth Welland Canal, which was planned to by-pass most of the existing canal to the east and to cross the Niagara Escarpment in four twinned Panamax locks. While land for the project was expropriated and early designs initiated, the project never got past early planning or construction stages and has since been shelved.

The present Welland Ship Canal was originally designed to last until 2030, almost 100 years after it first opened, and 200 years since the first full shipping season of the original canal in 1830. Subsequent improvements to the canal infrastructure mean that it may last much longer before it needs to be replaced.

== Accidents ==
On June 20, 1912, the government survey steamer La Canadienne lost control due to mechanical problems in the engine room and smashed into the upstream gates of Lock No. 22 of the 3rd Welland Canal, forcing them open by six inches. The resulting surge of water flooded downstream, cresting the upstream gates of Lock No. 21 where five boys were fishing. One boy ran to safety and one of the boys was saved by a government surveyor. But the remaining three were knocked into the water, drowning in the surge.

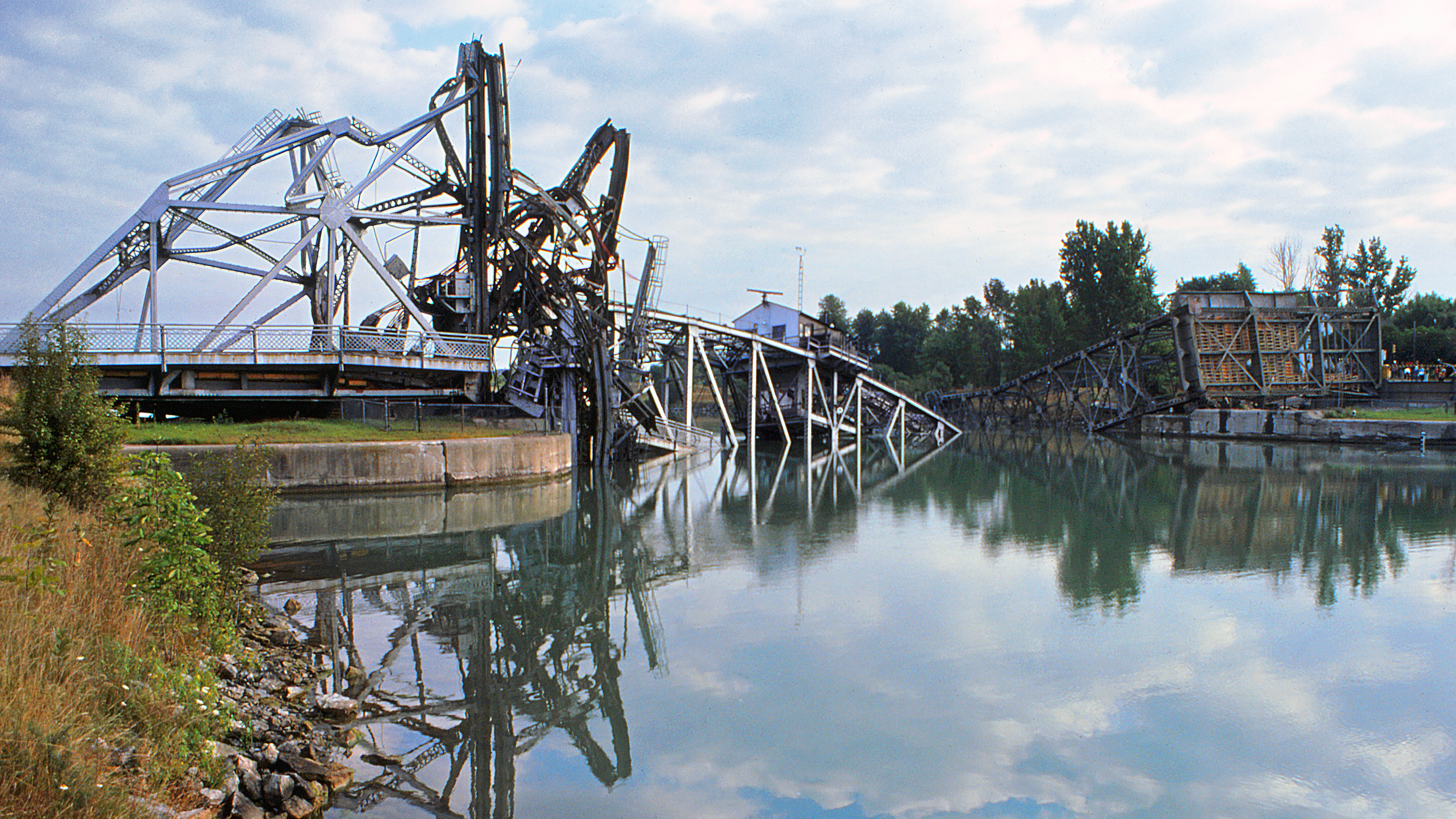
Aftermath of the collision with the Port Robinson Bridge 12

On August 25, 1974, the northbound ore-carrier Steelton struck Bridge 12 in Port Robinson. The bridge was rising and the impact knocked the bridge over, destroying it. No one was killed. The bridge master, Albert Beaver, and a watchman on the ship suffered minor injuries. The bridge has not been replaced and the inhabitants of Port Robinson have been served by a ferry for many years.

On August 11, 2001, the lake freighter Windoc collided with Bridge 11 in Allanburg, closing vessel traffic on the Welland Canal for two days. The accident destroyed the ship's wheelhouse and funnel (chimney), ignited a large fire on board, and caused minor damage to the vertical-lift bridge. The accident and portions of its aftermath were captured on amateur video. The vessel was a total loss, but there were no reported injuries, and no pollution to the waterway. The damage to the bridge was focused on the centre of the vertical-lift span. It was repaired over a number of weeks and reopened to vehicular traffic on November 16, 2001. The Marine Investigation Report concluded, "it is likely that the [vertical-lift bridge] operator's performance was impaired while the bridge span was lowered onto the Windoc."

At around noon on Wednesday September 30, 2015, the Lena J cargo ship collided with Bridge 19 in Port Colborne, closing the bridge to all vehicle and pedestrian traffic until an assessment could be made on the condition of the bridge. The vessel had sustained damage to its bridge, but was still able to continue on its voyage to Burns Harbour, Indiana. Pictures of the damage sustained to the vessel and Bridge 19 were captured. On Friday October 1, 2015, Chris Lee, an acting direct engineer for the City of Port Colborne, said that the St. Lawrence Seaway Management Corporation (SLSMC) would likely close the bridge to all vehicle traffic until the end of the year. However, pedestrians would be able to cross the bridge, and emergency services will be able to cross the bridge on a limited basis. On Tuesday October 6, 2015, the City of Port Colborne released a media statement, which stated that Bridge 19, "will remain closed to vehicular traffic until after the close of the shipping season in December. Repairs will begin in early January." Detour routes were planned and mapped by the City of Port Colborne and the City of Welland in order to ease the flow of traffic over Bridge 19A.

The Welland Canal Fallen Workers Memorial at Lock 3 was unveiled on November 12, 2017. This commemorates the 137 workers who died while building the canal.

On July 11, 2020, two cargo ships, the Alanis and the Florence Spirit, struck each other while executing a passing manoeuvre near Port Robinson. According to the St. Lawrence Seaway Management Corporation, no one was injured, no cargo was spilled, and an investigation would be undertaken. The final investigation report was released in August 2022.

== Sabotage ==
The Welland Canal has been the focus of plots on a number of occasions throughout its existence. However, only two have ever been carried out. The earliest and potentially most devastating attack occurred on September 9, 1841, at Lock No. 37 (Allanburg) of the First Welland Canal (43.07796°N 79.20991°W) (approximately 180 m north of today's Allanburg bridge), when an explosive charge destroyed one of the lock gates. However, a catastrophic flood was prevented when a guard gate located upstream of the lock closed into place preventing the upstream waters from careening down the route of the Canal and causing further damage and possible injury or loss of life. It was suspected that Benjamin Lett was responsible for the explosion.

On April 21, 1900, about 6:30 in the evening, a dynamite charge was set off against the hinges of Lock No. 24 of the Third Welland Canal (just to the east of Lock No. 7 of today's canal (43.122976°N 79.192372°W)), doing minor damage. This time, the saboteurs were caught in nearby Thorold. John Walsh, John Nolan and the ringleader "Dynamite" Luke Dillon (a member of Clan-na-Gael) were tried at the Welland Courthouse and found guilty, receiving life sentences at Kingston Penitentiary. The "star witness" at the trial was a 16-year-old Thorold girl named Euphemia Constable, who caught a good look at the bombers before being knocked unconscious by the blast. While waiting to testify, the girl received death threats, but they turned out to be a hoax. As for the prisoners, Nolan lost his sanity while incarcerated, John Walsh was eventually released while Luke Dillon remained in custody until July 12, 1914.

The First World War brought with it plots against the canal and the most notable of them came to be known as "The Von Papen Plot". In April 1916, a United States federal grand jury issued an indictment against Franz von Papen, Captain Hans Tauscher, Captain Karl Boy-Ed, Constantine Covani and Franz von Rintelen on charges of a plot to blow up the Welland Canal. However, Papen was at the time safely on German soil, having been expelled from the US (where he had been serving as a German military attaché) several months previously for alleged earlier acts of espionage and attempted sabotage. Von Papen remained under indictment on these charges until he became Chancellor of Germany in 1932, at which time the charges were dropped.

== Shipping season ==
The canal regularly opens late March through December, with closure in the winter due to hazardous weather. On March 20, 2007, the record for the earliest season opening was broken, and matched the following year.

== Pleasure craft ==
The canal allows passage of pleasure craft (such as recreational motorboats and sailboats), though priority through the canal is explicitly assigned to commercial vessels. To transit the canal aboard a pleasure vessel, the following conditions must be met:

- The vessel must be more than 6 m (20 ft) in length, or weigh more than 900 kg (1 ton)
- Vessels must be propelled by a motor (sailboats are permitted, but cannot use their sails)
- Dinghies must be stowed on the vessel's deck, they may not be towed behind the vessel
- A minimum of 3 capable crew members are required on upbound transits (2 to handle moorings + 1 operator)
- A minimum of 2 capable crew members are required on downbound transits (1 to handle moorings + 1 operator

To transit the canal, reservation and payment must be made online. As of February 2025, the fee to traverse all eight locks is $200 CAD.

== Facts and figures ==
=== Current canal ===
- Maximum vessel length: 225.5 m (740 ft)
- Maximum vessel draft: 8.08 m (26.5 ft)
- Maximum above-water clearance: 35.5 m (116 ft)
- Minimum vessel size: 6 m (20 ft) or 900 kg (0.99 short tons)
- Elevation change between Lake Ontario and Lake Erie: 99.5 m (326 ft)
- Average transit time between the lakes: 11 hours
- Length of canal: 43.5 km (27.0 mi)

=== Increasing lock size ===
Canal	First (1829)	Second (1846)	Third (1887)	Fourth (1932)
Locks	40	27	26	8
Width (metres)	6.7	8.1	13.7	24.4
Length (metres)	33.5	45.7	82.3	261.8
Depth (metres)	2.4	2.7	4.3	8.2

=== List of locks and crossings ===
Locks and crossings are numbered from north to south.

Municipality	Lock or bridge number ^{†}	Crossing	Remarks
St. Catharines	Lock 1		43.217484°N 79.212992°W
St. Catharines	Bridge 1	Lakeshore Road (Regional Road 87)	Bascule bridge
St. Catharines	Bridge 2	Church Road (Now Linwell Road)	Never installed
St. Catharines	Lock 2		43.193131°N 79.202178°W
St. Catharines	Bridge 3A	Carlton Street (Regional Road 83)	Bascule bridge. Replaced original Bridge 3 (destroyed in accident)
St. Catharines	Bridge 4A	Garden City Skyway: Queen Elizabeth Way	
St. Catharines	Bridge 4	Queenston Street (Regional Road 81) (former Highway 8)	Bascule bridge, also known as "Homer Lift Bridge"
St. Catharines	Lock 3		43.155230°N 79.193058°W location of Welland Canal Information Centre
St. Catharines	Bridge 5	Glendale Avenue (Regional Road 89)	Vertical-lift bridge
St Catharines	Bridge 6	Great Western Railway (Ontario) (now Canadian National Railway)	Bascule bridge
St Catharines	Lock 4		twinned flight lock
Thorold	Locks 5–6		43.134283°N 79.191899°W twinned flight locks
Thorold	Lock 7		43.123446°N 79.193895°W southernmost lift over the Niagara Escarpment
Thorold	Bridge 7	Hoover Street	removed
Thorold	Bridge 8	Niagara, St. Catharines and Toronto Railway (now Canadian National Railway)	removed
Thorold		Thorold Tunnel, carries Highway 58	
Thorold	Bridge 9	Ormond Street	removed
Thorold	Bridge 10	Welland Railway (now Canadian National Railway)	removed winter 1998
Thorold	Bridge 11	Canboro Road (Regional Road 20) (former Highway 20)	Vertical-lift bridge. Lowered prematurely on Windoc in 2001
Thorold	Bridge 12	Bridge Street (Regional Road 63)	destroyed by the Steelton in 1974, replaced by a pedestrian ferry
Welland		Main Street Tunnel: (Highway 7146)	
Welland		Townline Tunnel: Highway 58A and Canadian National Railway/Penn Central	
Port Colborne	Bridge 19	Main Street (Regional Road 3) Highway 3	Bascule bridge
Port Colborne	Lock 8		42.899122°N 79.246166°W control lock
Port Colborne	Bridge 19A	Mellanby Avenue (Regional Road 3A)	Bascule bridge
Port Colborne	Bridge 20	Buffalo and Lake Huron Railroad (now Canadian National Railway)	removed winter 1997
Port Colborne	Bridge 21	Clarence Street	Vertical-lift bridge

== Profile ==
The following illustration depicts the profile of the Welland Canal. The horizontal axis is the length of the canal. The vertical axis is the elevation of the canal segments above mean sea level.

Profile of the Welland Canal from Lake Ontario (left) to Lake Erie (right)

== Old alignment prior to Welland By-Pass relocation ==
Municipality	Bridge Number ^{†}	Crossing	Remarks
Welland Recreational Waterway branches off from the Welland By-Pass at Port Robinson
Thorold		Canadian National Railway	built during the relocation
Thorold		Highway 406	built after the relocation
Welland		Woodlawn Road (Regional Road 41)	built after the relocation
Welland	Bridge 13	East Main Street/West Main Street (Regional Road 27)	vertical-lift bridge, counterweights removed 42°59′30″N 79°15′05″W
Welland		Division Street (Regional Road 527)	built after the relocation
Welland	Bridge 14	Lincoln Street	rebuilt as fixed-span after the relocation 42°59′01″N 79°15′16″W
Welland	Bridge 15	Canada Southern Railway (Penn Central)	rare Baltimore truss swing bridge 42°58′37″N 79°15′21″W
Welland	Bridge 16	Ontario Road/Broadway Avenue	rebuilt as fixed-span after the relocation, the new span located to the north of the original site of Bridge 16 42°58′25″N 79°15′21″W
cut by western approaches to Townline Tunnel (Highway 58A and Canadian National Railway/Penn Central)
Welland	Bridge 17	Canada Air-Line Railway (now Canadian National Railway)	vertical-lift bridge, counterweights still present 42°56′57″N 79°15′00″W
Welland	Bridge 18	Forks Road	bridge span removed 42°56′50″N 79°14′58″W
Welland Recreational Waterway merges with the Welland By-Pass at Ramey's Bend in Port Colborne

^{†} If assigned by the St. Lawrence Seaway Authority. The original bridges across the fourth canal were numbered in order. Numbering was not changed as bridges were removed.

== See also ==
- Container on barge
