= MV Windoc =

Bulk carrier built in 1959

History
- Name: Rhine Ore (1959-1977); Steelcliffe Hall (1977-1988); Windoc (1988-2002)
- Namesake: Windoc
- Owner: Transatlantic Bulk Carriers Inc; Halco; N. M. Paterson & Sons Ltd (1988-2002)
- Builder: Schlieker-Werft, Hamburg
- Yard number: 533
- Launched: 11 April 1959
- Completed: July 1959
- Identification: IMO number: 5293872
- Fate: Broken up in 2011

General characteristics (as laker)
- Type: Laker
- Tonnage: 18,531 GRT; 29,050 DWT
- Length: 222.5 m (730 ft 0 in) oa; 218 m (715 ft 3 in) pp
- Beam: 23.1 m (75 ft 9 in)
- Propulsion: 1 diesel engine, 1 shaft
- Speed: 14.5 kn (26.9 km/h; 16.7 mph)

MV Windoc was a lake freighter or laker, initially constructed as an ocean-going bulk carrier in West Germany in 1959. Entering service that year as Rhine Ore, the ship was renamed Steelcliffe Hall in 1977 and reconstructed as a laker. In 1988 the laker was renamed Windoc and in 2001, was involved in a collision with a bridge on the Welland Canal which caused the ship to catch fire. The ship was declared a constructive total loss. While undergoing repairs in Ontario, the ship broke free of its moorings and grounded. Later pulled free, the vessel was eventually converted into a barge.

== Description ==
Windoc was initially constructed as the bulk carrier Rhine Ore. As a bulk carrier the ship had a gross register tonnage of 8,202 tons and a deadweight tonnage of 19,918 tons. The ship measured 166.4 metres (545 ft 11 in) overall and 157.5 metres (516 ft 9 in) between perpendiculars with a beam of 22.6 metres (74 ft 2 in). The ship was powered by one diesel engine and had a maximum speed of 14.5 knots (26.9 km/h; 16.7 mph).

The Rhine Ore was part of a class of 8 sisterships (Ems Ore, Rhine Ore, Ruhr Ore, Weser Ore, Clyde Ore, Tees Ore, Thames Ore and Tyne Ore). Three of them were purchased by Hall Corp Ltd. of Toronto and rebuilt as lakers.

After the vessel's conversion to a laker, the gross register tonnage increased to 18,531 tons and the deadweight tonnage to 29,050 tons. The length overall of the ship was increased to 222.5 metres (730 ft 0 in) and between perpendiculars to 218 metres (715 ft 3 in). The beam was also increased to 23.1 metres (75 ft 9 in).

== Service history ==
Rhine Ore was ordered from the Schlieker shipyard in Hamburg, West Germany by Transatlantic Bulk Carriers Inc. with the yard number 533. The vessel was launched on 11 April 1959 and completed in July. Registered under a flag of convenience in Monrovia upon entering service, Rhine Ore sailed until sold to Hall Corp Ltd.

The ship was renamed Steelcliffe Hall after the April 1977 sale, it was rebuilt in Canada that year as a laker, with cargo space added forward of the engine room, and the wheelhouse moved aft above the crew accommodation.

After decades of service and changes to the function and structural conversions of the ship, in 1988 Steelcliffe Hall was given the name Windoc (2) after being acquired by N. M. Paterson & Sons Ltd., following the liquidation of the previous owner, Halco.

On 11 August 2001, while traveling through the Welland Canal, Windoc was hit by Bridge 11 in Allanburg, Ontario. The accident caused minor damage to the vertical lift bridge, and destroyed the ship's wheelhouse and funnel. The vessel caught fire, and was later declared a constructive total loss, but there were no reported injuries, no damage to the $6-$8 million cargo, and no pollution to the waterway. The Marine Investigation Report concluded "it is likely that the [vertical lift bridge] operator's performance was impaired while the bridge span was lowered onto the Windoc."

The vessel was towed to Hamilton Harbour for repairs, and in March, 2002, it broke free of its moorings in an 80 km/h (50 mph) winter gale, and ran aground 5 km (2.7 nmi) away in about 1.8 metres (6 ft) of water, where it was pulled out by four tugboats three days later.

N.M. Paterson & Sons left the shipping business the following year, after 87 years, and sued the canal operator, St. Lawrence Seaway Management Corp., for $16.9 million (C). Their remaining four active and three mothballed ships were sold in 2002. The canal operator denied any negligence, and blamed the shipping company and the ship's crew for the accident.

A Transport Safety Bureau report on the collision points to the bridge operator and bridge operating procedures and policies as major factors. They also concluded that impairment of the bridge operator was the root cause.

The ship was converted into a storage barge. It was scrapped in 2011 at Port Colborne.

== See also ==
- Welland Canal
- MS Windoc (1899)
