= Montrose Swing Bridge =

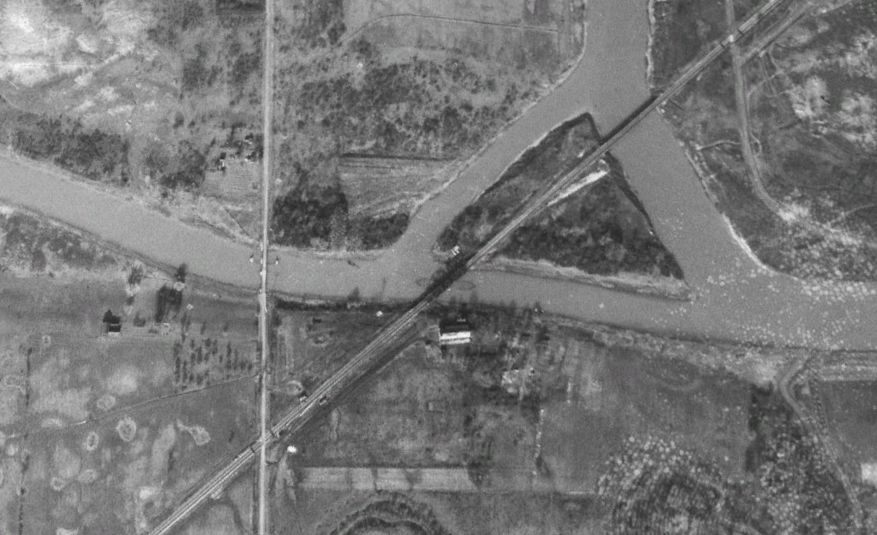
- Aerial view of the bridge, circa 1934.
- Coordinates: 43°02′46″N 79°07′12″W
- Carries: Rail Traffic
- Crosses: Welland River
- Locale: Niagara Falls, Ontario

Characteristics
- Design: Warren Truss swing bridge

History
- Opened: ca. 1910

Location
- Interactive map of Montrose Swing Bridge

The Montrose Swing Bridge is located on the Welland River at the junction with the Queenston Power Canal in the southeast portion of the City of Niagara Falls, Ontario, Canada. It was built ca. 1910 to carry the Canada Southern Railway over the river (click the link to see a discussion of companies who used the Canada Southern tracks over the years). It is a two-track bridge, although only one track remains in use today. It crosses the river at roughly a 45-degree angle.

This bridge is visually similar to the Welland Canal, Bridge 15, although it is a Warren truss, compared to the Baltimore truss of Bridge 15.

== Navigation on the river ==
The Welland River meets with the Welland Canal at Port Robinson, Ontario. When the very first canal opened in 1829, it ended at Port Robinson and all vessels followed the Welland River to the Niagara River at Chippawa, Ontario. The canal was extended through to Lake Erie in 1833, but the Welland River remained in service as a commercial shipping channel for approximately another century. It provided a route to the industries along the Niagara River and Buffalo, NY, as well as access to the Erie Canal without journeys through open water.

During World War I, a military unit known as the "Welland Canal Force" (or, sometimes, the "Welland Canal Protection Force") was created to protect critical shipping links in Niagara, including this bridge. Images available from the Niagara Falls Library "Digital Niagara" collection show military forces on this bridge, as well as several other locations in the area.

There is a level difference of about 8 feet between the Welland River and the Welland Canal, with the canal being the higher of the two. This was overcome via a lock at Port Robinson. This lock was of limited size. As ships increased in size, especially with the opening of the greatly expanded Fourth Welland Canal in 1932, the demand for navigation on the river diminished.

A New York Central Railroad timetable published in April, 1936 mentions this bridge and associated interlocking. In an April, 1939 timetable, it is no longer mentioned, therefore it is assumed that the bridge had ceased to swing by that time.

== The bridge today ==
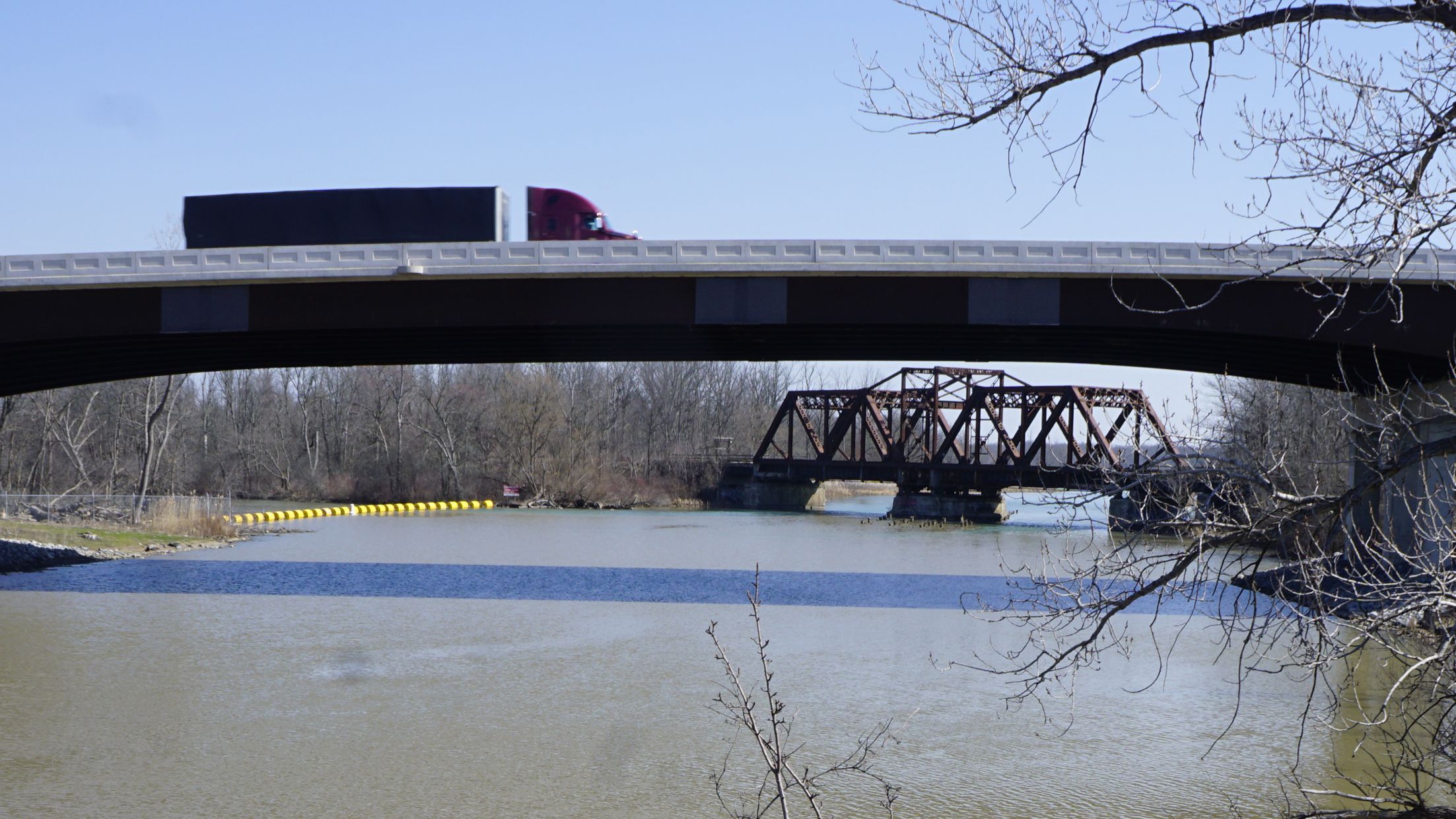
The Bridge in 2024.

Up until 2001, the bridge carried the Canadian Pacific Railway (CPR) Hamilton Subdivision to the Michigan Central Railway Bridge crossing the Niagara River to the United States. The line saw several trains per day. Late in that year, the Hamilton Subdivision was abandoned where it passed through the busy tourist area of Niagara Falls and trains were re-routed over a Canadian National Railway line to enter the United States via the International Railway Bridge. The track crossing the Montrose Swing Bridge was re-designated as the Montrose Subdivision. It now exists exclusively to service a couple of industries within the boundaries of the city of Niagara Falls and carries only one or two short trains per week.

== See also ==
- CPR Montrose Yard, former yard connected to the bridge
