= Welland Canal Bridge 15 =

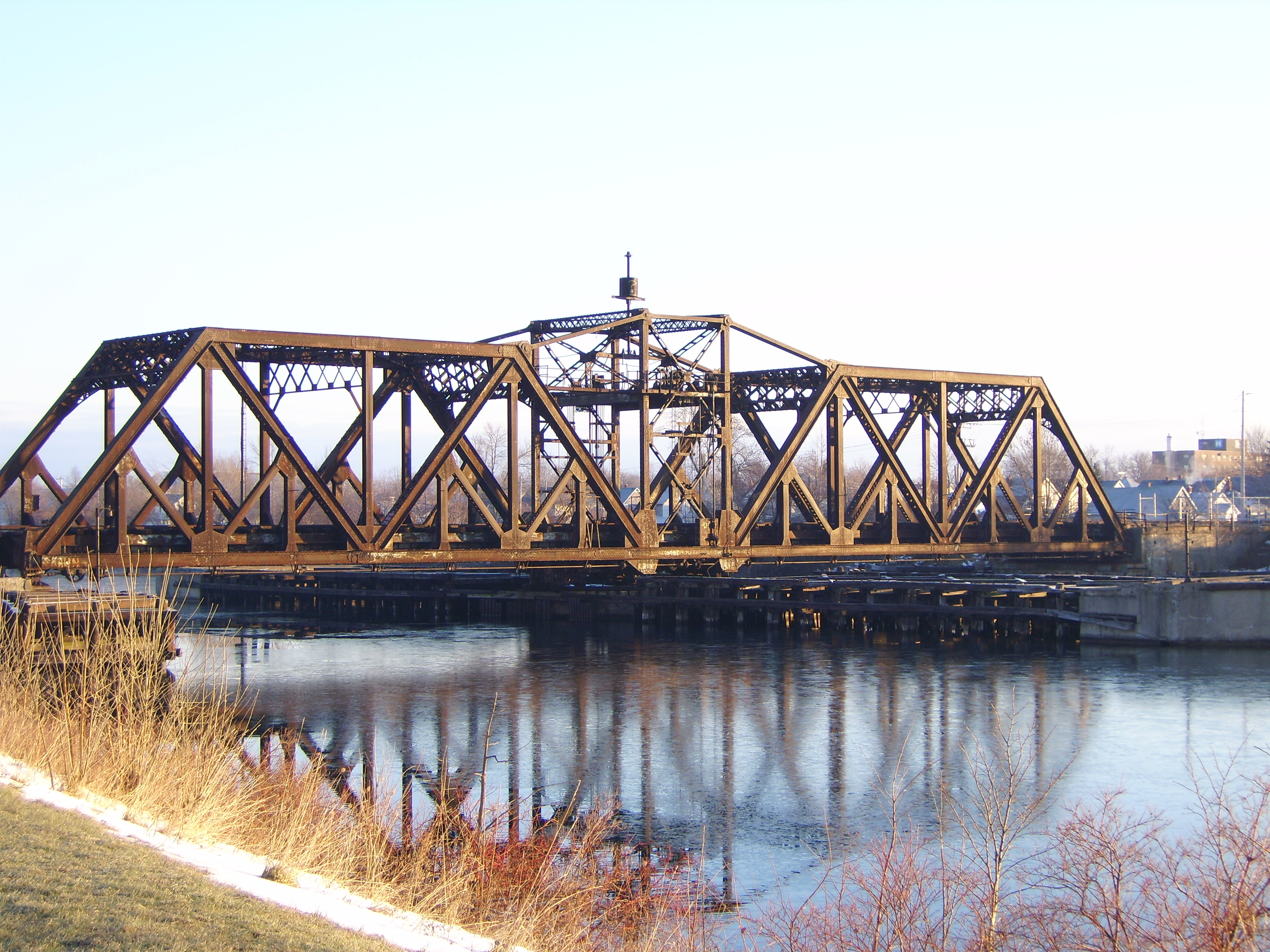
- Bridge 15 - The Canada Southern Railway swing bridge over the former route of the Welland Canal
- Coordinates: 42°58′37″N 79°15′21″W
- Carries: rail traffic
- Crosses: Welland Recreational Waterway
- Locale: Welland, Ontario
- Maintained by: Canadian Pacific Railway

Characteristics
- Design: Baltimore Truss swing bridge

History
- Opened: c. 1910

Location
- Interactive map of Welland Canal Bridge 15

The Welland Canal Bridge 15 is a two-track Baltimore truss swing bridge located in the disused section of the Welland Canal within the city of Welland, Ontario. This section of canal is now known as the Welland Recreational Waterway. The bridge formerly carried the main line of the Canada Southern Railway (CASO) over the canal.

As a result of the Welland Canal Relocation Project in the early 1970s, the CASO line was rerouted through the Townline Tunnel, bypassing this bridge. One track crossing Bridge 15 remained in service as an interchange line between the Canadian National Railway Canal Subdivision through Welland and the new Wainfleet Marshalling Yard at Wainfleet, Ontario. In the late 1980s, service on this line between Welland and Wainfleet ended and the track was removed between Wainfleet and a point a couple of hundred meters west of Bridge 15.

The bridge remains in use today exclusively to serve Vesuvius Industries in Welland. It is owned by the Canadian Pacific Railway (CPR), but is not connected to any other CPR tracks. It is used only sporadically by Trillium Railway, and chain link fence gates have been installed at both ends of the bridge to keep trespassers off.

Bridge 15 is visually similar to the Montrose Swing Bridge located on the Welland River approximately 15 km away; however, that bridge is a Warren Truss, as opposed to the rarer Baltimore Truss of Bridge 15. The two bridges were constructed at approximately the same time. The Niagara, St. Catharines and Toronto Railway Swing Bridge over the canal (Bridge 8) at Thorold, Ontario was also constructed at approximately the same time. That bridge, built for interurbans (known as radials in Ontario) and light electric freight locomotives, was a lighter construction and only carried a single track. Bridge 8 no longer exists.

== Design and construction ==
Bridge 15 was built ca. 1910 as a replacement for a wooden bridge formerly at the same location. During this time, the Third Welland Canal was still in use, however the need for expansion of the canal had been recognized. Accordingly, any new bridges were being constructed to standards which were expected to apply to the Fourth Welland Canal, which would not be completed until 1932. As will be discussed later in this article, these standards were not set high enough and this fact would make the swing bridge a serious hazard to navigation decades down the road.

During the early years of its existence, prior to the opening of the fourth canal, navigation was only possible to the east side of the bridge. Electrical power to operate the bridge was supplied via an overhead cable from the west shore. With the opening of the fourth canal, there was navigable water on both sides making an overhead wire impossible. Since the bridge was designed to have the power fed from overhead and not beneath, an underwater cable was run from the shore to the more northerly concrete fender (which protected the ends of the bridge from ships when it swung). A pole was erected on each fender, and a guy wire run between them directly over the bridge. The power cable was suspended from this guy wire to reach the top-hat-shaped device in the middle of the bridge which transferred the power to the rotating bridge. This top-hat, and the two poles on the fenders, are still visible today. This is a relatively unusual method of providing power to a swing bridge.

== Operations ==
As with most moveable bridges on railway lines, Bridge 15 was protected by interlocking. This system made it physically impossible to have a signal indicating to trains that it was clear to proceed when the bridge was open.

In the case of bridge 15, however, the operator was responsible for more than just the bridge itself. The bridge control cabin also functioned as an interlocking tower for the junction with the Toronto, Hamilton and Buffalo Railway (located a short distance west of the bridge), as well as a crossover immediately west of the bridge, the at-grade crossing of the Niagara, St. Catharines & Toronto Electric Railway (N, S & T), and sidings on both sides of the canal. The N, S & T line was abandoned in the 1960s, but the other interlocking remained until the canal relocation in 1972/73. Accordingly, the bridge would have needed to be staffed year round - even when the canal was closed for the winter.

== Hazard to navigation ==
It is a fact that gigantic ships sometimes do not go precisely where their master wants them to. Navigating thousands of tons of ship through a bridge with only a few meters to spare must indeed have been a challenge. There were accidents. One, documented with photographic evidence in a yahoo! discussion group shows the timber fenders on the west side of the bridge crushed, obviously by an impact from a ship. The swing bridge sitting right in the middle of the channel was severe hazard. Anecdotes from some sailors who travelled through this bridge indicate that there was a bell located on the bridge which would ring whenever a ship made contact. This would warn the crew to check for damage.

After the opening of the St. Lawrence Seaway in 1959, large ocean-going vessels were frequent visitors to the Welland Canal. Many of these ships are far better suited to the open ocean than to the narrow confines of the canal.

== Canal relocation ==
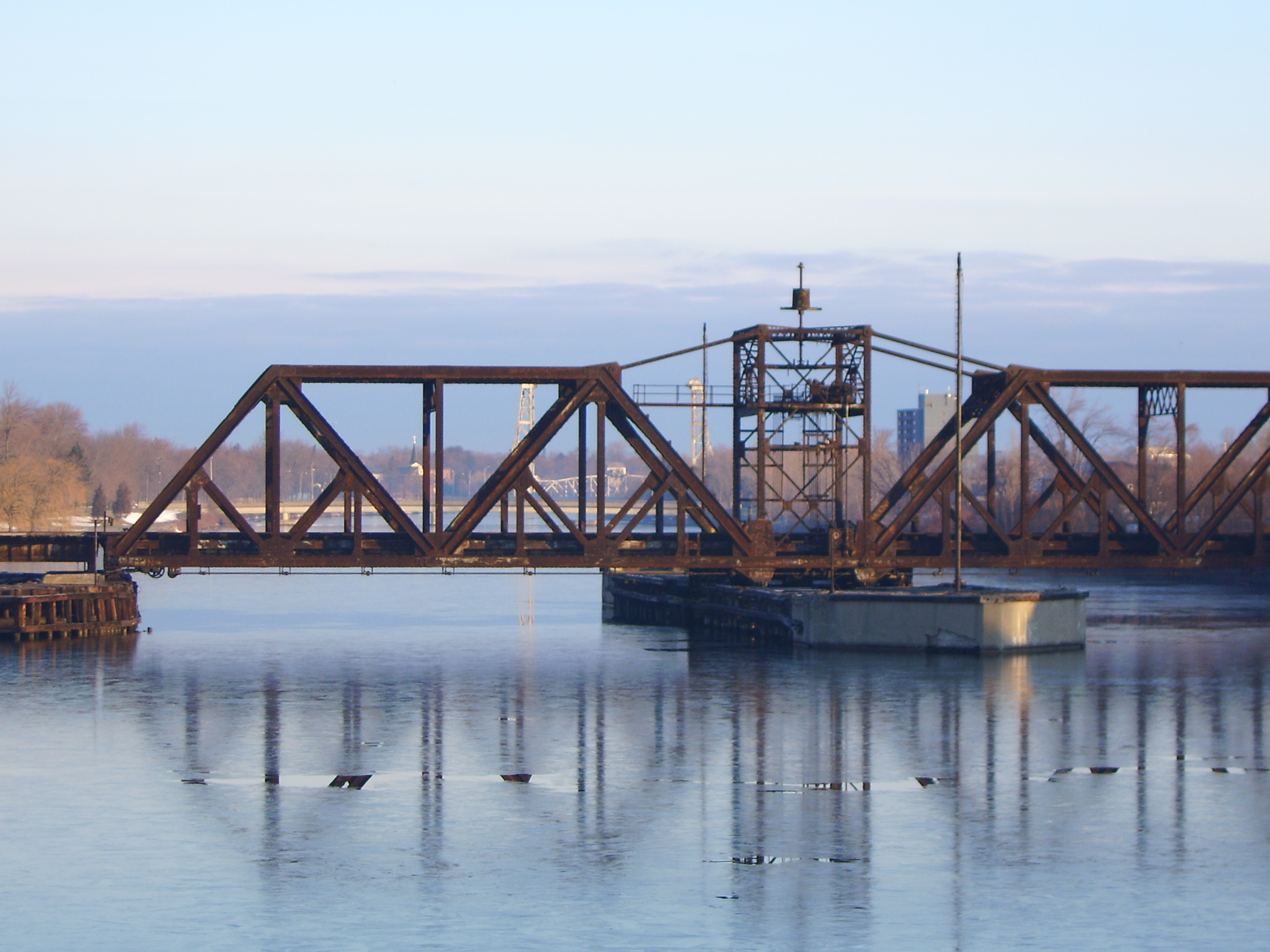
View of the bridge with Bridge 13 (the Main Street vertical lift bridge) visible in the background

The hazard created by this bridge, combined with the fact that the narrow, curving section of canal through Welland had no less than a total of six bridge crossings in just a few miles, led to the decision to inaugurate the Welland Canal Relocation Project. With the first sod turned in 1967, this project would relocate the canal to a much straighter alignment with no bridges about 2 km east of bridge 15.

This route of the new canal would sever the CASO line. As part of the relocation project, this line, as well and the Canadian National Cayuga Subdivision, were rerouted through the new Townline Tunnel. Bridge 15 ceased to be on the main line, and with the removal of shipping from the abandoned canal, it no longer had any reason to swing. It continued to be used as an interchange route between Canadian National and various railway companies operating out of the Wainfleet Yard. The west bound track was removed, leaving only a single track operational on the bridge. But even this service was not to last. In the late 1980s, the line fell into disuse and was removed from a point just a couple of hundred meters west of Bridge 15.

== The bridge today ==
Today, this bridge carries only rare movements into Vesuvius Industries by Trillium Rail. The bridge is a rusting relic. Pictures from an historic bridge site show the top plates of the main beams under the former west bound line to be almost completely rusted away. In an attempt to keep trespassers off the bridge, the railway has placed gates at each end blocking access.

The bridge can be accessed from each end via walking/bicycle trails, although the gates prevent access onto the bridge deck. The bridge is a popular destination for scuba divers.
