= Chippawa, Ontario =

Chippawa
- Unincorporated community
- Interactive map of Chippawa
- Coordinates: 43°3′21″N 79°2′49″W
- Country: Canada
- Province: Ontario
- Regional municipality: Niagara
- City: Niagara Falls
- Founded: 1850
- Time zone: UTC-5 (EST)
  - Summer (DST): UTC-4 (EDT)
- Forward sortation area: L2G
- Area codes: 905 and 289
- NTS Map: 30M3 Niagara
- GNBC Code: FAQPM

Chippawa is a community located within the city of Niagara Falls, Ontario.

The village was founded in 1850, and became part of the City of Niagara Falls, Ontario by amalgamation in 1970. It is located on the Canadian shore of the Niagara River about 2 km upstream from Niagara Falls. It is bisected by the Welland River (also known locally as Chippawa Creek or The Crick). In historic documents, the name of the village and the river is sometimes spelled as Chippewa or Chippeway.

== Early history ==
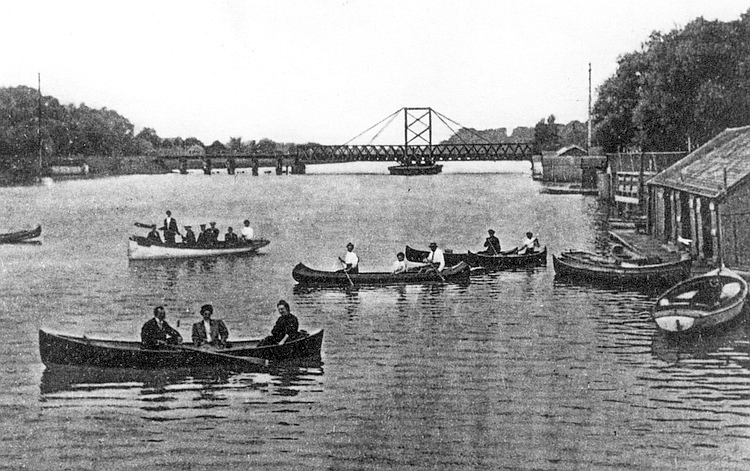
Boating at Chippawa, 1905

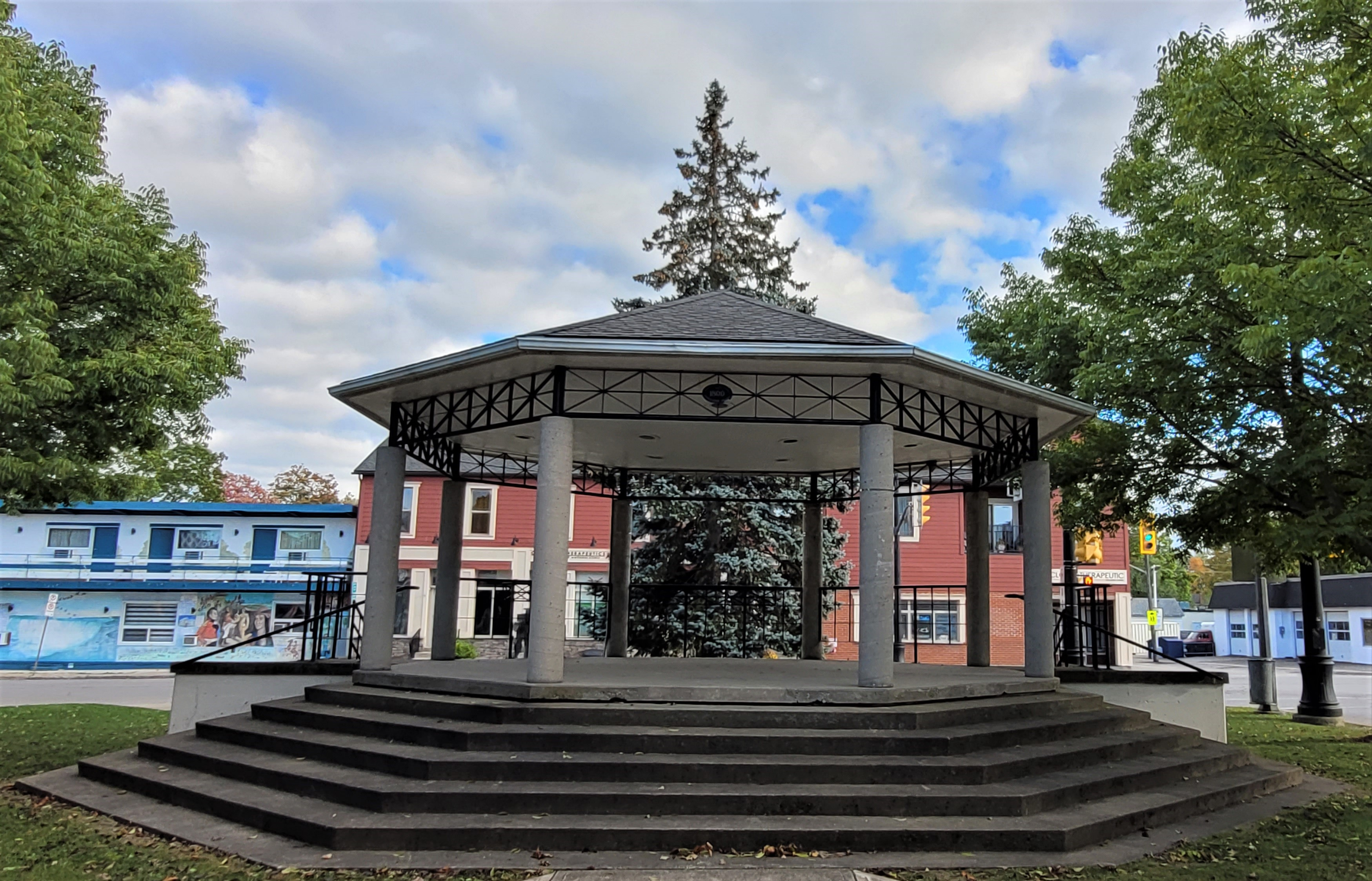
Bandstand-Cummington Square-Niagara Falls-Ontario

=== First Nations ===
While the area has undoubtedly been populated by First Nations people for many thousands of years, very few details from times before European contact are known.

The French encountered a group of people whom they called the "Neutral Indians", because they lived between the more powerful and combative Wendat (Huron) to the north and Haudenosaunee to the south, but were not involved in their wars (at least in recorded time).

Eventually, however, the Neutral nation was wiped out by the Haudenosaunee and almost nothing of their culture survives - the name by which they called themselves is unknown.

Following the extermination of the Neutrals, the area was abandoned by the Haudenosaunee and settled by a branch of the Chippewa nation, originating the former name of the river and subsequently the name of the village. The Mississauga, a branch of the Ojibwa, were actually the tribe present when the British first colonized the area and were the very first to sign a treaty in what is now Canada with the British government, giving the British access to a one-mile strip of land on the western shore of the Niagara to replace the portage they had lost on the eastern shore after the New England colonies separated from British rule. The Ojibwe made the area one of the stopping area when migrating from the Atlantic region.

Once Niagara-On-The-Lake filled up with United Empire Loyalists the British began giving land grants to U.E.L and British veterans to settle in the late 18th century.

The name of the principal village of the Neutrals – Onghiara (located on the present-day site of Niagara on the Lake was mispronounced by the Chippewa as Nyahgeah, and again by Europeans as Niagara, making this word one of the few remnants of Neutral culture.

=== Earliest settlers ===
The first permanent settler of European descent in what is now Chippawa was Thomas Cummings. He was a United Empire Loyalist from Albany, New York who settled on the south side of the Welland River in 1783.

Later that same year, John Burch settled on the north side of the Welland River, and in 1786, he built saw- and gristmills along the Niagara River.

== Military history ==
=== Fort Chippawa ===
A fort was built in 1791 (at the present day site of Kings Bridge park) to defend the south end of the Portage Road and the King's Bridge (discussed in the Transportation section). This was also known as Fort Welland and consisted of a log blockhouse surrounded by a stockade.

=== War of 1812 ===
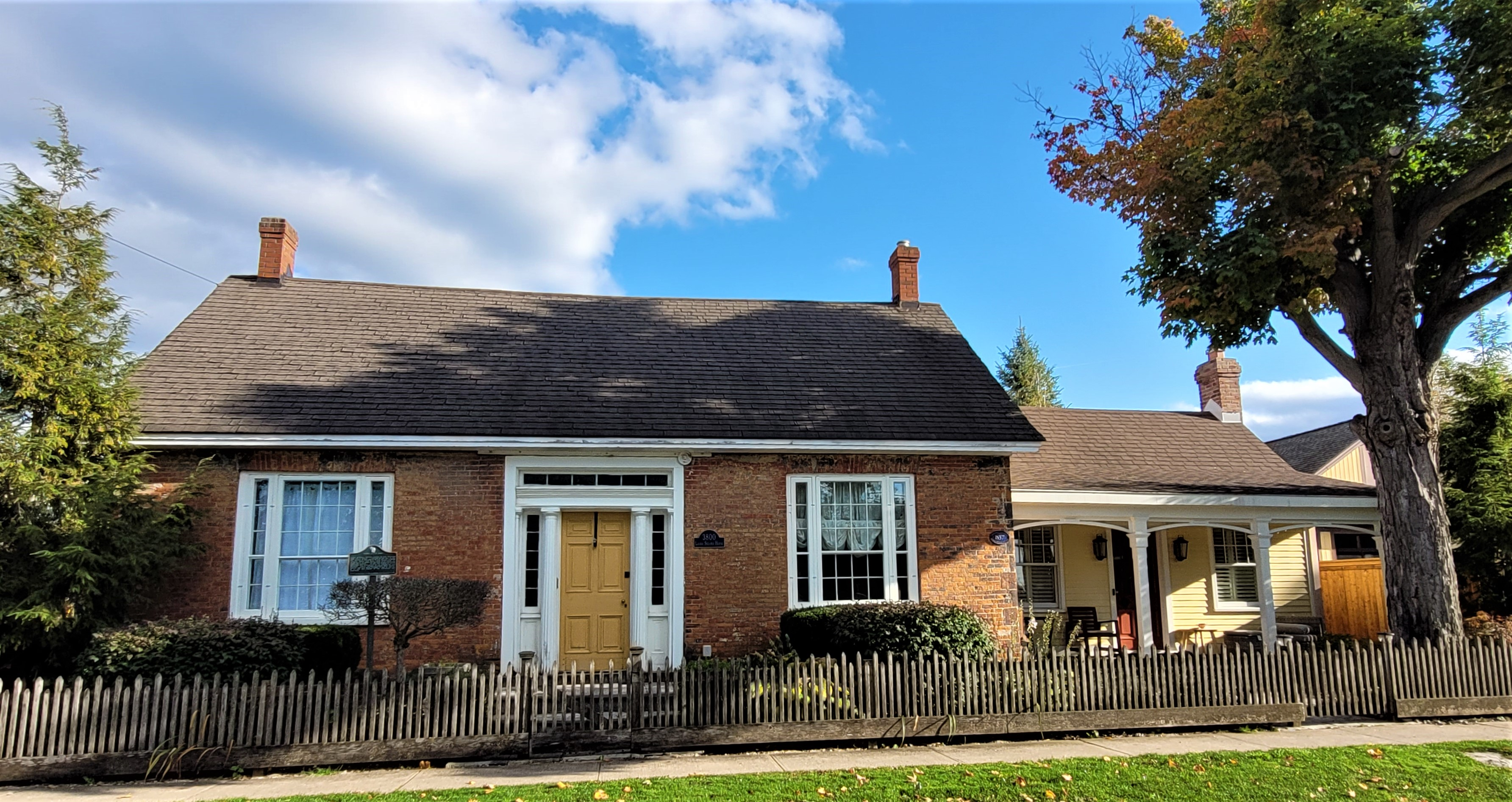
Laura Secord House, c. 1837, Chippawa - Niagara Falls-Ontario

A plain at Usshers Creek (about 2 km south of Chippawa, and then called Streets Creek) was the site of the Battle of Chippawa on July 5, 1814, and also the site of the American camp to which they retired following the Battle of Lundy's Lane on July 25, 1814.

After the War of 1812, Chippawa also became the home of Laura Secord, remembered for carrying information to the British regarding American advances before the Battle of Beaverdams. She lived in the village until her death at the age of 93.

== Transportation ==
=== Navigation and the Portage road ===
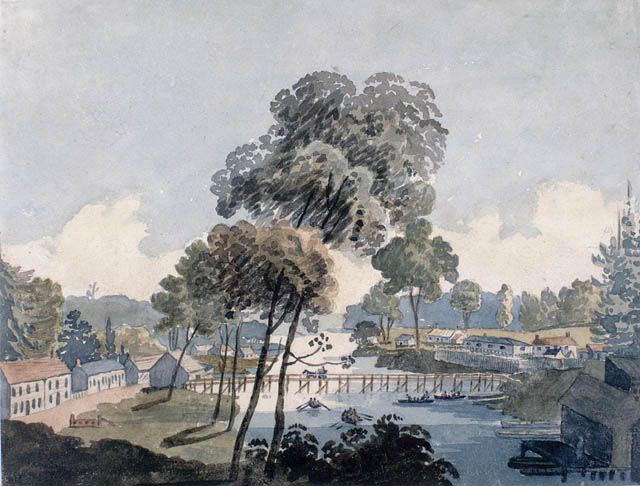
A copy of George Heriot's sketch of Kings Bridge in 1801

Chippawa is the limit of navigation on the Upper Niagara River. Before the construction of the Welland Canal, to reach Lake Ontario all cargo and passengers had to be unloaded and carried overland to navigable waters below the falls

Before the War of American Independence, all cargo was carried on the eastern side of the river along the historic Niagara Portage. Following this, British interests required a route within their territory. A survey conducted in 1790 reserved a strip one chain wide between Chippawa and Queenston, Ontario as a public road, which would become the Portage Road.

Most of this road remains today, following its original winding route in contrast to the rectangular grid of other Niagara Falls streets.

King's Bridge, constructed about 1790, was the very first bridge over the Welland River. It was at the mouth of the river, closer to the Niagara than today's bridge. Sketches by Lady Simcoe (wife of Lieutenant Governor John Graves Simcoe) and deputy postmaster George Heriot each show a bridge consisting of pilings driven into the river with a wooden deck.

The bridge was of great military importance as the only crossing of the river. A survey available in the Brock University Special Collections indicates that this was a drawbridge. This survey also shows a new bridge at the location of the current one.

During the first several years that the Welland Canal operated, it did not reach Lake Erie directly. All canal traffic was lowered in a lock at Port Robinson, Ontario to the Welland River, and subsequently sailed to Chippawa, reaching Lake Erie via the Niagara River. Ships entering and leaving the Niagara faced a difficult and dangerous turn into a swift current. The Welland River curved downstream into the Niagara and ships rounding this point were in danger of being swept over the falls.

That problem was resolved by construction of the Chippawa Cut in 1829. This short canal allowed ships to turn upstream into the Niagara River directly and avoid the most severe currents. The cut is depicted in the survey mentioned above.

By the mid-1830s, the Welland Canal had been extended to enter Lake Erie at Port Colborne, Ontario, but commercial navigation on the river continued for roughly another century. In 1843, over 100 steamers carried passengers and some freight on a route that followed the Niagara River from Buffalo, New York, then into the Welland River at Chippawa, joining the Welland Canal at Port Robinson, and subsequently via the Feeder Canal to Dunnville, Ontario and up the Grand River to Brantford, Ontario.

While commercial shipping no longer exists in Chippawa, pleasure boating continues and marina facilities can be found at Lyon's Creek just west of the village. Somewhat farther to the west is a relic of the days of commercial shipping – the Montrose Swing Bridge still carries a railway track over the river even though it has not opened for a ship in about 75 years.

=== Railways ===
==== Erie and Ontario Railway ====
Even with the Welland Canal providing access between the lakes in the 1830s, the portage road was still carrying a great deal of people and cargo. The canal took over 24 hours to pass through, and could not handle the largest ships of the day. It was inevitable that a railway would be built to streamline movement around Niagara Falls.

The Erie and Ontario railroad opened for traffic in 1839. It had wooden rails with iron straps laid on them and was pulled by horses. This was the first railway in the Niagara Peninsula. By 1854, steam power took over for the horses. A year later, the railway was extended to Niagara (the present day Niagara on the Lake), and in the 1860s, was extended to Fort Erie, Ontario at the source of the Niagara River. The line was now known as the Erie and Niagara. This route became the Canada Southern Railway's Niagara Division and operated into the 20th century. A short section remains in service today as an industrial spur, ending at north side of the Welland River. This is the only active railway in Chippawa today, and there is no passenger service.

The stone piers which once carried this railway over the Welland River on a swing bridge are still present.

==== Niagara Falls Park and River Railway ====
The Niagara Falls Park and River Railway was trolley line was constructed along the Niagara River between Chippawa and Queenston in 1893. The line crossed the Welland River on a bridge at Cummings Lane and proceeded about 1.5 km south to Slater's Dock (also known as Chippawa Landing), where it connected with steamboats from Buffalo. The railway carried passengers to Queenston, where connections were made with steamboats to Toronto, Ontario and other points on Lake Ontario. Moreover, it carried tourists to the falls and connected with the Niagara, St. Catharines and Toronto Railway, which provided interurban service to St. Catharines, Ontario. With the decline of boat service from Buffalo and establishment of through rail service, the line to Slater's Dock was abandoned in the early 20th century and service was cut back to the village of Chippawa.

Most of this line was combined with a parallel route on the American side and lasted until 1932 as the Niagara Gorge Railroad (also known as the Great Gorge Route, or the Niagara Belt Line). Although pamphlets and advertisements for the Great Gorge Route show service only as far as Niagara Falls, historic maps of the area show tracks leading to the north side of the Welland River until at least 1934.

=== Modern road access ===
Chippawa does not lie on any major highways. Four main streets lead to the village, all converging at the bridge over the Welland River.

The Niagara Parkway provides access to the village from both the North and South. Main Street, which changes into Lyons Creek Road outside of the village, makes the most direct connection with a major highway - the Queen Elizabeth Way 6 km away. The last main route is the original Portage Road, linking to the business area of Niagara Falls.

=== Bicycle and pedestrian routes ===
The Niagara Heritage Trail passes along the eastern edge of Chippawa, crossing the Welland River via the control dam right at the junction with the Niagara River. This paved walking and cycling trail runs from Niagara on the Lake to Fort Erie. Furthermore, Lyon's Creek Road has paved shoulders for cyclists, and the Chippawa Parkway on the north side of the river is paved and highly suitable for cycling or walking.

=== Public transit ===
Niagara Falls Transit provides local bus service between the village and the main part of Niagara Falls. Routes 106, 112, and 206 serves the vicinity.

== Business and industry ==
Many industries have been located either within the municipal boundaries of Chippawa, or just a short distance outside the village boundaries:

=== Historic industry ===
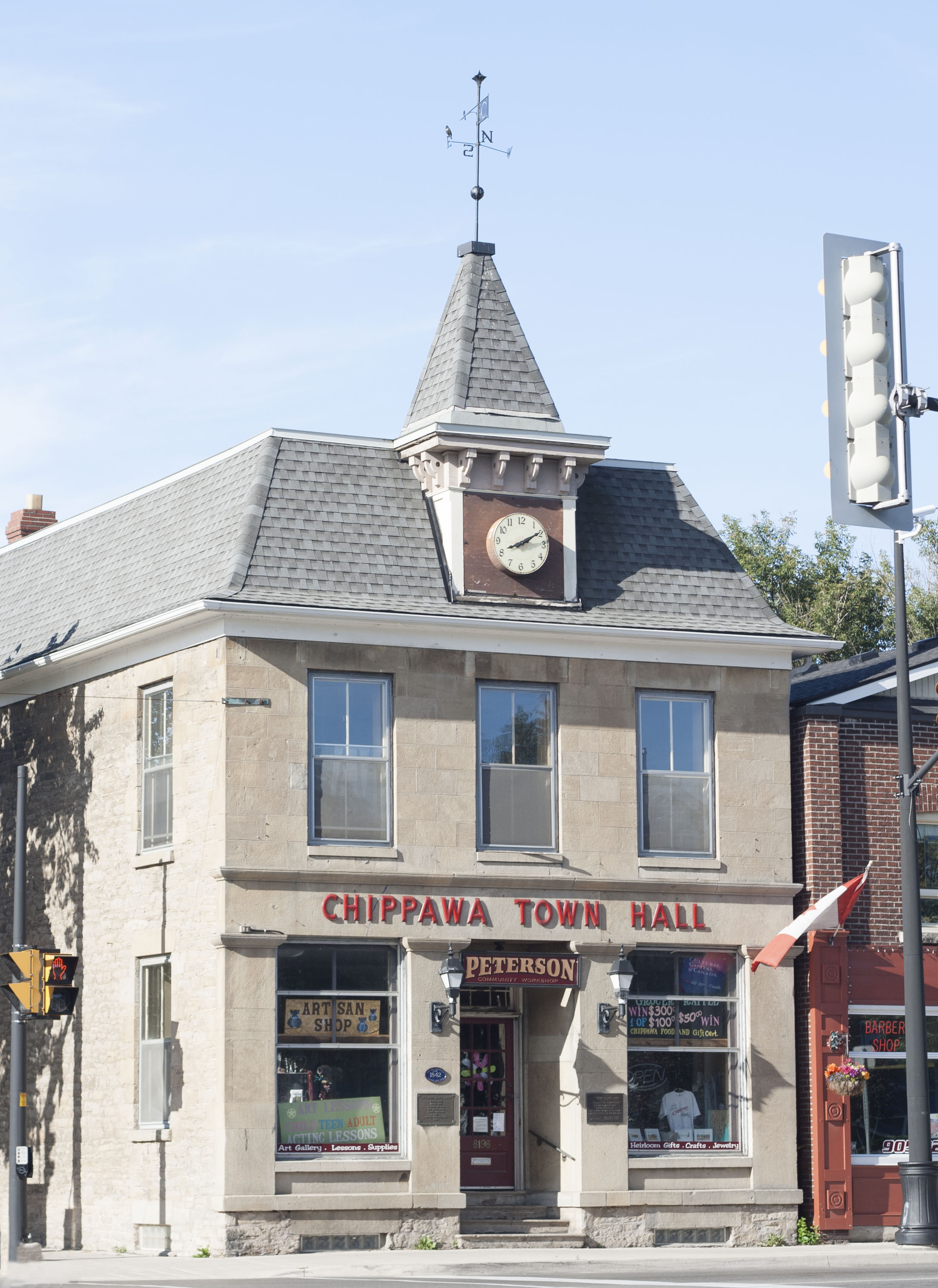
Chippawa Town Hall, erected in 1842

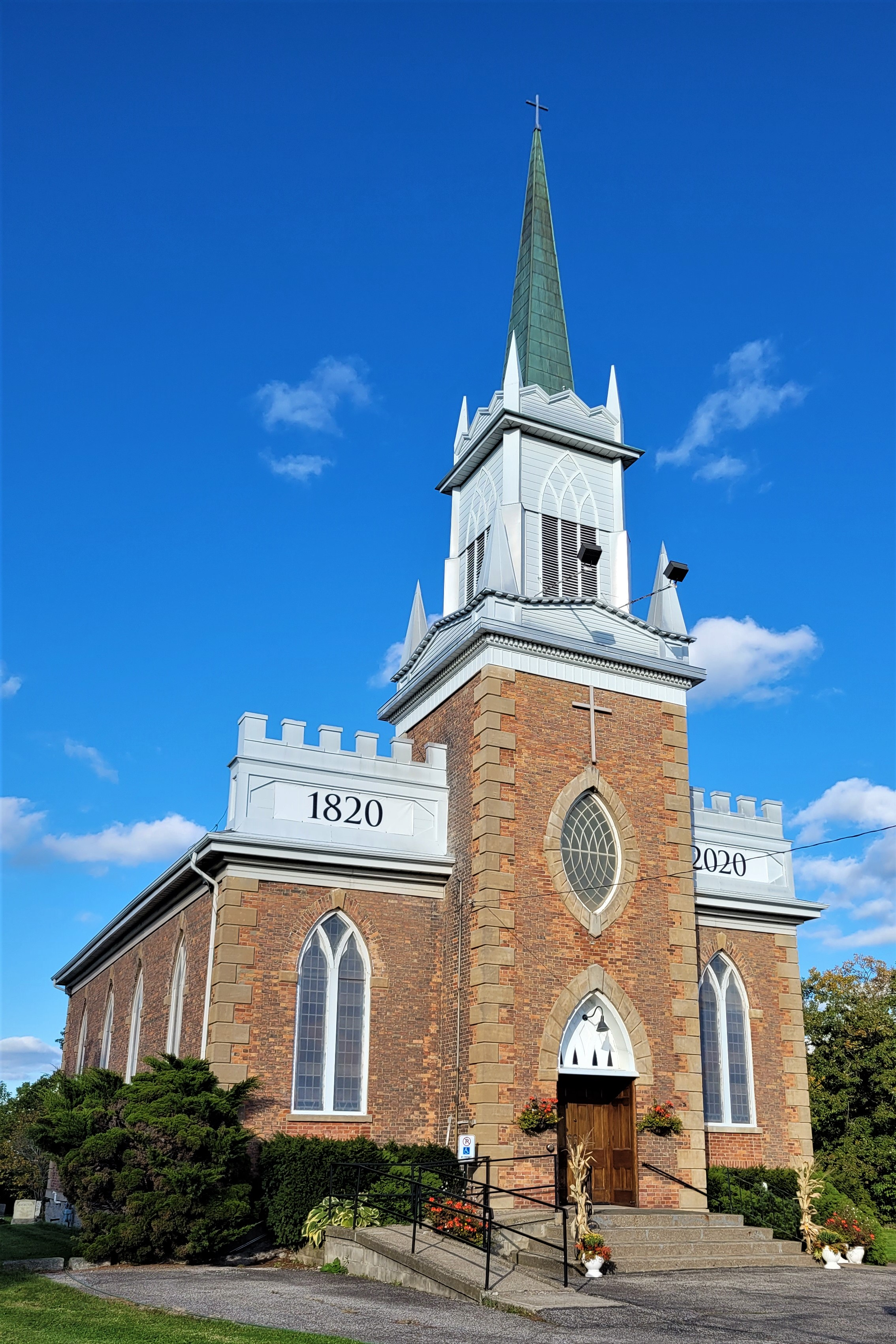
Holy Trinity Church, founded in 1820, current building constructed in 1840.

Shipbuilding industries were established on both banks of the river before 1840. A foundry which manufactured boilers and engines was constructed at approximately the same time. Chippawa was also home to one of the largest distilleries, along with gristmills, sawmills, tanneries, and iron, brass and tin manufacturing. Later, the Norton Company began manufacturing abrasives at Chippawa.

=== Present-day industry ===
The Norton Abrasives plant still exists, now part of the Saint-Gobain corporation. This is the largest manufacturing industry in the immediate area of Chippawa. Residents are also able to get their groceries from the local Foodland grocery store.

=== Hydroelectric power ===
Being above Niagara Falls, Chippawa is the location of water intakes to electric power plants located below the falls. The Welland River is used as an intake from the Niagara River to feed a power canal originating west of the village, leading to reservoirs on the Niagara Escarpment above Queenston. This diversion actually causes the Welland River to flow backwards from its natural direction, taking water out of the Niagara River. Reconfiguration of the mouth of the Welland River to accommodate this purpose has completely eliminated the Chippawa Cut, as well as the island it had created (known as Hog's or Hogg's Island). It also eliminated the original channel of the river, which is now part of King's Bridge park. A short distance north of the village along the Niagara Parkway can be seen two monolithic structures – gates to tunnels which also carry water to the generating stations.

== Tourism ==
The Chippawa area is home to golf courses, parks, the historic field of the Battle of Chippawa, as well as attractive architecture and a quiet atmosphere located a very short distance from the extremely busy Niagara Falls. Marineland is also located just outside the village. While not home to the major hotels, Chippawa does have several smaller establishments, antiques shops, Chippawa House and Chippawa Town Hall

== Notable people ==
In addition to Laura Secord, Chippawa was also home to film director James Cameron, director of Titanic and Avatar. The village commemorates this on both its welcome sign, which is decorated with the words "Home of James Cameron", and the street sign for Parkway Drive which is decorated to look like a film strip.
