= Welland Recreational Waterway =

Water channel in Welland, Ontario, Canada

Coordinates: 43.0568°N 79.23065°W

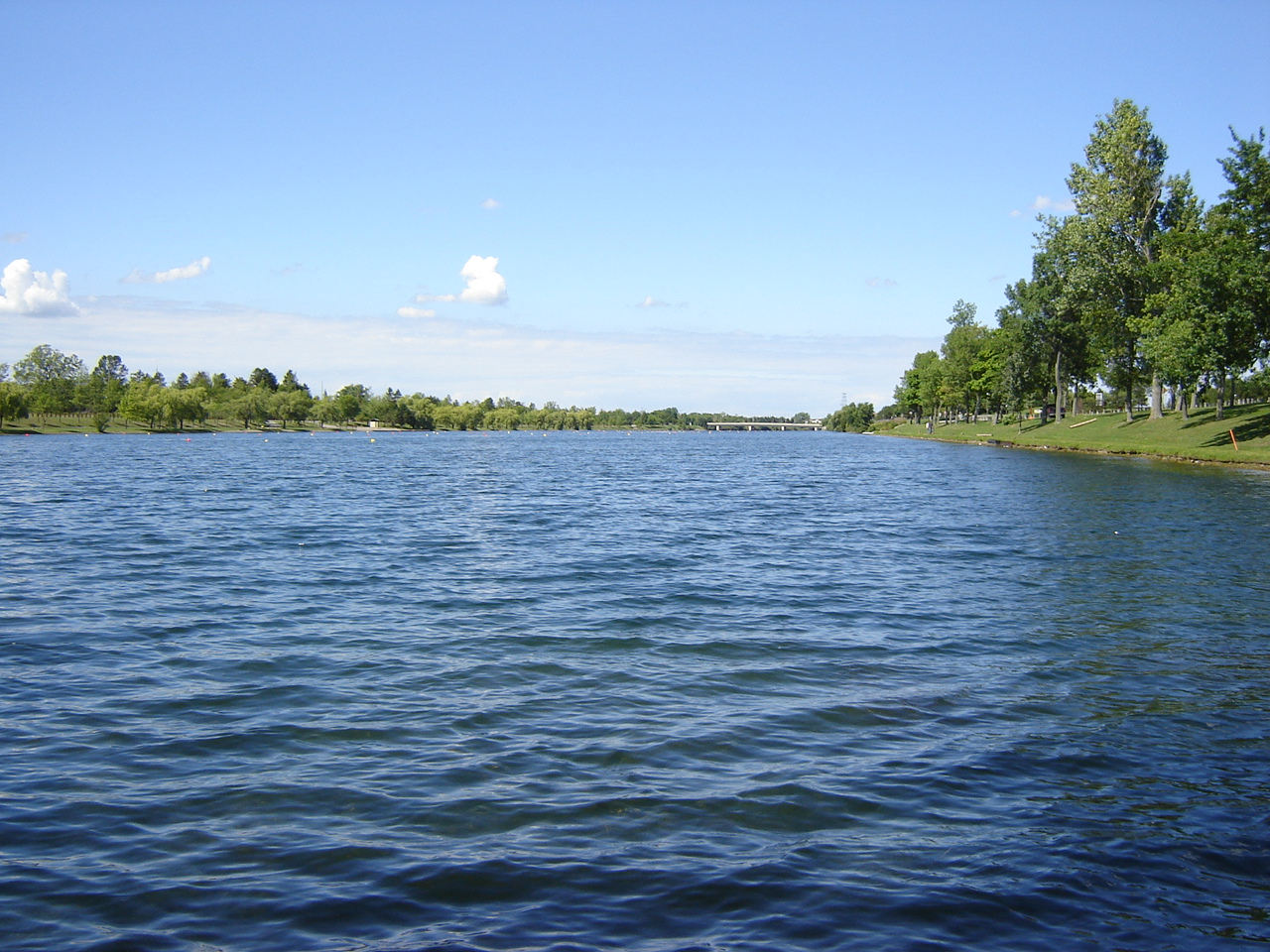
The Recreational Waterway north of the Townline Road plug.

The Welland Recreational Waterway is a water channel in the city of Welland, Ontario, Canada. It is an old alignment of the Welland Ship Canal that was unneeded for commercial traffic after the construction of the Welland By-Pass in the 1970s. The Waterway is now managed by the Welland Recreational Canal Corporation to provide enjoyment for the city's residents. Most local residents refer to it as the old canal or simply the canal.

== Original plans ==
The bottom of the canal was at a time proposed to become a roadbed for an extension of Highway 406. However, that never came to be and the old canal was retained in an almost original state with the purpose of developing several recreational facilities and tourist attractions along its shores. The plans called for fishing platforms, water slides, boat rental points, as well as marine and rail historical exhibits. To date most of these plans have not been realized, but some are in the process of being accomplished.

== Changes ==
Some changes have been made to the Waterway's original shape since the construction of the By-Pass. The most significant modification is an earth plug that bisects the Waterway along Ontario Highway 58A (between Humberstone Road and Townline Tunnel Road). This was necessary due to very long (4 km, or 2.5 miles) low-grade approaches to the Townline Tunnel required for trains to travel underneath the new canal segment.

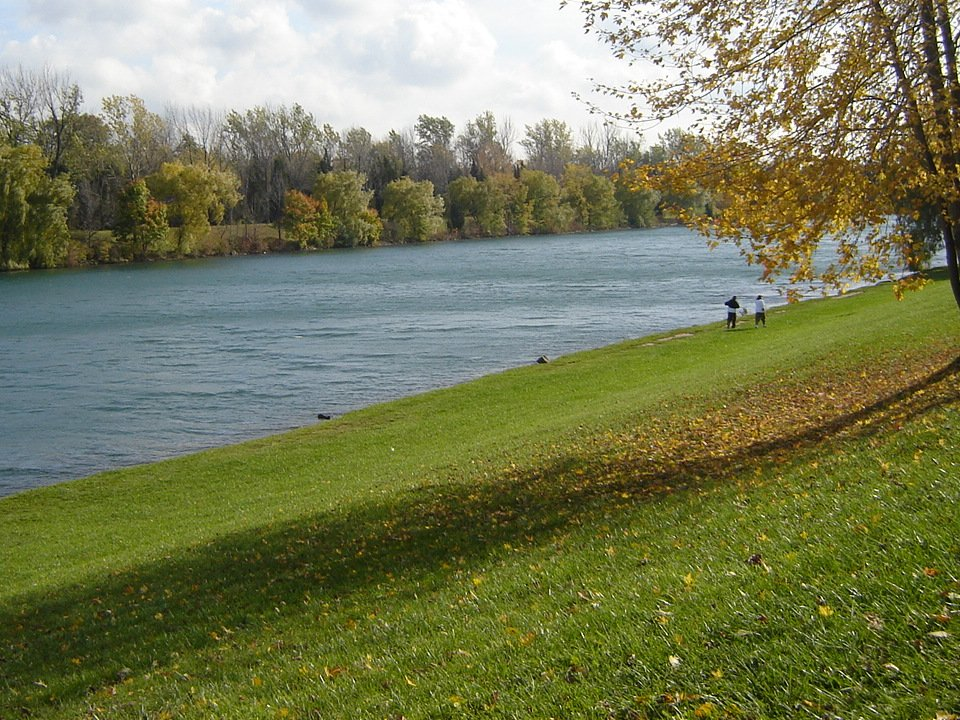
The Waterway's no-wake zone. Merritt Island with its path appear opposite the channel.

As multiple leaking problems were surfacing with the aqueduct that carries the Welland River underneath the old alignment, it was decided to control the problem by drilling intentional holes in the aqueduct. As a result, the Welland River downstream of the aqueduct is partially fed from the canal, and the flow in the northern section of the Waterway has reversed to compensate for the water flowing into the river.

The old alignment was originally spanned by five vertical lift bridges and a railroad swing bridge (bridge 15). After the relocation, two of the bridges were replaced by modern fixed-span bridges and another had its towers removed due to excessive cost of potential renovation. Two more bridges were built in the northern section of the Waterway, and a bridge was constructed in downtown Welland to twin the East Main Street bridge.

== The Waterway today ==
Today, pedestrian and bicycle pathways line both banks of the Waterway. The pathways are important components of Welland's pedestrian and bicycle transportation network, providing a safe and pleasant environment in which to move about the central part of the city. A section that is particularly popular is the path on Merritt Island, a carefully cared for, elongated strip of land created when the old alignment of the canal was constructed basically parallel to the Welland River. Signs outlining the path and listing local attractions have been erected along the paths. The equally popular 140-km Greater Niagara Circle Route (GNCR) also runs along the canal, and is used by residents and tourists alike.

Welland City Councillors placed a motorboat prohibition on the waterway known as the "Go Quietly" by-law, turning the former shipping canal into a waterway suitable for kayaking, rowing, canoeing and paddle boating.

The Welland Recreational Canal Corporation is an organization whose board of directors is made up of three members of city council and six citizens. The corporation is responsible for the protection and development of the canal and adjacent lands, and has inaugurated various programs, including a canoe/paddle boat rental facility and numerous fishing platforms.

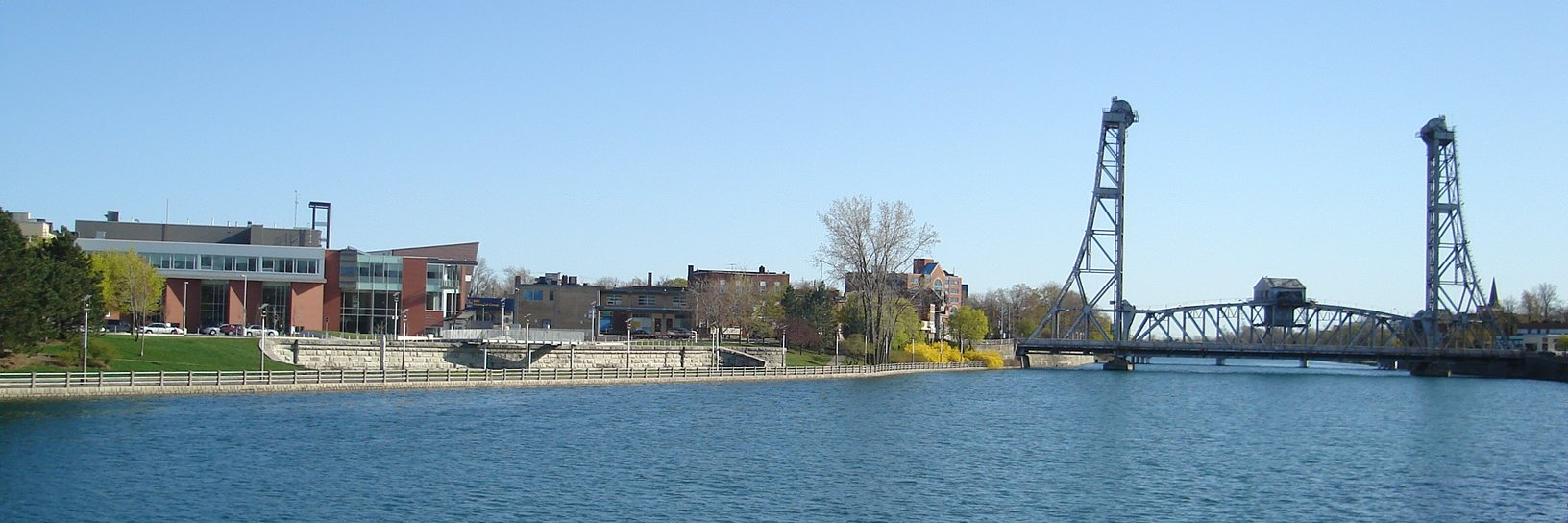
Downtown Welland, with the Waterway in the foreground, the Civic Square on the left, and the historic vertical lift East Main Street Bridge (Bridge #13) on the right.

== Future plans ==
The Waterway is seen as a crucial part of plans for revival of downtown Welland. The Civic Square, housing the city hall and the library, was newly built by the canal. The Welland Recreational Waterway Master Plan is available online and details proposals for the future of the canal.

In 2012, Bike Welland and ShortHills Cycling Club (SHCC) jointly presented a proposal to the Welland Recreational Canal Corporation (WRCC) for a 160-acre naturalized, urban park along the "northern reach" section of the Welland Canal. The land, which is embedded in the urban fabric, is already used by residents for hiking, trail running and mountain biking, and is the only section of the canal in Welland that is undeveloped. The Northern Reach Park would conserve the area for recreation and wildlife habitat, and continue to provide opportunities for hikers, runners, mountain bikers and cross-country skiers, as well as naturalists, to engage with a "natural" landscape. The proposal also outlines the potential of the park for sport tourism. However, it was learned that the WRCC has plans to raze the area to build a solar farm, although no public consultation has occurred and no information is available from their website or financial statements.

In 2023, it was announced that LIV Communities will build over 3,800 homes on nearly 62 hectares of land along the Waterway. It will be known as "Lock and Quay", and accessed via Towpath Ave. Construction will begin in 2026.

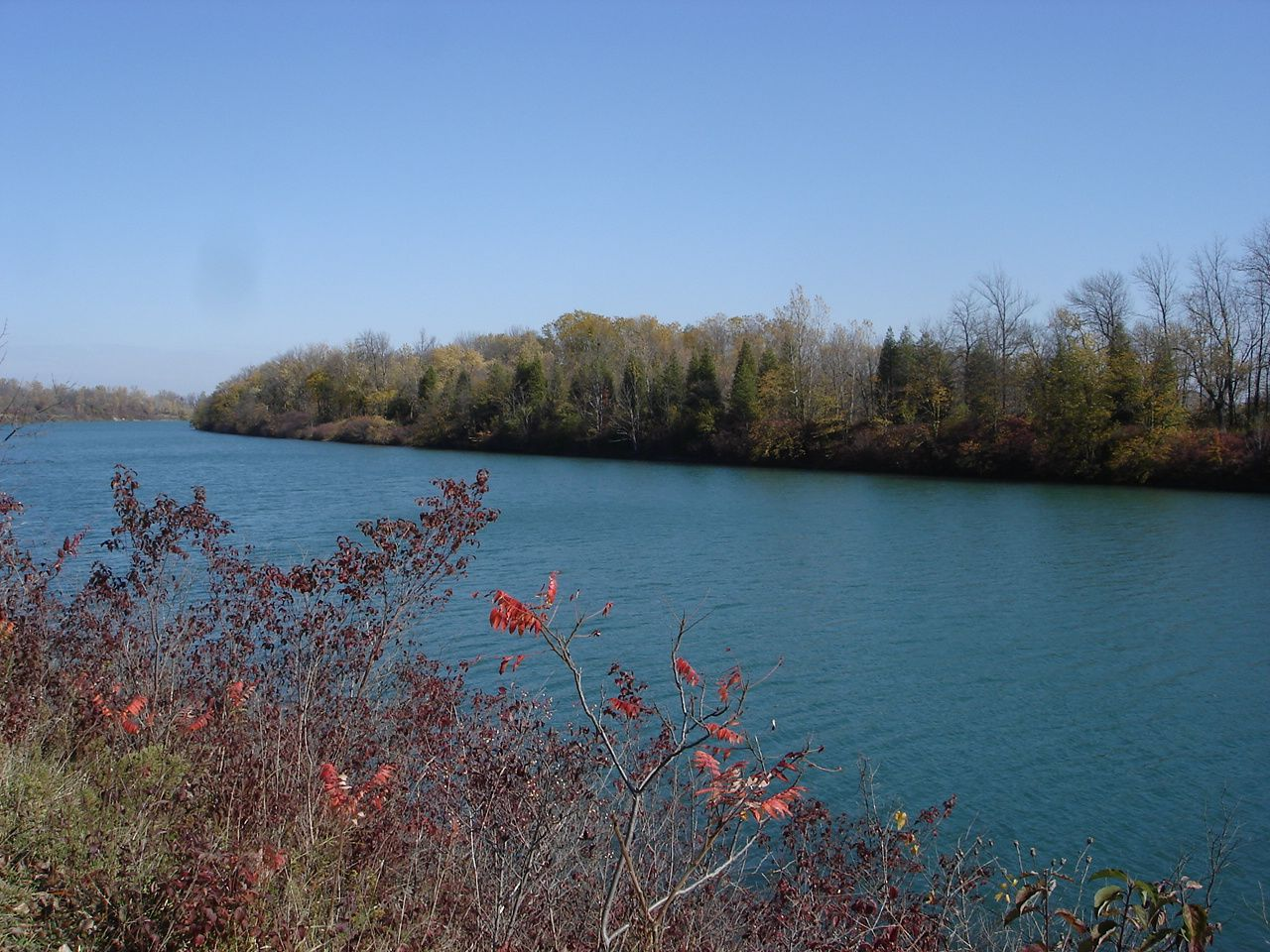
View of Merritt Island from the northern reach section of the Welland Canal.
