= Niagara, Welland and Lake Erie Railway =

Streetcar line in Welland, Ontario

Overview
- Headquarters: Welland, Ontario
- Locale: Niagara Region, Ontario, Canada
- Dates of operation: 1910–1930

Technical
- Track gauge: 4 ft 8 1/2 in (1,435 mm) standard gauge

The Niagara, Welland and Lake Erie Railway was a street railway in Welland, Ontario, which operated from 1912 until 1930.

On July 4, 1910, the Niagara, Welland and Lake Erie Railway Company was granted a 20-year franchise to operate a street railway in the Town of Welland. On April 4, 1911, the company was federally incorporated to construct an interurban railway linking Welland with Niagara Falls, Fort Erie, Port Colborne, and Port Dover, as well as to operate ferries across the Niagara River. However, this large interurban network was never constructed. Had such a network been built, it would have been in direct competition with the established Niagara, St. Catharines and Toronto Railway. The only portion ever completed was the local Welland streetcar line.

The first spike for the railway was driven by Welland mayor George Sutherland on October 4, 1911, and service began March 22, 1912. The single track line operated on 1.74 miles (2.80 km) of track from the crossing with the Grand Trunk Railway line on East Main Street, along East Main to South Main Street (now known as King Street). It operated along this street to the Canada Southern Railway station.

In 1912 and 1913, additional tracks were laid on West Main Street and North Main Street (now, Niagara Street). However, these tracks were not operated due to weight restrictions on the Alexandra Bridge over the Welland Canal (in the location of the present day Main Street lift bridge). While permission was obtained in 1915 to operate lighter cars over this bridge, such vehicles were not obtained until 1922. Service on the west side of the canal operated for only about 6 months. The distance travelled was so short that the majority of people preferred to walk, and service was cut back to the original line on the east side of the canal.

Workers traveling to the Page Hersey Tubes Ltd., located in the south end of Welland, provided much of the railway's traffic, and it is likely that Page Hersey contributed to its operating expenses. The railway had offices at 30 South Main Street (King Street) in a building known as the Weller Block. C. J. Laughlin is listed as the superintendent.

A single fare on the service was 5 cents, or 6 tickets for 25 cents. This fare remained unchanged for the entire existence of the line. The line never operated at a loss. In its peak year of 1917, the line carried over 693,000 passengers and earned profits in excess of $16,000. At the expiry of the franchise, the City of Welland was not willing to take over the service. The line ceased to operate on July 4, 1930.

== See also ==
- List of Ontario railways
