= Welland Canal Bridge 13 =

Welland Canal Bridge 13 (Welland Main Street Bridge)
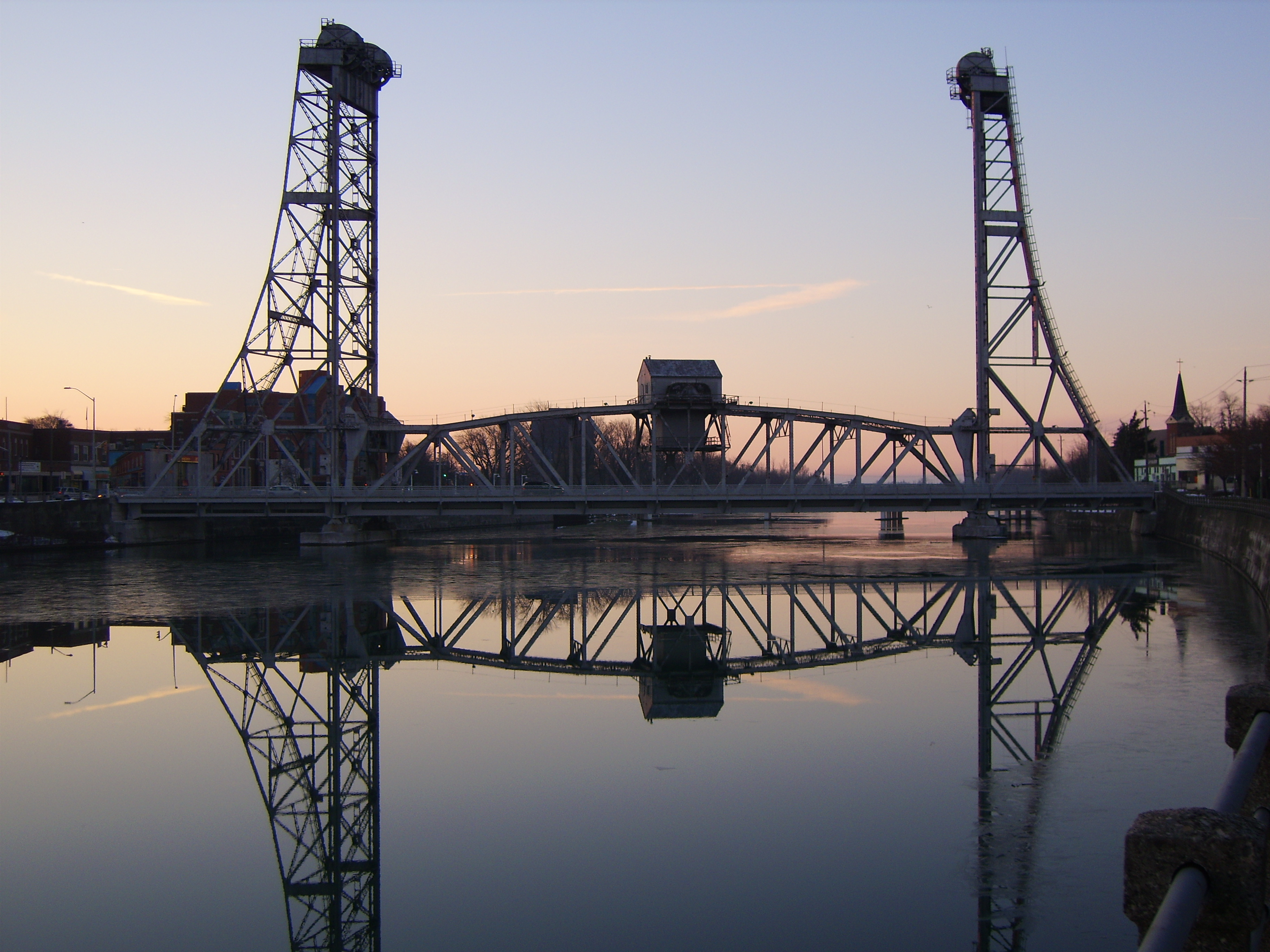
- Coordinates: 42°59′30″N 79°15′05″W
- Carries: Vehicular Traffic
- Crosses: Welland Recreational Waterway
- Locale: Welland, Ontario

Characteristics
- Design: Vertical lift bridge
- Total length: 70.6 metres (232 ft)
- Width: 9.1 metres (30 ft) (roadway width)

History
- Construction start: 1927
- Construction end: 1930
- Opened: 1930

Location
- Interactive map of Welland Canal Bridge 13 (Welland Main Street Bridge)

Welland Canal Bridge 13 (or as more commonly known locally, the Welland bridge) is a vertical lift bridge located in the heart of downtown Welland, Ontario. The bridge crosses an abandoned portion of the Welland Canal known as the Welland Recreational Waterway.

== Previous bridges at this site ==
Simple wooden swing bridge over the 2nd Welland Canal (1870)

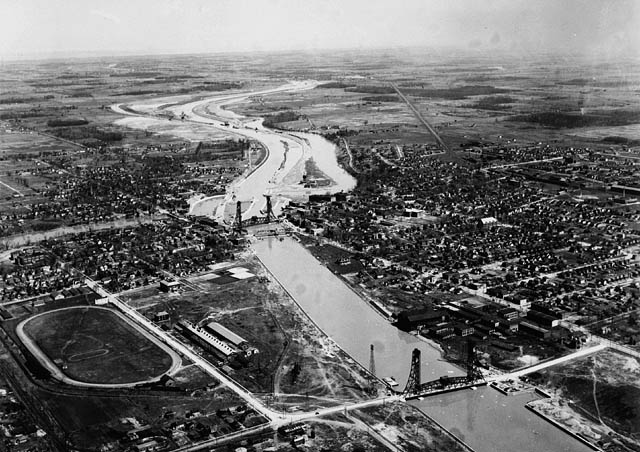
1930 Overview of Welland showing Bridge 13 in the distance with the third canal Alexandra Bridge relocated to Division Street just in front of it. The nearer vertical lift bridge is Bridge 14 (Lincoln Street)

The channel passing under this bridge is the fourth Welland Canal. A bridge has existed at this location ever since the first canal was constructed. The bridge is the location of a major historical intersection in the original roads of the Niagara Peninsula. As well as being important to local traffic in Welland, the bridge also links East Main Street (leading towards Niagara Falls) and West Main Street (providing access to roads leading along the Welland River to Wainfleet and Wellandport. It also provides a link between Niagara Street (formerly known as North Main Street leading to Thorold and St. Catharines, and King Street (formerly South Main Street, and also Canal Street), formerly leading to the Canada Southern Railway station, and on to Port Colborne.

The Chippawa Road (as Main Street was then known) crossed the First Welland Canal (constructed between 1824 and 1829) via a wooden swing bridge with the pivot set to one side of the canal. This was turned manually by pushing on heavy wooden beams extending from the end of the bridge.

The bridge over the Second Welland Canal (constructed 1840 to 1845) is recorded in at least one image (shown at left), which has been seen in several books, in the Welland Library and on a post card. This was a swing bridge of a design common to other locations on the second canal. It can be seen from the picture that the pivot was to the west of the canal. These bridges were painted white and operated manually.

The Third Welland Canal was constructed between 1871 and 1881 and located slightly west of the second. The bridge over this canal was constructed one block south of Main Street at Division Street. This situation severed the primary commercial artery and caused hardship for local business. In winter when the canal was closed, a floating plank bridge, just 1.2m (4 feet) wide allowed pedestrian access across the canal at Main Street, but significant pressure was placed on officials to build a permanent bridge at this location. Eventually, a bridge known as the Alexandra Bridge was built at Main Street in 1903. This Bridge is well documented at the Welland Public Library Local History Site. In 1927, this bridge was moved one block south to Division Street to make room for construction of the current Bridge 13.

== Construction ==
While the previous three canals were each at slightly different locations, the width of the greatly expanded fourth canal encompassed all of them. Fourth canal construction started as early as 1913. There were delays as a result of World War I, and this massive project was not completed until 1932.

Bridge 13 was constructed between 1927 and 1930, with steel work of the span being constructed on temporary pilings driven into the canal bed during the winter of 1929-30 (while the shipping season was closed). The bridge was built by the Dominion Bridge Company, with most of the steel work being completed by members of the Mohawk First Nation, who have a long history of being some of the finest ironworkers in North America.

The bridge was the most expensive on the canal, with a construction cost of $986,363. The bridge is 9.1 metres (30 ft) wide - significantly wider than most canal bridges. It was designed to carry a streetcar track down the middle, but the Welland streetcar system (the Niagara, Welland and Lake Erie railway) was slated for abandonment before the bridge was actually opened and this track was never installed.

The bridge is 70.6 metres (232 ft) long and has a skew of approximately 22.5 degrees - meaning that the towers and span are off square by this amount. The reason that the skew is required can be seen from the old picture of the second canal bridge above - the canal does not run at a 90 degree angle to Main Street. While a bridge out of alignment with the road was acceptable in the 1840s, a straight road was considered essential in the 1920s. No other canal bridge is skewed to this degree.

== Operation and incidents ==
During its operational life, the bridge carried three lanes of traffic - two westbound (the middle lane being designated as through traffic to West Main Street and the right for a turn onto Niagara Street), and one eastbound lane, which was required to turn right onto King Street as East Main street has been one-way westbound since at least the mid-1950s.

The bridge is located on a curve in a congested area of the canal. This led to several incidents over the years. Ships failing to negotiate the curve, on at least a couple of occasions, collided with the western approach span. The Welland Public Library holds a file of newspaper clippings regarding such collisions, including one where the ship Atomena collided with the bridge in 1970.

== The last ship ==
The route through Welland which had crossed Main Street since the 1830s was winding and difficult. The large number of bridges, and especially a railroad swing bridge (Welland Canal, Bridge 15) made the route difficult and dangerous.

In 1967, it was decided to re-route the canal to the east of the city via the Welland By-Pass. Construction proceeded through the 1972 shipping season, and by the end of that season, work was close to completion. In the late evening hours of December 15, 1972, the Main Street Bridge raised to allow the passage of the Georgian Bay - officially the last ship through the city of Welland. In fact, the bridge was raised again the next day to allow a St. Lawrence Seaway service vessel to pass, but the Georgian Bay remains the official last passage under the bridge in most historical records.

== After the last ship ==
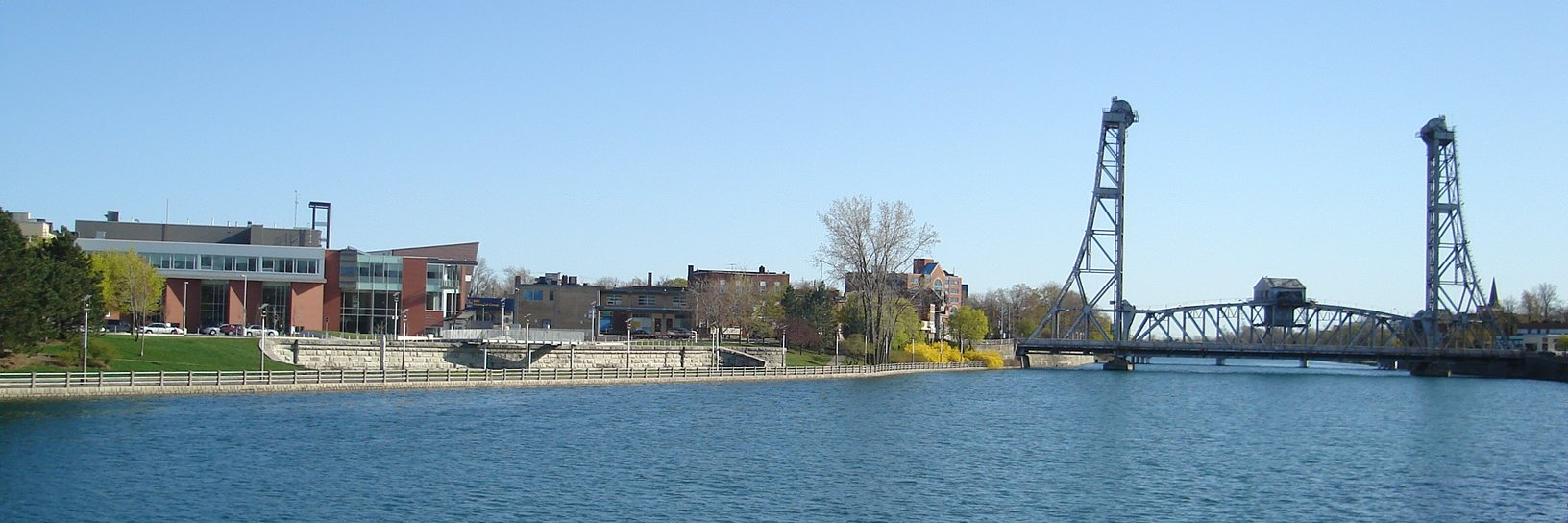
Downtown Welland, with Bridge 13 on the right, and the rear of the new Welland Civic Square on the left. The stone structure at the edge of the water is the aqueduct from the second Welland Canal

Following the closure of the canal at the end of the 1972 shipping season, Bridge 13 was locked permanently in the lowered position. The stairs leading to the control cabin were removed to prevent trespassing and vehicular traffic continued to cross the bridge, without interruption from passing ships.

In 1981, a parallel bridge was built at Division Street, and the Main Street bridge became a one-way road carrying west-bound traffic only. The original three lanes were reduced to two wider lanes of traffic.

The concrete counterweights continued to hang over the road, and as time went on, they began to decay and drop chunks of concrete on the road below. Initially, they were encased in plywood boxes, but eventually, it was deemed necessary to remove them. In 1983, the bridge was closed to traffic and a contractor was brought in to lower, then break up the counterweights. The closure caused significant traffic issues, and after a period of time, the City of Welland decided to temporarily change the adjacent Division Street Bridge to two way traffic

In 2006, the bridge was once again closed to traffic for several months to allow for major re-construction of the structural elements. This was part of a three-year overhaul program on the bridge which was completed in late 2008. Another closure occurred in 2014 to allow for repainting and preservation of the entire structure.

== The bridge today, and the neighbourhood around it ==
The bridge has become the symbol of the City of Welland. Even though the bridge towers no longer serve any practical purpose, their preservation has been given a priority owing to their historical significance.

Welland is making a concerted effort to revitalize the downtown area. The new Civic Square is just a block to the east of the bridge, and an observation platform built beside the canal offers views of the bridge. Nevertheless, business has not flocked back to the downtown area. With the closure of many Welland industries and the resultant increase in numbers of persons in need, the downtown area has become home to organizations such as Goodwill and similar service groups, as opposed to significant private enterprise.

A community volunteer initiative restored a small park along the west bank of the Welland Recreational Canal, just south of Bridge 13. The volunteers named the space "Guerrilla Park", which hosted an Art in the Park event featuring local artists.

Recommendations for development of the bridge include installing elevators to provide access to the top of the towers as a lookout. Whatever historical significance the bridge has, it remains primarily a utilitarian transportation corridor linking major east, west, north and south corridors in the city.

The bridge has recently undergone a full structural re-coating rehabilitation in the summer of 2014. New LED lighting fixtures have been mounted on the bridge which can change colours to mark special holidays or occasions.
