= Welland =

- City (lower-tier)
- City of Welland
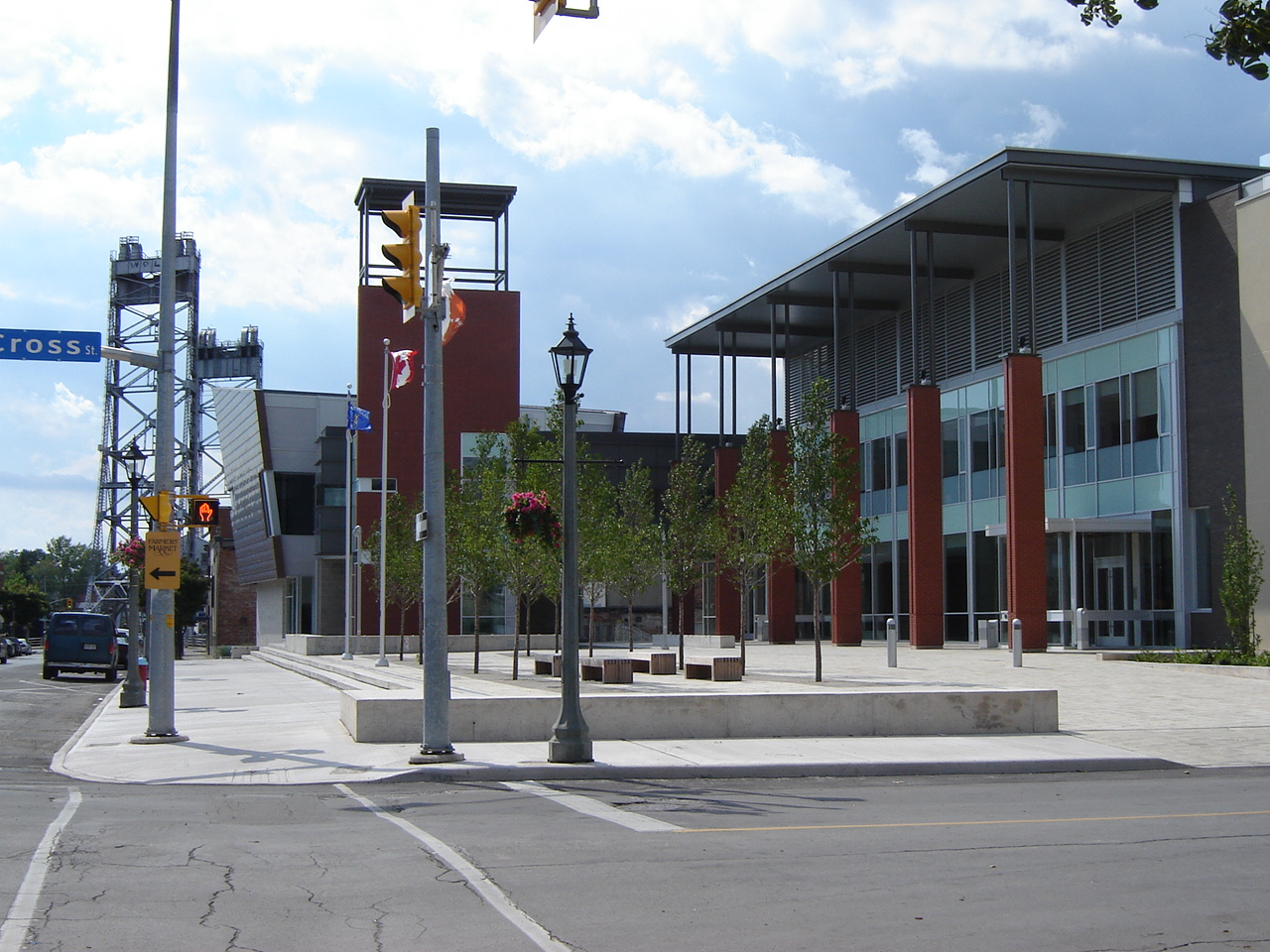
- The Welland Civic Square

- Coat of arms
- Nickname: The Rose City
- Motto: Where Rails and Water Meet
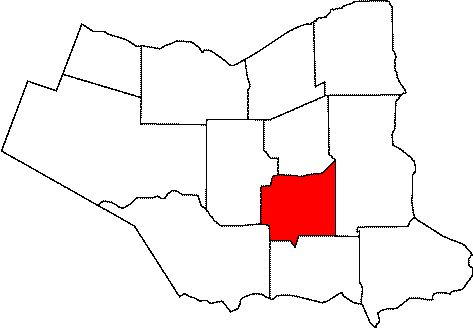
- Location of Welland in the Niagara Region

- Location in Southern Ontario
- Coordinates: 42°59′N 79°14′W
- Country: Canada
- Province: Ontario
- Region: Niagara
- Settled: 1788; 238 years ago
- Incorporated (village): 1858; 168 years ago
- Incorporated (city): 1917; 109 years ago

Government
  - Mayor: Pat Chiocchio
  - Mayor: Welland City Council
  - MP: Fred Davies (Conservative)
  - MPP: Jeff Burch (New Democratic)

Area
  - Land: 81.04 km^{2} (31.29 sq mi)
- Elevation: 175.30 m (575.1 ft)

Population (2021)
  - Total: 55,750
  - Density: 645.3/km^{2} (1,671/sq mi)
- Time zone: UTC−5 (EST)
  - Summer (DST): UTC−4 (EDT)
- Forward Sortation Area: L3B, L3C
- Area code: 905 / 289 / 365 / 742
- Highways: Highway 406; Highway 140
- Website: welland.ca

Welland is a city in the Regional Municipality of Niagara in Southern Ontario, Canada. As of 2021, it had a population of 55,750.

The city is in the centre of Niagara and located within a half-hour driving distance to Niagara Falls, Niagara-on-the-Lake, St. Catharines, and Port Colborne. It has been traditionally known as the place where rails and water meet, referring to the railways from Buffalo to Toronto and Southwestern Ontario, and the waterways of Welland Canal and Welland River, which played a great role in the city's development. The city has developed on both sides of the Welland River and Welland Canal, which connects Lake Erie and Lake Ontario.

== History ==
The area was settled in 1788 by United Empire Loyalists who had been granted land by the Crown to compensate for losses due to property they left in the British Thirteen Colonies during and after the American Revolutionary War.

Tensions continued between Great Britain and the newly independent United States, and the War of 1812 broke out. On 19 October 1814, Canadian forces led by George Hay, 8th Marquess of Tweeddale, met an American raiding party, numbering approximately nine hundred, near the eastern edge of the present community during the Battle of Cook's Mills. After an intense skirmish, the Americans retreated to Buffalo, New York. Cook's Mills was the second to last engagement of the War of 1812 on Canadian soil.

The First Welland Canal was extended in 1833 to reach Lake Erie and has influenced development of this city ever since. A wooden aqueduct was built to carry the Welland Canal over the Welland River at what is now downtown Welland, and the area became known as simply Aqueduct. A lock to cross from the canal to the river and vice versa was also built. A small shantytown soon developed around the facility, providing essential services in what was a convenient stop-over location for travellers and workers on the canal.

The growing town was later named Merrittsville, after William Hamilton Merritt, the initiator of the Welland Canal project. This name is reflected in the name of the Merrittville Highway (Niagara Road 50), which served as the primary north–south route in central Niagara before the construction of Highway 406. Welland gained its present name when it was incorporated on 25 July 1858. It became a city in 1917.

One of the few railway crossings across the canal was near Welland. Together with the canal, these two factors attracted the development of heavy industry in Welland. In 1906 the Plymouth Cordage Company was the first major industrial company to open a plant in Welland. By the 1930s, Welland was an important industrial city in the region and was developing rapidly.

In the 1960s, the city was starting to outgrow the canal passing through its core. The Welland By-Pass project, started in 1967 and finished in 1973, provided a new, shorter alignment for the Welland Canal by moving it from downtown Welland to the city's outskirts. With the completion of the bypass, Welland's east end (and the former town of Crowland) was like an island between the new and old canal channels.

The City of Welland is working to revitalize the downtown core through an ongoing community improvement plan. Integral to the program is the use of incentives to promote revitalization and redevelopment. A report published by the City of Welland in 2013 said, "for over 10 years now, these programs have produced only very moderate uptake and development since being introduced." Other former industrial cities have grappled with similar painful transitions.

== Government ==
The Welland city council is made up of 12 councillors, each elected in his or her ward (this is known as election by single-member districts). Each of the six wards in Welland elects two councillors. It is led by the mayor, who is elected at-large, by all the voters in the city. Welland's current mayor is Frank Campion.

In addition, two regional councillors are elected at-large, to participate in the Niagara Regional Council. These councillors were George Marshall and the late Peter Kormos, who died in March 2013. Another representative of Welland was appointed to fill Kormos's seat since late May 2013, in order to represent the city on the Regional Council.

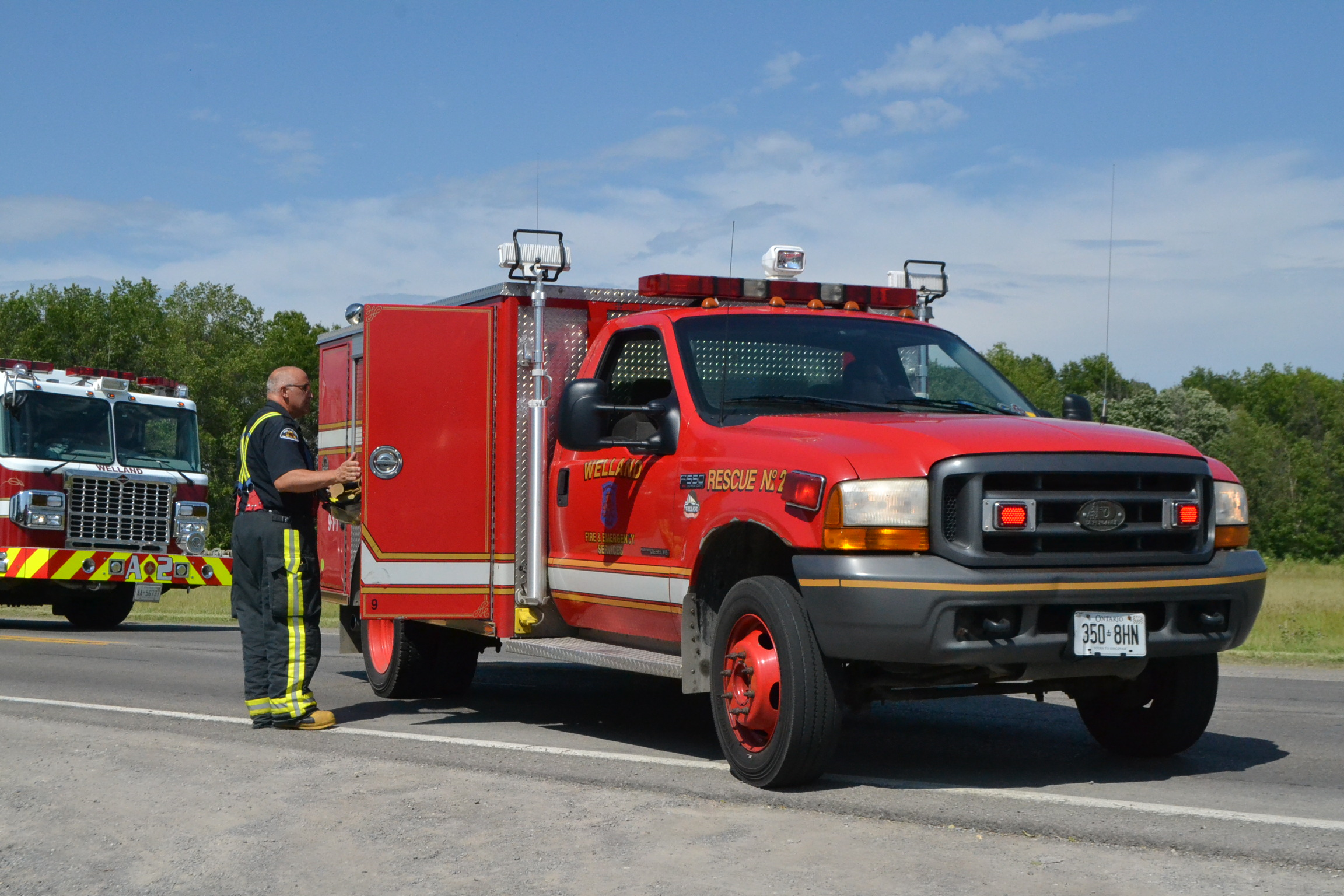
Welland firefighters responding to a road accident.

The city is responsible for fire protection, libraries, parks and recreation and secondary streets, but many municipal services come from the broader level of government, the Niagara Region. Regional responsibilities include social welfare, community health, and policing through the Niagara Regional Police.

The chief local political issue is the redevelopment of the downtown core, which has deteriorated in the years after the Welland By-Pass project. The Civic Square project has been completed after spanning the terms of three city councils and three mayors. The new building, facing both East Main Street and the old canal, houses the city hall and the Welland Public Library. The project is proving to be a catalyst for development, as several new establishments have been opened downtown and some businesses are expanding.

Welland is represented in the House of Commons of Canada by the Conservative Party Member of Parliament Fred Davies, and in the Legislative Assembly of Ontario by the NDP Member of Provincial Parliament Jeff Burch, representing the federal riding of Niagara South and the provincial riding of Niagara Centre, respectively.

== Demographics ==
Historical populations
| Year | Pop. | ±% |
|---|---|---|
| 1871 | 1,110 | — |
| 1881 | 1,870 | +68.5% |
| 1891 | 2,035 | +8.8% |
| 1901 | 1,863 | −8.5% |
| 1911 | 5,318 | +185.5% |
| 1921 | 8,654 | +62.7% |
| 1931 | 10,709 | +23.7% |
| 1941 | 12,421 | +16.0% |
| 1951 | 15,382 | +23.8% |
| 1961 | 36,079 | +134.6% |
| 1971 | 44,397 | +23.1% |
| 1981 | 45,448 | +2.4% |
| 1991 | 47,914 | +5.4% |
| 2001 | 48,402 | +1.0% |
| 2006 | 50,331 | +4.0% |
| 2011 | 50,631 | +0.6% |
| 2016 | 52,293 | +3.3% |
| 2021 | 55,750 | +6.6% |

According to the 2021 census conducted by Statistics Canada, Welland had a population of 55,750 living in 23,656 of its 24,530 total private dwellings, a change of 6.6% from its 2016 population of 52,293. With a land area of 81.16 km^{2} (31.34 sq mi), it had a population density of 686.9/km^{2} (1,779.1/sq mi) in 2021.

=== Ethnicity ===
In 2021, 87.0% of the population was white/European, 8.7% were visible minorities and 4.3% were Indigenous. The largest visible minority groups were Black (2.6%), South Asian (1.6%), Latin American (1.3%), Filipino (0.7%), Southeast Asian (0.5%), and Chinese (0.5%).

Panethnic groups in the City of Welland (2001−2021)
| Panethnic group | 2021 | | 2016 | | 2011 | | 2006 | | 2001 | |
| Panethnic group | Pop. | % | Pop. | % | Pop. | % | Pop. | % | Pop. | % |
|---|---|---|---|---|---|---|---|---|---|---|
| European (Note: Statistic includes all persons that did not make up part of a visible minority or an indigenous identity.) | 47,855 | 87.04% | 46,790 | 90.85% | 46,580 | 93.04% | 46,865 | 93.93% | 45,535 | 95.46% |
| Indigenous | 2,365 | 4.3% | 2,005 | 3.89% | 1,545 | 3.09% | 1,185 | 2.37% | 835 | 1.75% |
| African | 1,435 | 2.61% | 810 | 1.57% | 710 | 1.42% | 655 | 1.31% | 545 | 1.14% |
| South Asian | 855 | 1.56% | 305 | 0.59% | 115 | 0.23% | 170 | 0.34% | 175 | 0.37% |
| Latin American | 695 | 1.26% | 395 | 0.77% | 460 | 0.92% | 355 | 0.71% | 140 | 0.29% |
| Southeast Asian (Note: Statistic includes total responses of "Filipino" and "Southeast Asian" under visible minority section on census.) | 650 | 1.18% | 195 | 0.38% | 275 | 0.55% | 200 | 0.4% | 65 | 0.14% |
| East Asian (Note: Statistic includes total responses of "Chinese", "Korean", and "Japanese" under visible minority section on census.) | 575 | 1.05% | 590 | 1.15% | 270 | 0.54% | 380 | 0.76% | 320 | 0.67% |
| Middle Eastern (Note: Statistic includes total responses of "West Asian" and "Arab" under visible minority section on census.) | 250 | 0.45% | 235 | 0.46% | 55 | 0.11% | 60 | 0.12% | 75 | 0.16% |
| Other/multiracial (Note: Statistic includes total responses of "Visible minority, n.i.e." and "Multiple visible minorities" under visible minority section on census.) | 310 | 0.56% | 170 | 0.33% | 60 | 0.12% | 40 | 0.08% | 10 | 0.02% |
| Total responses | 54,980 | 98.62% | 51,500 | 98.48% | 50,065 | 98.88% | 49,895 | 99.13% | 47,700 | 98.55% |
| Total population | 55,750 | 100% | 52,293 | 100% | 50,631 | 100% | 50,331 | 100% | 48,402 | 100% |
Note: Totals greater than 100% due to multiple origin responses

Industrial Migration of 1885

A significant cultural mix was established with the opening of the Plymouth Cordage plant when many workers relocated to Welland from the company's operations in Plymouth, Massachusetts were of Italian origin. To minimize the potential effects of cultural and language barriers, Plymouth Cordage sent four foremen to Welland: one was Italian, one French, one German and one English. The neighbourhood that the company built for its employees, now the Plymouth Cordage Heritage District, became the first Italian ethnic neighbourhood in Welland.

Today Welland's communities reflect francophone, Slavic, First Nations and Métis cultural influences.

| Ethnic and Cultural origins (2021) | Population | Percent |
|---|---|---|
| English | 13,060 | 23.8% |
| Irish | 9,100 | 16.6% |
| Scottish | 9,000 | 16.4% |
| Canadian | 8,935 | 16.3% |
| French n.o.s | 8,240 | 15.0% |
| German | 6,885 | 12.5% |
| Italian | 6,825 | 12.4% |
| Dutch | 3,450 | 6.3% |
| Ukrainian | 2,825 | 5.1% |
| Hungarian | 2,705 | 4.9% |
| Polish | 2,350 | 4.3% |
| British Isles n.o.s | 2,035 | 3.7% |
| Caucasian (White) n.o.s+ European n.o.s | 1,875 | 3.4% |
| French Canadian | 1,585 | 2.9% |
| Welsh | 1,195 | 2.2% |
| First Nations (North American Indian) n.o.s.+ North American Indigenous, n.o.s. | 1,260 | 2.3% |
| Métis | 1,045 | 1.9% |
Note: "n.o.s" = not otherwise specified. Respondents could report more than one ethnic origin.

=== Language ===
80.2% of residents spoke English as a mother tongue. French was the first language of 7.2% of the population, compared to 3.3% in all of Ontario. In terms of non-official languages, the most common mother tongues were Italian (2.1%), Spanish (1.0%), Hungarian (0.6%), Polish (0.6%), Korean (0.4%), German (0.4%) and Chinese languages (0.4%). 1.5% of residents listed both English and French as mother tongues, while 1.2% listed both English and a non-official language.

Canada Census Mother Tongue - Welland, Ontario
| Census | Total | English | | | French | | | English & French | | | Other | | |
| Year | Responses | Count | Trend | Pop % | Count | Trend | Pop % | Count | Trend | Pop % | Count | Trend | Pop % |
| 2021 | 55,410 | 44,445 | ▲8.3% | 80.2% | 3,980 | ▼16.4% | 7.2% | 835 | ▲77.7% | 1.5% | 5,360 | ▲6.0% | 9.7% |
| 2016 | 51,705 | 41,040 | ▲4.5% | 79.4% | 4,760 | ▼8.7% | 9.2% | 470 | ▲20.5% | 0.9% | 5,055 | ▲1.4% | 9.8% |
| 2011 | 50,230 | 39,260 | ▲4.1% | 78.2% | 5,215 | ▼8.5% | 10.4% | 390 | ▲25.8% | 0.8% | 4,985 | ▼19.4% | 9.9% |
| 2006 | 49,895 | 37,700 | ▲5.4% | 75.6% | 5,700 | ▲0.4% | 11.4% | 310 | ▼32.6% | 0.6% | 6,185 | ▲6.8% | 12.4% |
| 2001 | 47,705 | 35,775 | ▲3.2% | 75.0% | 5,680 | ▼7.8% | 11.9% | 460 | ▲17.9% | 1.0% | 5,790 | ▼5.8% | 12.1% |
| 1996 | 47,730 | 34,650 | n/a | 72.6% | 6,160 | n/a | 12.9% | 390 | n/a | 0.8% | 6,145 | n/a | 12.9% |

=== Religion ===
62.4% of residents were Christian, down from 77.2% in 2011. 35.1% were Catholic, 15.1% were Protestant, 7.7% identified as Christian without specifying and 4.5% belonged to other Christian denominations or Christian-related traditions. 34.9% were non-religious or secular, up from 22.0% in 2011. All other religions accounted for 2.3% of the population, up from 0.8% in 2011. The largest non-Christian religions were Islam (0.9%), Hinduism (0.4%) and Sikhism (0.4%).

== Education ==
Like the rest of Ontario, Welland has access to four public education systems: the regional school boards are the Niagara Catholic District School Board and the District School Board of Niagara. The Conseil scolaire Viamonde (the French public board) and the Conseil scolaire catholique MonAvenir (the French Catholic board) also operate schools in Welland.

The Niagara Catholic District School Board operates six elementary schools within the city. The board also operates one secondary school in the city: Notre Dame, which offers Grade 9 through to Grade 12. Continuing education courses are also offered by the board at its Father Patrick H. Fogarty Learning Centre within the city.

The District School Board of Niagara operates ten elementary schools within the city and two secondary schools: Welland Centennial Secondary School servicing the western side of the city and Eastdale Secondary servicing the eastern side.

A campus of Niagara College of Applied Arts and Technology is located in Welland. The college offers post-secondary diplomas, baccalaureate degrees and advanced-level programs. From 1995 to 2001, the city was home to a satellite campus of the defunct francophone Collège des Grands-Lacs.

== Economy ==
Welland, because of its proximity to the Sir Adam Beck hydroelectric station at Niagara Falls, was historically known for its steel, automotive, and textile industries. Initially, manufacturing firms were the biggest employers in Welland. The plants of companies like Union Carbide, United Steel, Plymouth Cordage Company, three drop forges, a cotton mill, and the Atlas Steel Co., as well as general manufacturing plants, had a big influence on shaping early Welland. While recent years saw the end of Welland operations for several companies, such as John Deere which announced in September 2008 that it would be closing its plant and relocating manufacturing to Wisconsin and Mexico, businesses such as Lakeside Steel (a pipe plant formerly owned by Stelco, since 2012 owned by JMC Steel) continues to employ residents.

The Atlas Steel Co. was founded at some time in the 1920s. Roy H. Davis and partners bought the Welland plant from its American shareholders in 1928. Gun barrels were produced here during the second World War. It was for a time Canada's largest manufacturer of stainless steel. The plant housed a vacuum smelter line, necessary for the production of Titanium. The onset of the CanAm FTA, NAFTA, GATT and globalization brought decline, and subsequently the ownership changed hands numerous times: the Sammi group acquired it in 1989, followed by Slater Steels of Mississauga in 2000, who went bankrupt in 2003. The plant was finally torn down in 2007.

The Canadian branch plant of the Plymouth Cordage Company was started in 1904 due to Parliament's initiation of a 25% import duty on rope and related products. Plymouth, with roots in Massachusetts, moved to secure its business in binding twine, necessary to package farm crops such as grass, wheat or straw. The city of Welland grew up around the Plymouth plant, which was prior to 1904, farmland. The cordage industry was a victim of the harvester-thresher, which obviated the need for binding (or baling) twine, as the threshing operation is now performed in a contiguous step immediately when the stalk is cut.

Welland's electricity comes from the Sir Adam Beck hydroelectric generation plants at Niagara Falls via Welland Hydro. Thanks to the presence of the massive plant, power remained on in over half of Welland during the 2003 North America blackout until rolling blackouts began the next day in an effort to provide power to areas that hadn't had it for nearly 24 hours.

== Geography ==
Welland is located in the centre of south Niagara. Over the years, urban growth has all but united the northwest part of Welland with the community of Fonthill.

Prior to the Welland By-Pass project, the Welland Canal cut through the centre of Welland. As a result, a very prominent split was created between the east side and the west side of the city. The west side grew primarily to the north, while the east side expanded south. The west side also became the more affluent of the two. Today, even though the canal traffic no longer causes regular interruption in the traffic across the city, the channel lives on as Welland Recreational Waterway. The waterway still serves as a very prominent visual feature dividing the city, and it is perhaps for this reason that the east side/west side division is still very much alive in the minds of Wellanders. East side and west side are very commonly used as basic directions.

The communities of Cooks Mills and Dain City have their own separation stories. Cooks Mills, located on the other side of the By-Pass channel than the rest of Welland, has arguably been protected against the impact of urban sprawl, but the necessity of using one of the two highway tunnels to cross the canal causes some residents to head to nearby Niagara Falls instead. Dain City, located in the south of the city where the two channels meet, is separated by the massive approaches to the Townline Tunnel required to provide the low grade for the rail lines that use the tunnel. Dain City was built for, and by, the Dain Manufacturing Company (Now known as John Deere), the main employer in the area, as a "company town." John Deere announced in September 2008 that it would be closing its plant and relocating manufacturing to Wisconsin and Mexico.

There is a slight movement to develop the northern end of the east side, an undeveloped area. A community named Hunters Pointe is being built close to the banks of the By-Pass, and the area received further investment when a new Wal-Mart store opened on Woodlawn Road close to Highway 406.

Technically, both the east side and Dain City are peninsulas, surrounded by the waters of the old and new channels of the Welland Canal and connected to "solid" ground only by the relatively small plug in the old canal along the Townline Tunnel approaches.

Crowland is a former township created in 1788 that grew up around Ontario Road and Welland Recreational Canal. A man-made geographic feature is the Merritt Island, a strip of land approximately five kilometres long and, in some places, less than 100 metres wide. The island was created when the alignment of the First Welland Canal was constructed basically parallel to the Welland River and since the abandonment of the old canal has been established as Merritt Park, featuring a popular four kilometre-long paved trail.

=== Climate ===
Welland experiences a humid continental climate (Köppen Dfa/Dfb) typical of the Great Lakes region, with cold, snowy winters, mild, wet springs, warm to hot, humid summers, and cool, wet falls. The winter is the driest season, with no more than 77.8 mm (3.06 in.) of precipitation in its wettest month. Though, due to lake-effect snow, the city receives, on average, 97.8 cm (38.5 in.) of snow every winter. The average temperature in January, the coldest month, is −4.7 °C (23.5 °F). Spring is mild (13 °C (55.4 °F) on average) and rainy (240.3 mm (9.46 in.) of rain in April, May and June, also with 5.4 cm (2.12 in.) of snow in April and May). Summer is warm, with an average high temperature of 24.5 °C (76.2 °F) and, humid, with 251 mm (9.88in.) of total rainfall. Autumn is cool (average temperature of 4.3 °C (39.7 °F)) and wet (actually, the wettest of Welland's seasons) (273.7 mm 10.8 in.) of total precipitation. The extreme high and low temperatures are 37.8 °C (100 °F), recorded on 4 July 1911; 1 July 1931; 26 August 1948, and −32.8 °C (-27 °F), recorded on 25 January 1884. Daily precipitation extremes include a rainfall of 118.4 mm (4.66 in.) on 30 September 1959, and a snowfall of 81.3 cm (32.0 inches) on 1 March 1900. One of the worst winter storms to affect the Welland area was in January 1977 when the Blizzard of '77 hit Niagara and Western New York from 28 January to 1 February 1977.

Climate data for Welland, ON (1991–2020 normals, extremes 1872–2020)
| Month | Jan | Feb | Mar | Apr | May | Jun | Jul | Aug | Sep | Oct | Nov | Dec | Year |
|---|---|---|---|---|---|---|---|---|---|---|---|---|---|
| Record high °C (°F) | 20.0 (68.0) | 20.5 (68.9) | 27.0 (80.6) | 32.5 (90.5) | 34.0 (93.2) | 36.1 (97.0) | 37.8 (100.0) | 37.8 (100.0) | 35.0 (95.0) | 32.2 (90.0) | 25.6 (78.1) | 20.6 (69.1) | 37.8 (100.0) |
| Mean daily maximum °C (°F) | −0.1 (31.8) | 0.6 (33.1) | 5.4 (41.7) | 12.5 (54.5) | 19.7 (67.5) | 24.5 (76.1) | 26.8 (80.2) | 26.1 (79.0) | 22.4 (72.3) | 15.4 (59.7) | 8.6 (47.5) | 3.0 (37.4) | 13.7 (56.7) |
| Daily mean °C (°F) | −4.1 (24.6) | −3.8 (25.2) | 0.7 (33.3) | 7.1 (44.8) | 13.7 (56.7) | 19.0 (66.2) | 21.5 (70.7) | 20.7 (69.3) | 17.0 (62.6) | 10.6 (51.1) | 4.5 (40.1) | −0.7 (30.7) | 8.9 (48.0) |
| Mean daily minimum °C (°F) | −8 (18) | −8.2 (17.2) | −4 (25) | 1.6 (34.9) | 7.8 (46.0) | 13.5 (56.3) | 16.2 (61.2) | 15.4 (59.7) | 11.5 (52.7) | 5.7 (42.3) | 0.4 (32.7) | −4.2 (24.4) | 4.0 (39.2) |
| Record low °C (°F) | −32.8 (−27.0) | −31.1 (−24.0) | −27.8 (−18.0) | −18.3 (−0.9) | −6.1 (21.0) | 1.1 (34.0) | 3.9 (39.0) | 0.5 (32.9) | −2.2 (28.0) | −8.9 (16.0) | −20 (−4) | −27.8 (−18.0) | −32.8 (−27.0) |
| Average precipitation mm (inches) | 81.6 (3.21) | 52.8 (2.08) | 70.3 (2.77) | 83.1 (3.27) | 81.0 (3.19) | 85.7 (3.37) | 84.0 (3.31) | 78.7 (3.10) | 96.0 (3.78) | 88.5 (3.48) | 83.7 (3.30) | 81.6 (3.21) | 967.0 (38.07) |
| Average rainfall mm (inches) | 49.6 (1.95) | 25.8 (1.02) | 41.2 (1.62) | 72.8 (2.87) | 84.2 (3.31) | 78.8 (3.10) | 88.3 (3.48) | 82.6 (3.25) | 101.5 (4.00) | 88.8 (3.50) | 85.3 (3.36) | 45.3 (1.78) | 844.2 (33.24) |
| Average snowfall cm (inches) | 43.9 (17.3) | 23.7 (9.3) | 28.0 (11.0) | 4.7 (1.9) | 0.0 (0.0) | 0.0 (0.0) | 0.0 (0.0) | 0.0 (0.0) | 0.0 (0.0) | 0.4 (0.2) | 8.7 (3.4) | 31.7 (12.5) | 141.0 (55.5) |
| Average precipitation days (≥ 0.2 mm) | 17.9 | 13.8 | 14.7 | 14.8 | 14.5 | 14.2 | 13.6 | 12.8 | 12.6 | 14.3 | 14.1 | 15.6 | 172.8 |
| Average rainy days (≥ 0.2 mm) | 6.8 | 4.7 | 8.2 | 12.8 | 14.0 | 11.6 | 11.4 | 11.6 | 11.5 | 12.6 | 11.8 | 8.7 | 125.4 |
| Average snowy days (≥ 0.2 cm) | 9.4 | 5.7 | 5.2 | 1.3 | 0.0 | 0.0 | 0.0 | 0.0 | 0.0 | 0.13 | 2.4 | 5.8 | 29.9 |
Source: Environment Canada

=== Parks ===
Notable parks are Chippawa Park, an older, well-developed park in the northwest; Memorial Park, a newer park in the southeast which has been shrunk for suburban development; and Merritt Island Park along the canal with an upper level paved trail and lower level gravel trail.

Chippawa Park has rolling hills, mature specimen trees (predominantly Carolinian, including several species of Hickory and Maple), playgrounds, a large pond, and small ornamental fish pond in a formal rose garden. It features a large war memorial carved from Lacasse granite and designed by a famous Canadian sculptor, Elizabeth Wyn Wood.

Memorial Park was a project of the 1967 Centennial. It is very flat with younger trees. It has an outdoor pool shaped like a figure 8. There is also a cenotaph at this park. In the late 1960s, the eastern part of the park was used for the Welland Canal bypass. Patrons of the park can often see ships passing through the bypass.

At the heart of the old city of Welland, near the Main Street Bridge, the Welland River passes under the old Welland Canal, then runs parallel to it for a few miles. Between the old canal and the river lies a long narrow strip of land referred to as Merritt Island that is now a park. The end of the park closest to the centre of the city has picnic tables and playground equipment. The island also includes a main trail that follows the bank of the old canal for the entire length of the park, with a variety of intermittent side paths and trails.

Also located in the heart of downtown, between Main Street and Division Street bridges along the west side of the Welland Recreational Waterway, is a small parkette dubbed "Guerrilla Park" by locals. It was originally park space that had become neglected over years and was reclaimed as public space by volunteers. Through efforts of local artists and guerrilla gardening, the formerly neglected space is now tended by various unorganized volunteers, and features revitalized garden beds and flowers, outdoor paintings, and occasional impromptu events.

=== Welland Canal trails ===
The Welland Canal Parkway Trail is a paved recreational path beginning in the City of St. Catharines at Lake Ontario and ending at Lake Erie in Port Colborne. The sections of the trail located within Welland are paved. The trail follows alongside the Welland ship and Recreational Canals, and passes through downtown Welland.

== Transport ==
=== Welland Canal ===
The Welland Canal, linking Lake Ontario with Lake Erie, is the transportation mode that Welland is best known for. Until 1972, the canal passed through downtown Welland. As of the end of the 1972 shipping season, the canal was re-routed via the Welland Canal Bypass east of the city. Welland clings to its canal heritage, as evidenced by the steadfast preservation of the Main Street Lift Bridge (Welland Canal, bridge 13) shown in the photograph above.

=== Roads ===
Highway 406 is the main route in and out of Welland, leading north to Thorold, St. Catharines and onwards via Queen Elizabeth Way.

Port Colborne is linked to Welland by Highways 140 and 58. Port Colborne residents then can take the 406 further north.

The Mid-Peninsula Highway, once constructed, can play an important role in the transportation patterns of Welland, as it might cross the Welland Canal along the Highway 58A corridor in the south of the city. Should that occur, Highway 406 will likely be extended to reach the new thoroughfare.

Two of the three tunnels under the canal, Main Street Tunnel and Townline Tunnel, are located in Welland, just east of the main urbanised area.

=== Railways ===
Welland boasts a rich railway history. The city motto is "Where Rails and Water Meet," referring to the two prevalent means of transportation. The Canada Southern Railway (CASO) passed through the south end of Welland, with a passenger station on King Street. The CASO operated very few trains of its own – the majority of traffic on the line consisted of New York Central Railway trains transiting between Windsor, Ontario (and the tunnel to Detroit), and one of two bridges over the Niagara River located at Niagara Falls and Fort Erie.

Welland was also the terminus of the Toronto, Hamilton & Buffalo Railway's track (the link to Buffalo, New York being via the CASO line). The T, H & B ran joint passenger trains with the New York Central to provide through service between Toronto and Buffalo (via Hamilton, Ontario and Welland).

There was also a Canadian National Railways (earlier, Grand Trunk Railway) line running in a north–south direction and crossing the CASO line at Welland Diamond. An interlocking tower (WX) stood here. Another line ran through the Dain City area of south Welland. This was the Canada Air Line Railway, and was also used by the Wabash Railway. Later, it became the Cayuga Subdivision of the Canadian National Railway.

Lastly, the Niagara, St. Catharines and Toronto Railway provided electric radial service from Port Colborne, Ontario to Thorold, Ontario via Welland. Passenger service ended in November 1959, but the tracks remained in freight use until 1981 when a trestle over the Welland River became unsafe and the line was removed from service.

The relocation of the Welland Canal in the early 1970s caused massive changes in the local railway network. The new route of the canal was previously crossed by five separate railway lines. The new segment of canal would have no bridges, and just one railway tunnel, so all of these routes required redesign. The two branches of the CASO line, plus the Cayuga Subdivision were re-routed through the Townline Tunnel, while the North/South Canadian National line was split and discontinued as a through route. The station at King Street was abandoned and demolished. It was replaced by a new station outside of town, but passenger service ended soon after.

Today, Welland is the location of one of only two remaining railway crossings that span the Welland Canal. The Townline Tunnel is built for three railway tracks, but the centre track was removed in the early 1990s. Now, only two tracks run through the tunnel. The north track is the Canadian Pacific Railway Hamilton subdivision. The south track was formerly the Canadian National Railway Cayuga subdivision. Since the abandonment of the majority of that subdivision, operations on this track were limited to occasional trains interchanging with Trillium Rail's Port Colborne Harbour Railway. Today, Canadian Pacific also uses this track as their "Brookfield Siding."

There is also a Trillium Railway (Port Colborne Harbour Railway) north–south line running through the east side of Welland on the former Welland Canal railway/Canadian National tracks beside the former site of the Atlas Specialty Steels plant (torn down in 2007). A daily as requested (Monday to Friday) train operates along this route to Merritton. Trillium Railway has a handful of industries throughout Thorold and St. Catharines, on the former Niagara, St. Catharines and Toronto trackage. No passenger trains stop in Welland – the closest Via Rail stations are in St. Catharines and Niagara Falls. Via Rail ceased operations of their own trains to these stations on 25 October 2012. Amtrak does operate 2 trains to these stations, under Via Rail control.

Prior to the Welland Canal relocation in the early 1970s, there were two bridges crossing the old canal. The busiest was a swing bridge located between the Lincoln and Broadway bridges (the CASO line). This bridge was a relic of an earlier canal, and although it does not swing any longer, it remains in railway use. Once or twice per week, a local Trillium Rwy way freight crosses this bridge to access Vesuvius Industries on the west side of the old canal located on Trillium Rwy's West Welland Spur. The second crossing was as vertical-lift bridge at Dain City, Ontario which also remains in use as the Trillium Rail Canal line. Prior to 1967, this section of The Canal line was referred to as CN's Cayuga Subdivision. The Cayuga Subdivision was then re-routed through the Townline Tunnel, which is to the north of Dain City. This section through Dain City was renamed the Canal Subdivision from this location at CN Welland Diamond, where it connects to the north–south trackage (former CN Welland Subdivision). This east-west trackage head continues to this day westward to a rail junction the by-pass of what is now operated as Trillium's Cayuga Spur, (Former location 3 miles away, west of Phillip's Road where the original ground of the CN Cayuga Subdivision continued onto St. Thomas, ON. Do note that CP Brookfield Siding becomes Trillium's Cayuga Spur where the Feeder Canal once cross through, prior to the building of this Townline Tunnel infrastructure, in the 1800s. This Cayuga Subdivision by-pass runs from between Wilhelm Road and Troup Road, east of Welland and to the west between Phillip's Road (mentioned above) Green Road S,(Formerly Farr Road S.). In total, the Cayuga Subdivision by-pass was a total length of 8.9 miles.

A recent initiative proposed by local businessmen and politicians, in particular Trillium Railway owner Wayne Ettinger and former mayor Damian Goulbourne calls for the planned GO Train extension into the Niagara Region to include a station — and cross the Welland Canal — in Welland rather than St. Catharines. The proponents argue that an adequate rail line is already in place and using the Trillium's track through the Townline Tunnel would allow for uninterrupted train traffic to Niagara Falls. They also point out that a station in Welland would fit in the Niagara Region's "Grow South" policy of expanding the infrastructure south of the Niagara Escarpment.

=== Air ===
The closest airport to Welland is the Welland/Niagara Central Airport on the western edge of the city. It is a small field airport and is not served by any regular links, but it is an international point of entry. However, the airport is under a number of developments in hopes to expand its services. For now, most air travellers use either Toronto's Pearson Airport, Bishop Airport or Hamilton's Munro Airport. The Buffalo Niagara Airport is the closest, although it requires that travellers cross the American border. Another option for Wellanders is St. Catharines/Niagara District Airport with flights to Toronto's Bishop Airport, on FlyGTA Airways as well as various charter flights to/from Niagara.

=== Public transit ===
Between 1912 and 1930, local streetcar service was provided in Welland by the Niagara, Welland and Lake Erie railway which operated on East Main Street and King Street (then known as South Main Street). This company also provided a short-lived service on West Main Street and Niagara Street (then known as North Main) for about 6 months in 1922.

From 1973 to 2022, Welland Transit operated the public transport service of scheduled bus services and paratransit covering the city. Also provided was Welland-St. Catharines Connection, a link to the St. Catharines public transit system from Niagara College to Brock University terminal in St. Catharines, with the first and last run of the day interconnecting to the downtown core. Service was also provided to Port Colborne and Pelham.

In 2023, Niagara Region Transit acquired Welland Transit, along with St. Catharines Transit and Niagara Falls Transit. Services remain largely unchanged with the exception of extended service hours and changes to the fare structure.

== Events ==
The Concerts on the Canal series provides a line-up of free Friday night summer concerts on the floating stage at Merritt Park.

Niagara Regional Exhibition, running since 1853, is held at the Fairgrounds in the north end of the city every fall. Tradition stands that on at least one of the operational days it will rain.

Canada Day Celebrations has become a local favourite event. The free family fun event is hosted in downtown Welland at Merritt Park.

The Farmers' Market, held downtown in the Market Square, features 80+ vendors offering food, Niagara wines, produce and homemade items every Saturday morning, year-round.

Welland's Eastdale High School held its 50th Anniversary Reunion on 20, 21 and 22 May 2011. The Welland High and Vocational School Reunion was held 15/16 May 2009 in Welland.

The Welland Dragon Boat Festival, takes place in June.

The Welland Rose Festival is one of Niagara's longest running festivals. The Rose Festival promotes and encourages community participation through many events such as the Rose Parade, Baby Show, Rose Show, Days in the Park, and more. Celebrating 50 years in 2011, the Rose Festival continues to offer a host of spectacular events and entertainers in the month of June.

The city will host the 2018 Canoe Polo World Championships at the Welland International Flatwater Centre.

Welland FloatFest began in 2016 and usually occurs for one day in July. The aim of the event is to encourage participants to enjoy the Welland Recreational Waterway by use of an inflatable. The event is complemented with vendors and a concert. In 2017, FloatFest gained a Guinness World Record for a line of touching inflatables that extended 165 metres in the canal to make it into the record book.

The Welland Zombie Walk is a community-based event held in October for the past several years.

== Notable people ==
- Stacey Allaster – former chair, Women's Tennis Association
- Attack in Black – Alternative Band
- Paul Beeston – former president of Major League Baseball and former president of the Toronto Blue Jays.
- Paul Bissonnette – colour commentator and former NHL hockey player, and Barstool Sports podcaster for Spittin' Chiclets
- Ken Breitenbach – former Buffalo Sabres Hockey Player (NHL)
- Nina Bunjevac – cartoonist
- Cal Clutterbuck – former NHL player having played for the Minnesota Wild and New York Islanders
- Yvon Corriveau – retired NHL hockey player (Washington, Hartford)
- Brian Daboll – Head Coach, New York Giants
- Sabrina D'Angelo - Goalkeeper for Canadian Women's National Soccer Team and Aston Villa
- Philip Demers - former professional marine mammal trainer and activist
- Andre Deveaux – professional hockey player, Florida Panthers
- Matt Ellis – Buffalo Sabres hockey player.
- Robert Hilborn Falls – Chief of the Defence Staff
- Simon Gatti – soccer player
- Daniel Girardi – Retired New York Rangers and Tampa Bay Lightning hockey player.
- Wayne Groulx – former NHL/Austrian league Hockey player
- Chris Haney – Co-inventor of "Trivial Pursuit" board game
- Curtis Harrison – actor, writer
- Mike Hominuck – player for the Toronto Rock of the NLL.
- Nathan Horton – former NHL player having played for the Florida Panthers, Boston Bruins, and Columbus Blue Jackets
- Bill Huard – former NHL Hockey Player
- Matt Johnson (ice hockey) – former NHL Hockey Player
- Peter Kormos – long-serving NDP Member of the Legislative Assembly of Ontario
- Anthony Lacavera - founder of Globalive and Wind Mobile
- Amy Ciupak Lalonde – actress
- Wesley Rose - music industry executive
- Anna Olson – host of Sugar, Fresh with Anna Olson, and Bake with Anna Olson on Food Network Canada (Born in Georgia, United States, now resides in Welland)
- Daniel Paille – Boston Bruins hockey player.
- Gilbert Parent – former Speaker of the House of Commons of Canada
- Mike Pelino – professional hockey coach
- Daniel Romano – Country and Rock musician, visual artist and leather craftsman
- Matthew Santoro – YouTube comedian and video blogger
- Mike Smrek – former NBA player (Chicago, Los Angeles, San Antonio & Golden State)
- Steve Terreberry - Guitarist and YouTuber

== In popular culture ==
Welland's Seaway Mall gained national attention when a flash mob was filmed singing the Hallelujah Chorus in the food court in November 2010. A video of the event went viral on YouTube, gaining 14.4 million views in less than a month. On 8 December, Canada AM broadcast a live performance from the same food court, drawing a crowd of about 500 people.

Welland was the site of the first scene filmed for the movie Meatballs. Actor Bill Murray appears in front of the Kmart at Seaway Mall.

The Welland International Flatwater Centre was featured on Season 9, Episode 6 of The Amazing Race Canada. Teams had to row a double scull along a 200-metre (660 ft) course on the Welland Canal within two minutes in order to receive their next clue from local rower, Rhonda Chopin. The episode aired August 15, 2023.

== See also ==
- Welland Canal, Welland By-Pass, Welland Recreational Waterway
- Battle of Cook's Mills
- Niagara College
- List of francophone communities in Ontario
