= CPR Montrose Yard =

CPR Montrose Yard is a former Canadian Pacific Railway marshalling yard in Niagara Falls, Ontario, Canada. It was originally built for the New York Central Railroad. The property is currently home to the Thundering Waters Golf Course.
