= Niagara International Airport =

Niagara Airport may refer to airports/airfields within the Buffalo-Niagara Falls metro area, of New York State, USA, and Ontario, Canada:

== In the US ==
- Buffalo Niagara International Airport (IATA: BUF, ICAO: KBUF)
- Niagara Falls International Airport (IATA: IAG, ICAO: KIAG, FAA LID: IAG)
- Niagara Falls Air Reserve Station, a US Air Force Base located adjacent to Niagara Falls International Airport

== In Canada ==
- St. Catharines/Niagara District Airport (IATA: YCM, ICAO: CYSN)
- Niagara Central Dorothy Rungeling Airport or Welland/Niagara Central Dorothy Rungeling Aerodrome, (TC LID: CNQ3)
- Niagara Falls/Niagara South Airport, (TC LID: CNF9)
