= RCAF Station Dunnville =

Former Royal Canadian Air Force station

- Ontario; Near Dunnville, Ontario in Canada
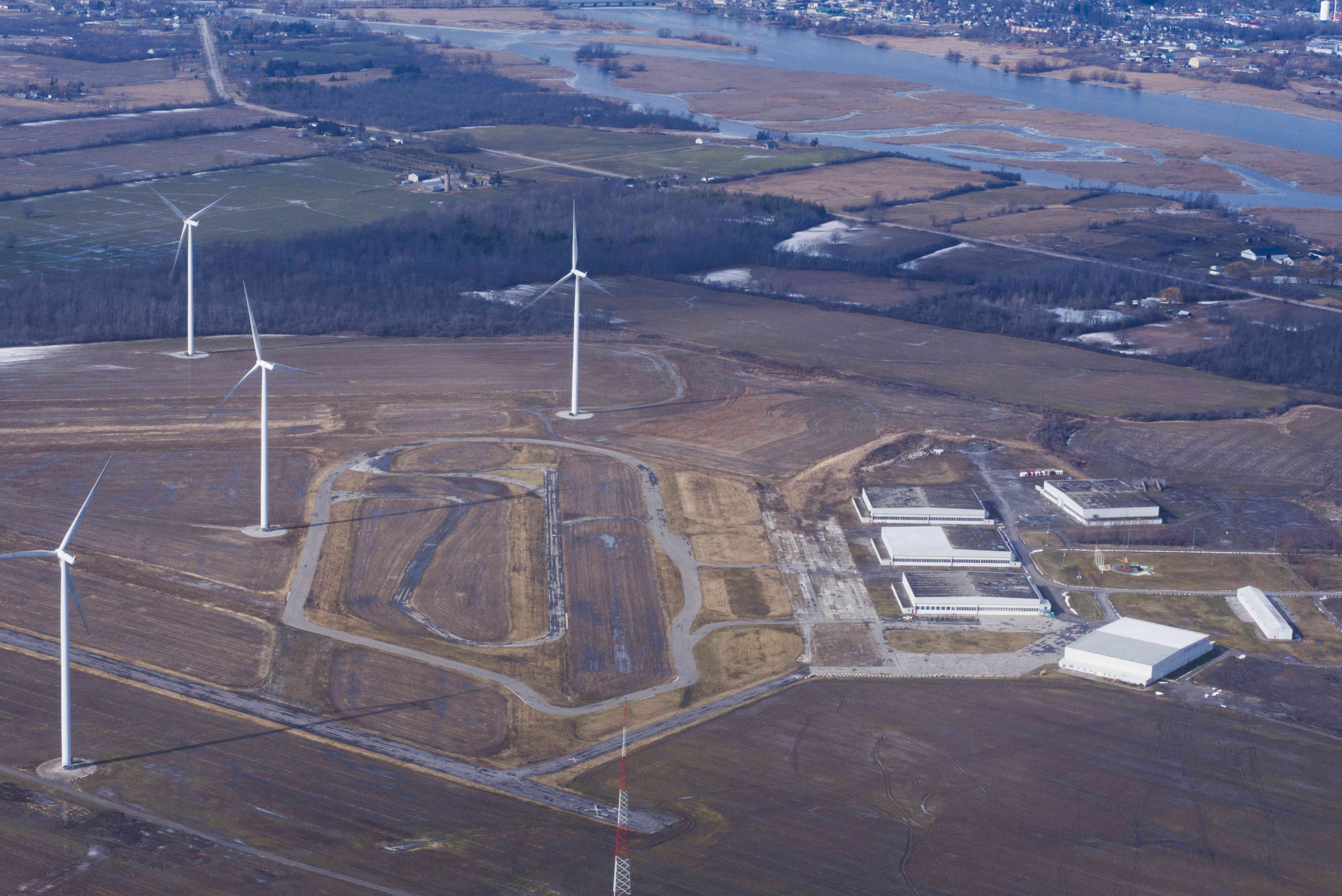
- The site of No. 6 SFTS in 2020

Site information
- Owner: Department of National Defence
- Operator: Royal Canadian Air Force
- Controlled by: No. 1 Training Command
- Website: Airfields

Location
- Location within Ontario

Site history
- In use: 1940-1944

Garrison information
- Past commanders: G/C Alan H. Hull - 1940
- Garrison: No. 6 Service Flying Training School

Airfield information
- Identifiers: IATA: none, ICAO: none
- Elevation: 605 ft (184 m) AMSL
Runways
Direction	Length and surface
5/23	2,750 ft (840 m) Hard Surfaced
5/23	2,500 ft (760 m) Hard Surfaced
10/28	3,500 ft (1,100 m) Hard Surfaced
10/28	3,000 ft (910 m) Hard Surfaced
15/33	2,600 ft (790 m) Hard Surfaced
15/33	2,400 ft (730 m) Hard Surfaced

Royal Canadian Air Force Station Dunnville was a Second World War British Commonwealth Air Training Plan (BCATP) station located near Dunnville, Ontario. The station was home to No. 6 Service Flying Training School and is usually known by that name. (Note: the standard short form is No. 6 SFTS, also shortened as 6 SFTS.) Service Flying Training Schools trained pilots, either single-engine or multi-engine, and 6 SFTS was a single-engine school. After graduation, the new pilots were assigned various duties, which might be overseas in the Royal Air Force or an RCAF squadron; or in Canada as instructors or staff pilots in the BCATP, or for duty in RCAF Home Defence squadrons.

The British Commonwealth Air Training Plan was a temporary wartime measure that ended on 29 March 1945. No. 6 SFTS opened on 25 November 1940 and closed on 1 December 1944, and during this time 2,436 airmen received their wings at Dunnville.

== Construction and operation of the school ==
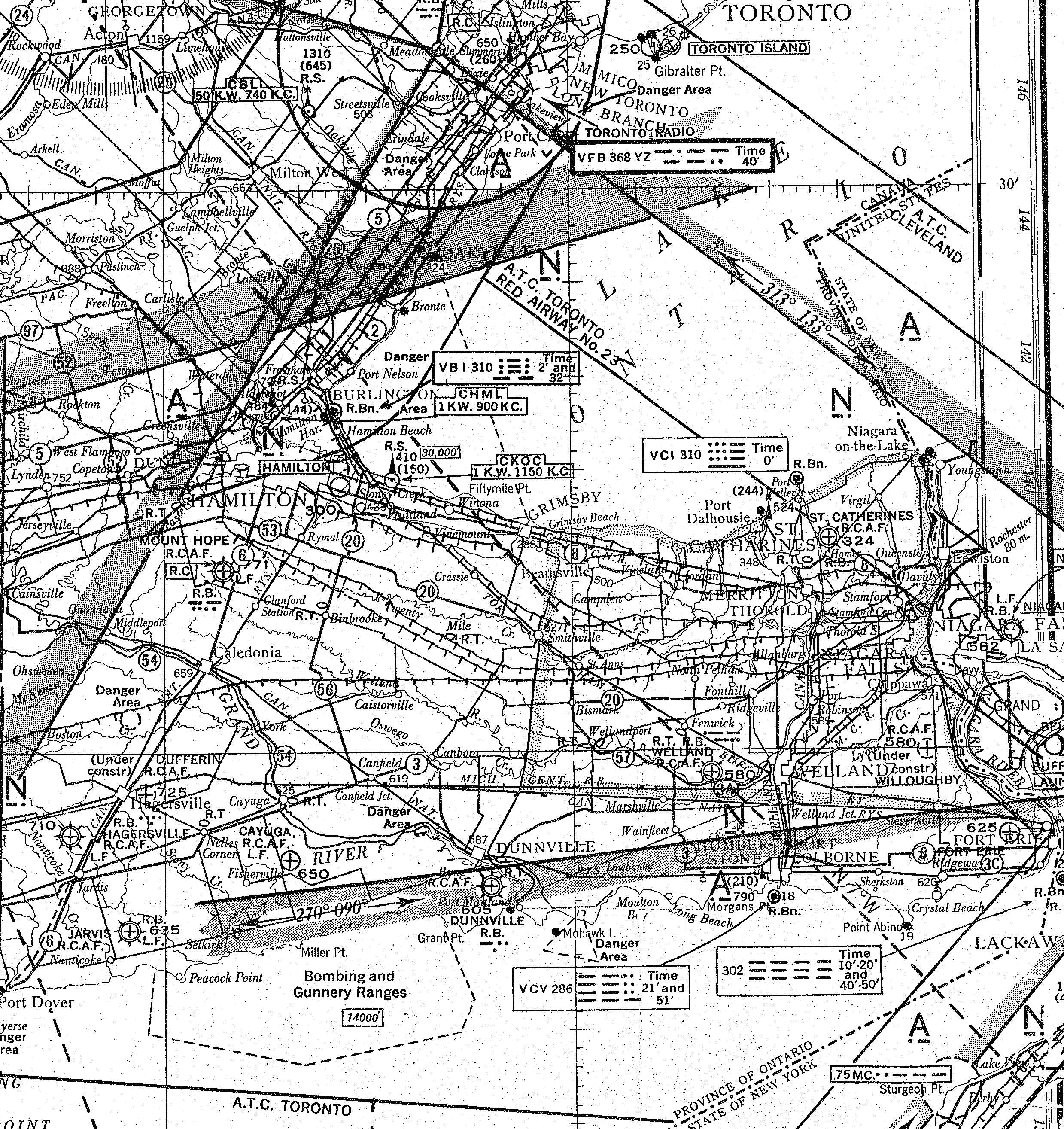
1944 Navigation chart showing RCAF Dunnville and surrounding area. North is up, Lake Erie at bottom.

Like most of the BCATP airfields, No. 6 SFTS was located in a sparsely populated rural area close to rail lines, highways, and a town. The 400-acre site for No. 6 was three kilometres south of Dunnville near the mouth of the Grand River in Lake Erie. It had a primary relief field, or R1, at RCAF Welland just five or six minutes flying time away, and within twenty-four minutes flying time there were more RCAF airfields: Brantford, Burtch, Cayuga, Dufferin, Hagersville, Jarvis, Mount Hope, St. Catharines, Tillsonburg, and Willoughby. The site lay on the air route from Buffalo, New York to Detroit, Michigan, used by American Airlines and Bell Aircraft, and the Fleet Aircraft factory was close by in Fort Erie, Ontario. This gave the pilots and trainees at Dunnville many places to land if they got lost or had a mechanical problem, but it also meant there was a lot of air traffic in the area.

The airfield used the standard Canadian equilateral triangle layout with double runways, five hangars, and a fifty-acre camp. The sports and recreation fields were on the east side of Port Maitland Road, across from the main entrance. No. 6 was one of the earliest training airfields, and its hangars were constructed of steel columns and roof trusses covered by a rough wooden frame, diagonal planking, and wooden shingles, whereas hangars built later in the program used laminated wooden columns and roof trusses. There was a bombing target eight kilometres northwest on the Grand River, and a triangular bombing and gunnery range near Mohawk Island in Lake Erie.

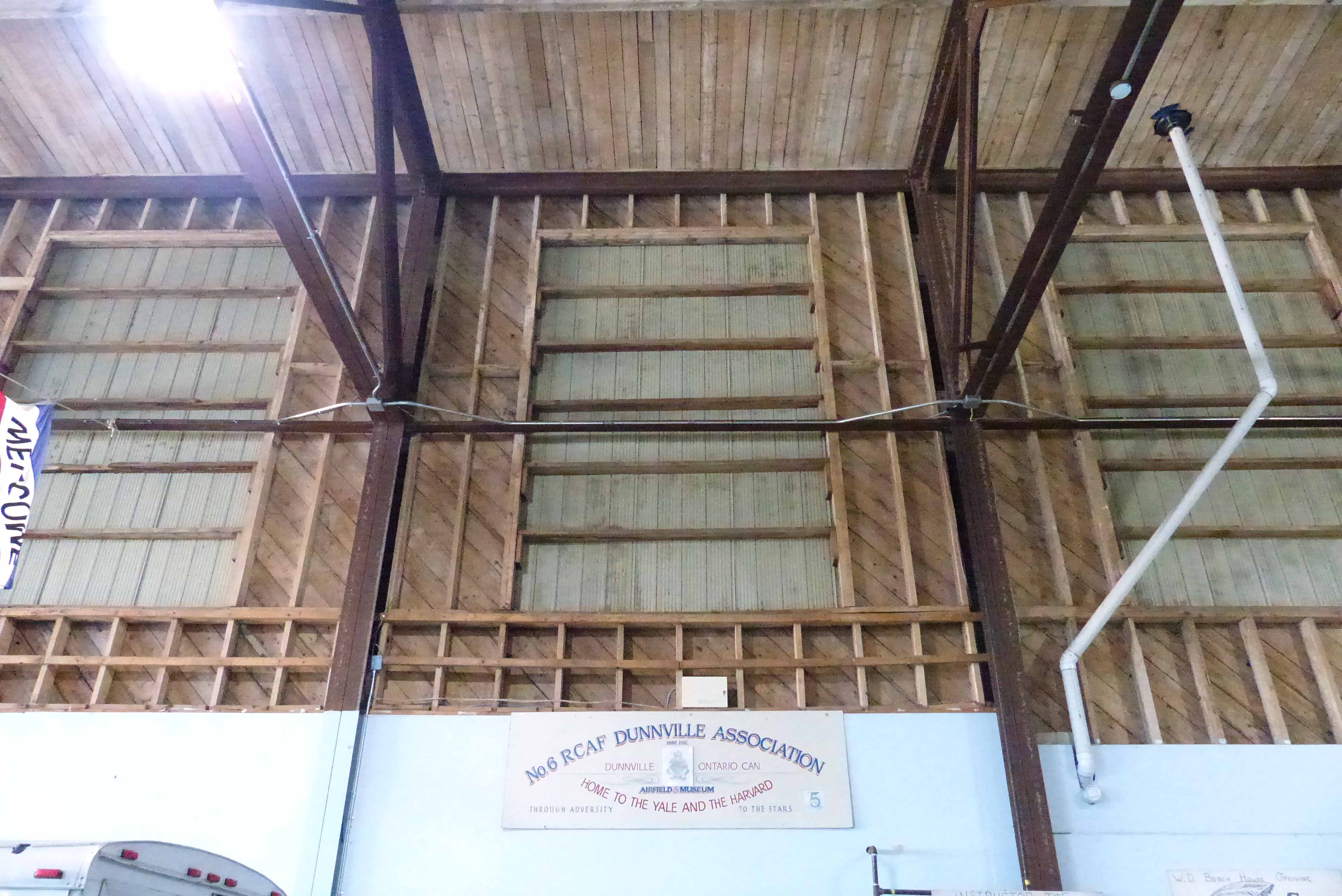
Construction details, Hangar 1

A Service Flying Training School like Dunnville was the intermediate step in a Commonwealth pilot's training program. Trainees had already learned to fly during the fifty hours they spent at an Elementary Flying Training School. At the SFTS they studied advanced techniques like formation flying, low flying, bombing and gunnery, night flying, instrument flying, and radio work, and became familiar with the administration and procedures associated with operating and maintaining military aircraft. At the end of their SFTS course, they were presented with their RCAF "wings", and those selected for operations moved on to an Operational Training Unit for advanced training.

When the school opened in 1940, trainees stayed there for nine weeks, and by 1943 the length of the course increased to sixteen weeks. At the peak of activity in 1943, roughly 1,400 people were stationed at Dunnville, and sixty-four Harvard Mk. IIs, thirty-six Harvard Mk. IIBs, eight Mk. II Ansons were in use, with a further six Harvards in storage.

== Aerodrome information ==
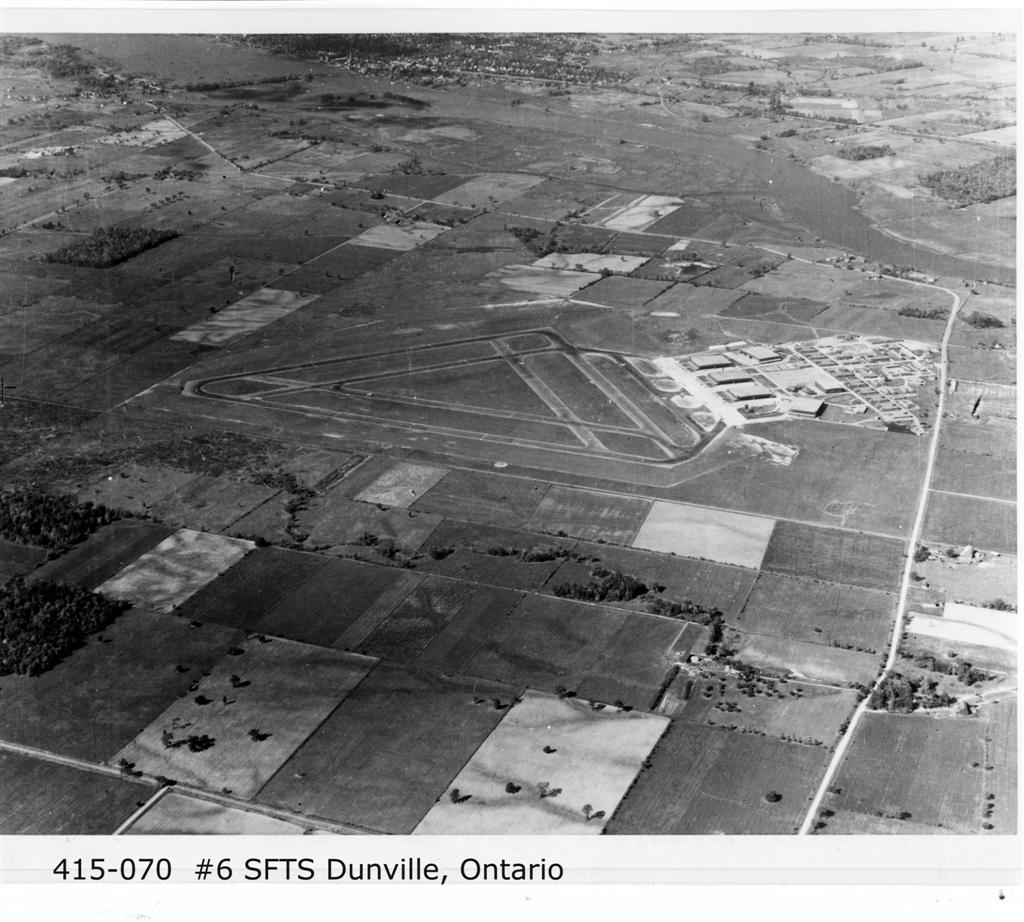
No. 6 SFTS in the 1940s, with Dunnville in the background

In approximately 1942, the aerodrome was listed as RCAF Aerodrome - Dunnville, Ontario at 42°53′N 79°36′W with a variation of 7 degrees west and elevation of 605 ft (184 m). The aerodrome was listed with six runways as follows:

Runway Name	Length	Width	Surface
5/23	2,750 ft (840 m)	100 ft (30 m)	Hard Surfaced
5/23	2,500 ft (760 m)	100 ft (30 m)	Hard Surfaced
10/28	3,500 ft (1,100 m)	100 ft (30 m)	Hard Surfaced
10/28	3,000 ft (910 m)	100 ft (30 m)	Hard Surfaced
15/33	2,600 ft (790 m)	100 ft (30 m)	Hard Surfaced
15/33	2,400 ft (730 m)	100 ft (30 m)	Hard Surfaced

== Honours and awards ==
Flying Officer (F/O) Ross P. McLean, an instructor at No. 6 SFTS, was Commended for Valuable Services in the Air on 26 October 1943.

Five months later, on 12 March 1944, McLean was taxiing his aircraft when he saw a Harvard crash on another runway and catch fire. He taxied over to the burning Harvard and, with the assistance of Leading Aircraftman (LAC) Norman F. Wolgast, pulled the pilot out of the flames just before the burning aircraft was destroyed. McLean was made a Member, Order of the British Empire, and Wolgast, from the Royal Australian Air Force, received the British Empire Medal.

== Distinguished graduates ==
Some of the more noteworthy pilots who trained at this station include:

- Sir David Evans, RAF, Commander, Order of the British Empire, who rose to Air Chief Marshal after the war
- Clarke Walter "Wally" Floody, RCAF, Mention in Despatches, Member, Order of the British Empire, who was the principal engineer of the tunnels used in the Great Escape
- John Alexander "Jack" Spence, RCAF, DFC and Bar, who rescued seven downed airmen with his Supermarine Walrus (Note: the Guelph Civic Museum has Spence's meticulously documented scrapbooks, which include photographs and notes from his time at Dunnville, as well as medals and other items related to his wartime service.)
- William Herbert "Bill" Swetman, RCAF, DSO, DFC, who was the second youngest commanding officer in the RCAF during the Second World War.

== Remembrance ==
Most of the BCATP stations suffered casualties, many in flying accidents, and the toll at Dunnville was particularly high. Forty-seven lives were lost at the station: twenty-five trainees, eighteen instructors, and four others. These men are commemorated by memorials at the public library in Dunnville, the plaque on Port Maitland Road near the airport entrance, and the magnificent memorial in front of the airport's hangars. No. 6 RCAF Dunnville Museum, located in Hangar 1 at the airport, maintains the memorials.

Some of those who died at the station are buried in Dunnville, most at Dunnville (Riverside) Cemetery, and one at St. Michael's Roman Catholic Cemetery

In addition to these men who are formally remembered, Air Cadet Morrison of Hamilton drowned on 18 July 1943, while swimming at an Air Cadet camp held at RCAF Dunnville. Mr. Morrison is not considered an "official" casualty of the Second World War.

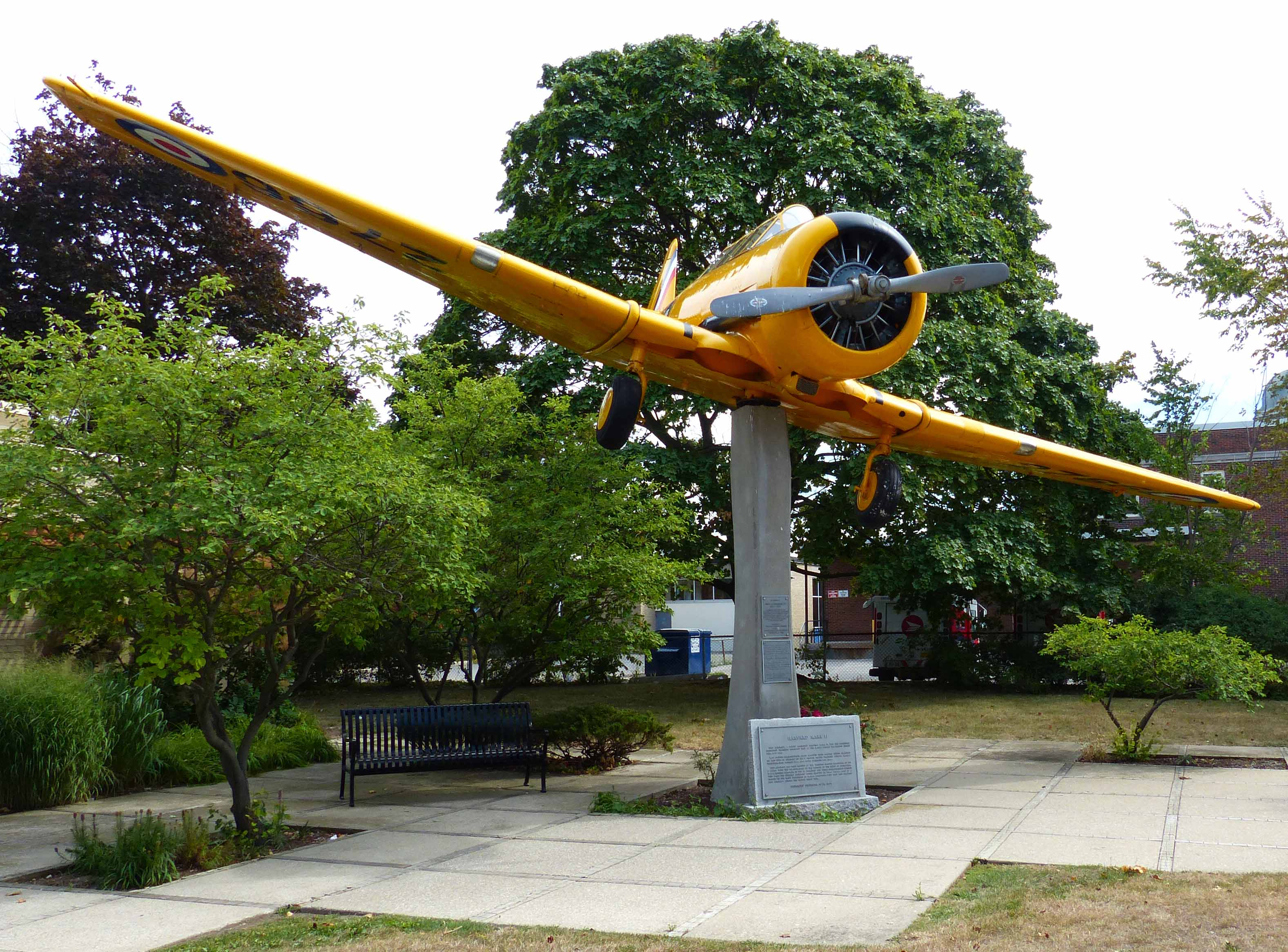
Harvard 2766 at the library

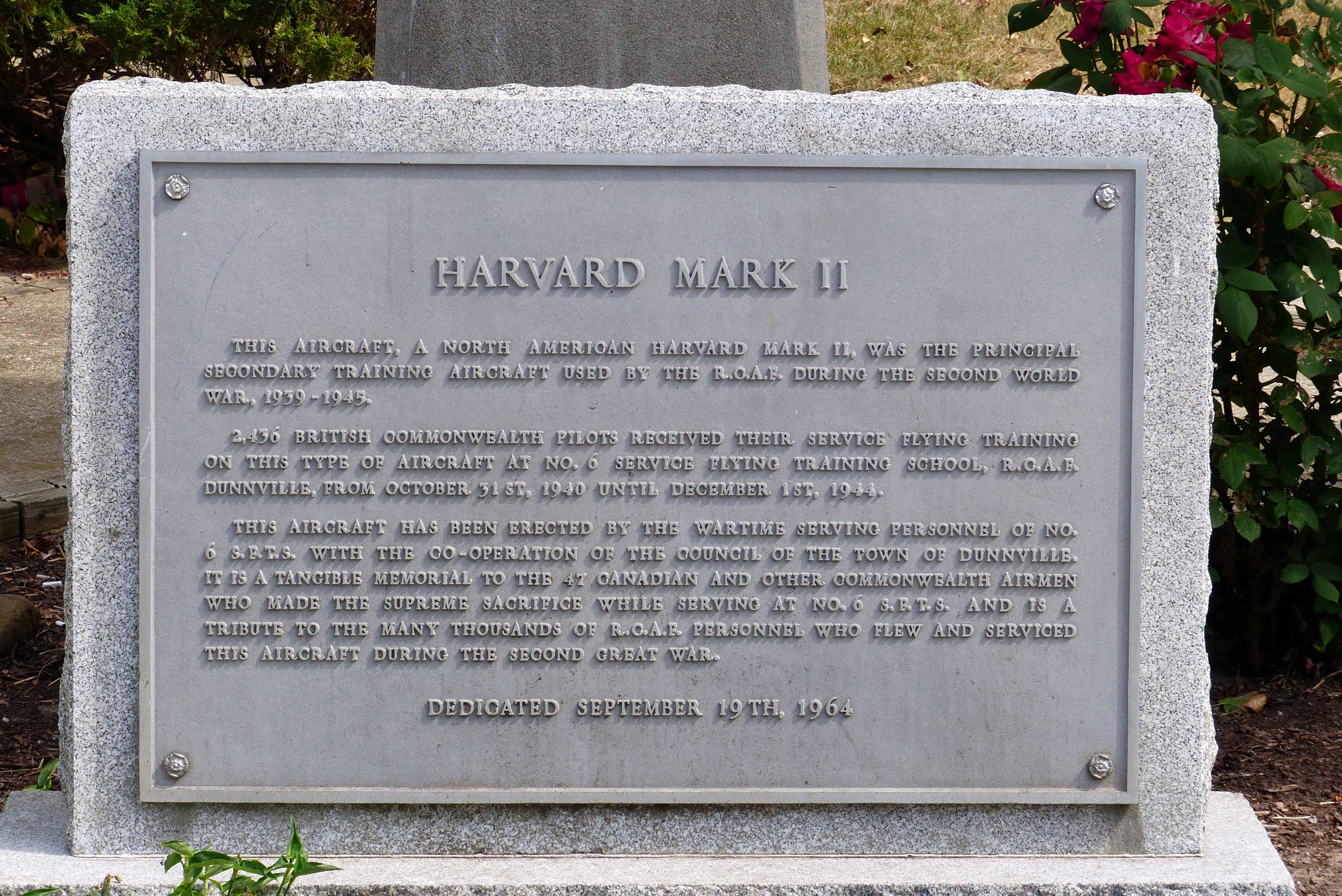
Harvard 2766's plaque

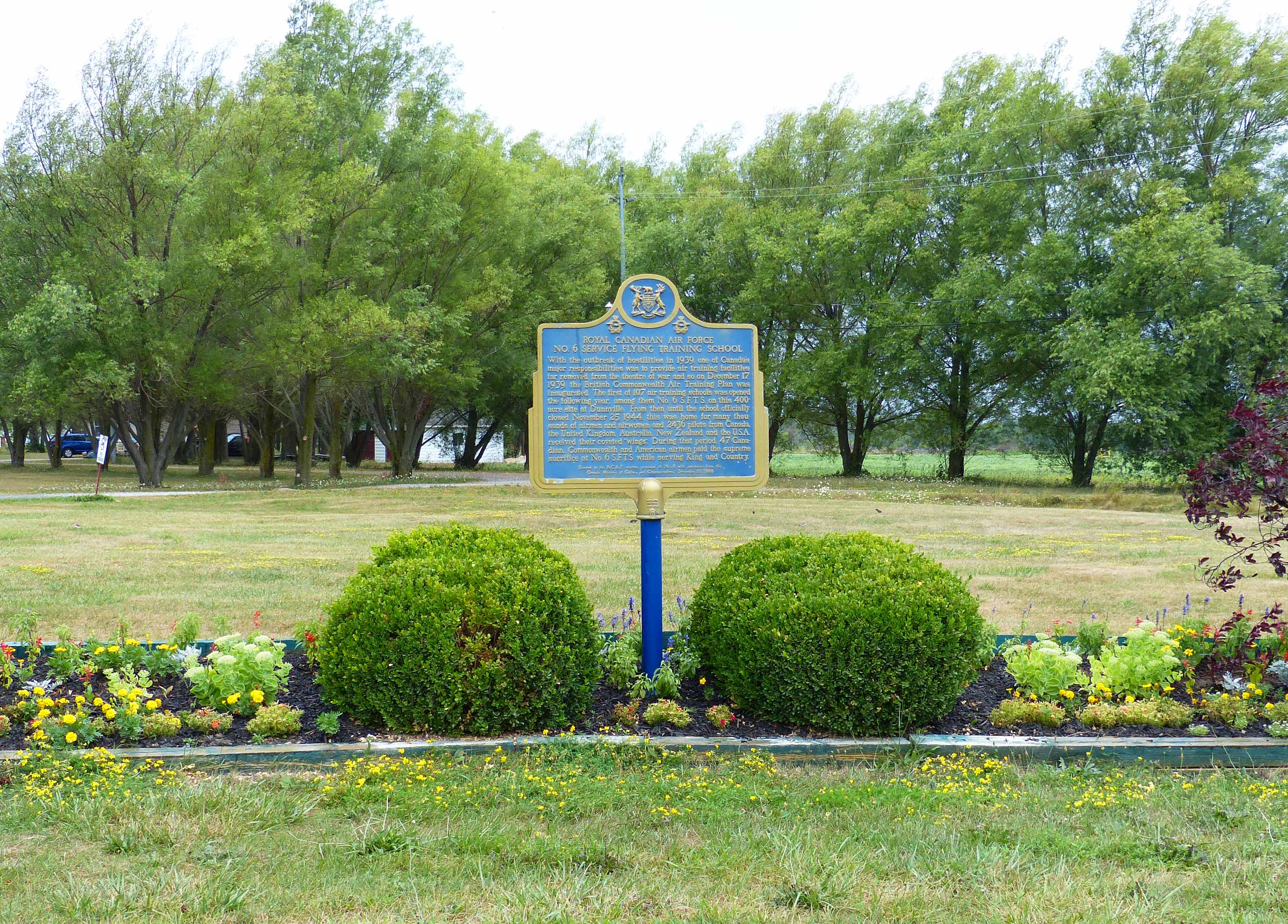
Ontario Heritage Trust plaque on Port Maitland Road

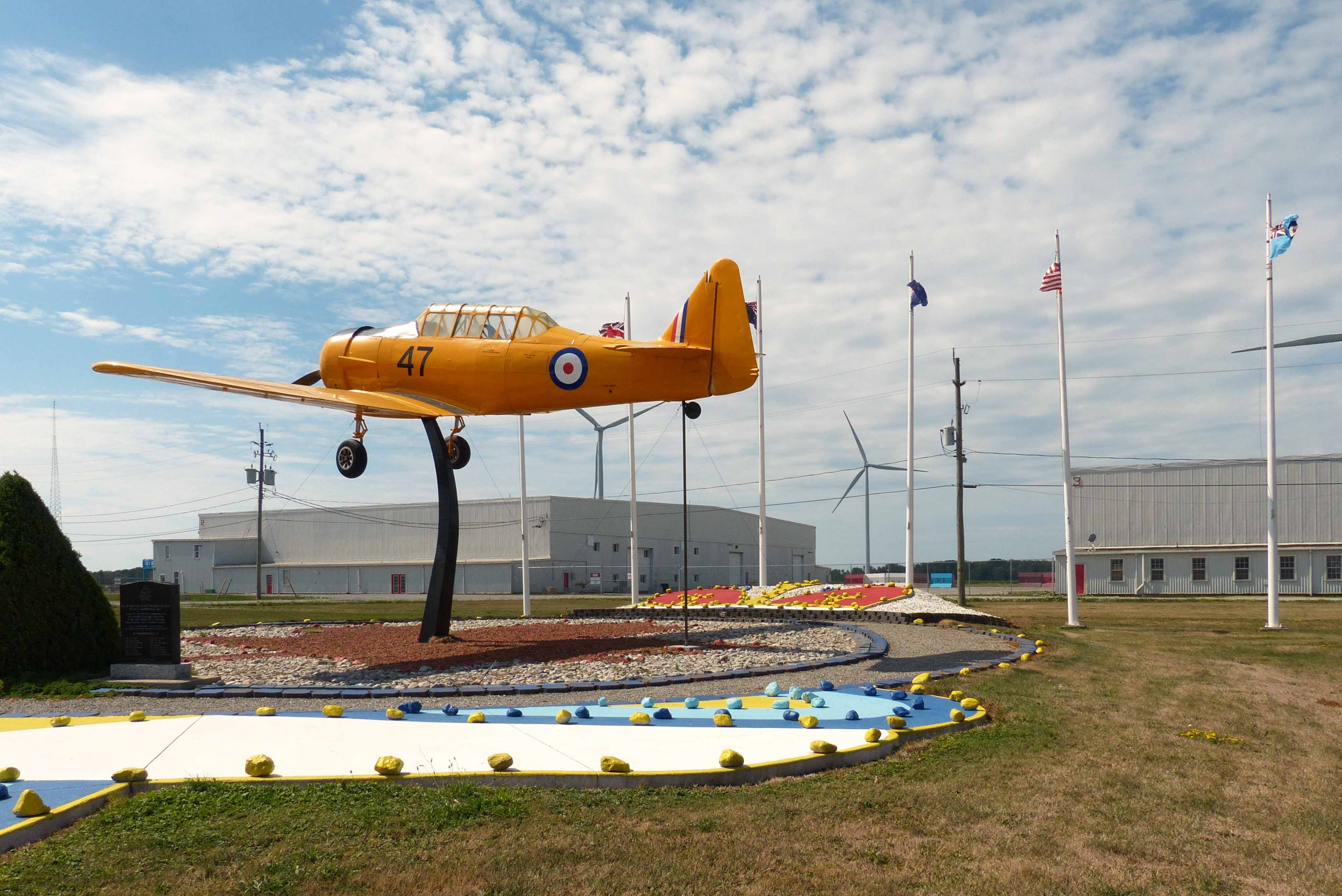
The memorial in front of the hangars

== Postwar ==
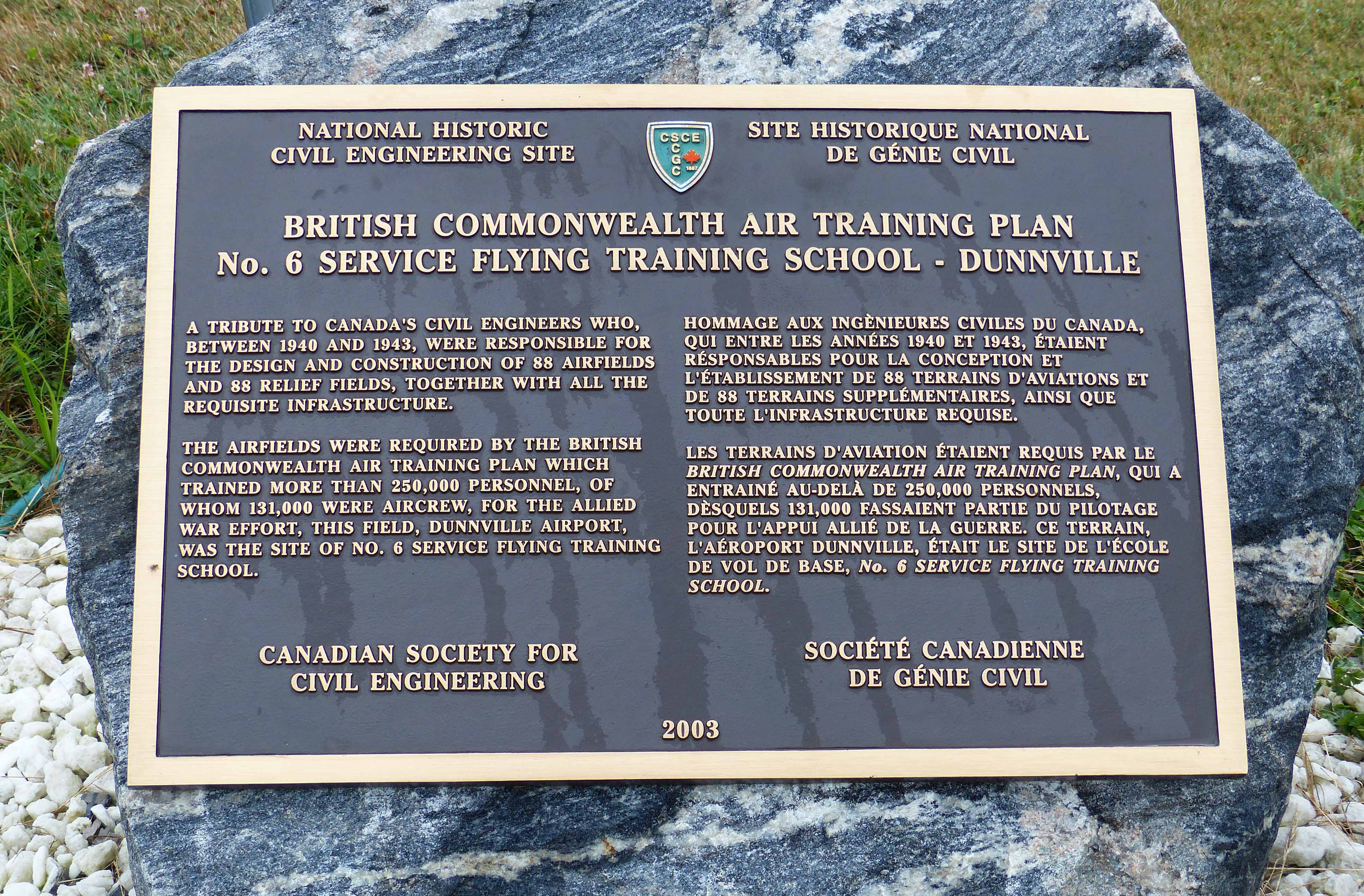
2003 Civil Engineering Award

The Royal Canadian Air Force retained the airfield after No. 6 SFTS closed, and it became a detachment of No. 6 Repair Depot in Trenton. Harvards, Chipmunks, and Lancasters were stored at the field until the RCAF disposed of the property in 1964. One of the last aircraft stored at Dunnville, RCAF Lancaster FM212, was moved to Windsor, Ontario by barge where it is being restored by the Canadian Historical Aircraft Association.

The Cold Springs Turkey Farm took over the property in 1964, and many years later it became the Dunnville Airport.

In 1999, a group of volunteers created the No. 6 Dunnville Association, which opened the No. 6 RCAF Dunnville Museum in 2003. The members of the museum work to preserve artifacts and training aircraft from the British Commonwealth Air Training Plan (BCATP). Located in Hangar 1 of the former Dunnville Airport, the Museum features Harvard, Yale, Cornell, Fleet Finch and more aircraft on static display.

In 2003, the Canadian Society for Civil Engineering designated the Dunnville Airport property as a National Historic Civil Engineering site.

== See also ==
- Canadian Warplane Heritage Museum
