= Dorothy Rungeling =

Canadian pilot

- Born: Helen Maude Doane; May 12, 1911; Hamilton, Ontario, Canada
- Died: February 17, 2018 (aged 106); Fonthill, Ontario, Canada
- Spouse: Charles Rungeling

Dorothy Wetherald Rungeling (May 12, 1911 – February 17, 2018) was a Canadian pilot from Fenwick, Ontario hailed as one of Canada's most experienced air racers. She was the adopted daughter of Ethelwyn Wetherald, the Canadian poet and journalist. In 2004, Dorothy published a collection of her mother's writing, "Life and Works of Ethelwyn Wetherald 1857-1940" (Ridgeville, Ont, 2004, D. Rungeling). Dorothy is also known for own her writing as a published author and Aviation Editor for the Evening Tribune, Welland and won an Aviation Writers Award at the 1953 AITA convention. Before venturing into flying, Dorothy also trained and showed horses and wrote a series of instructions for fellow trainers.

As a pilot, she participated in Canadian and International Aviation competitions including: All Women's International Air Races, the Women's Transcontinental Air Races, and the Canadian Governor-General's Cup Air Race. Once she received her private pilot licence, she joined the Ninety-Nines (worldwide organization of female pilots formed in 1929). She also worked to make Welland an air-marking and it is believed to be the first air-marking in Canada. She worked in politics, and in 1964 she became the first woman to serve on Pelham town council.

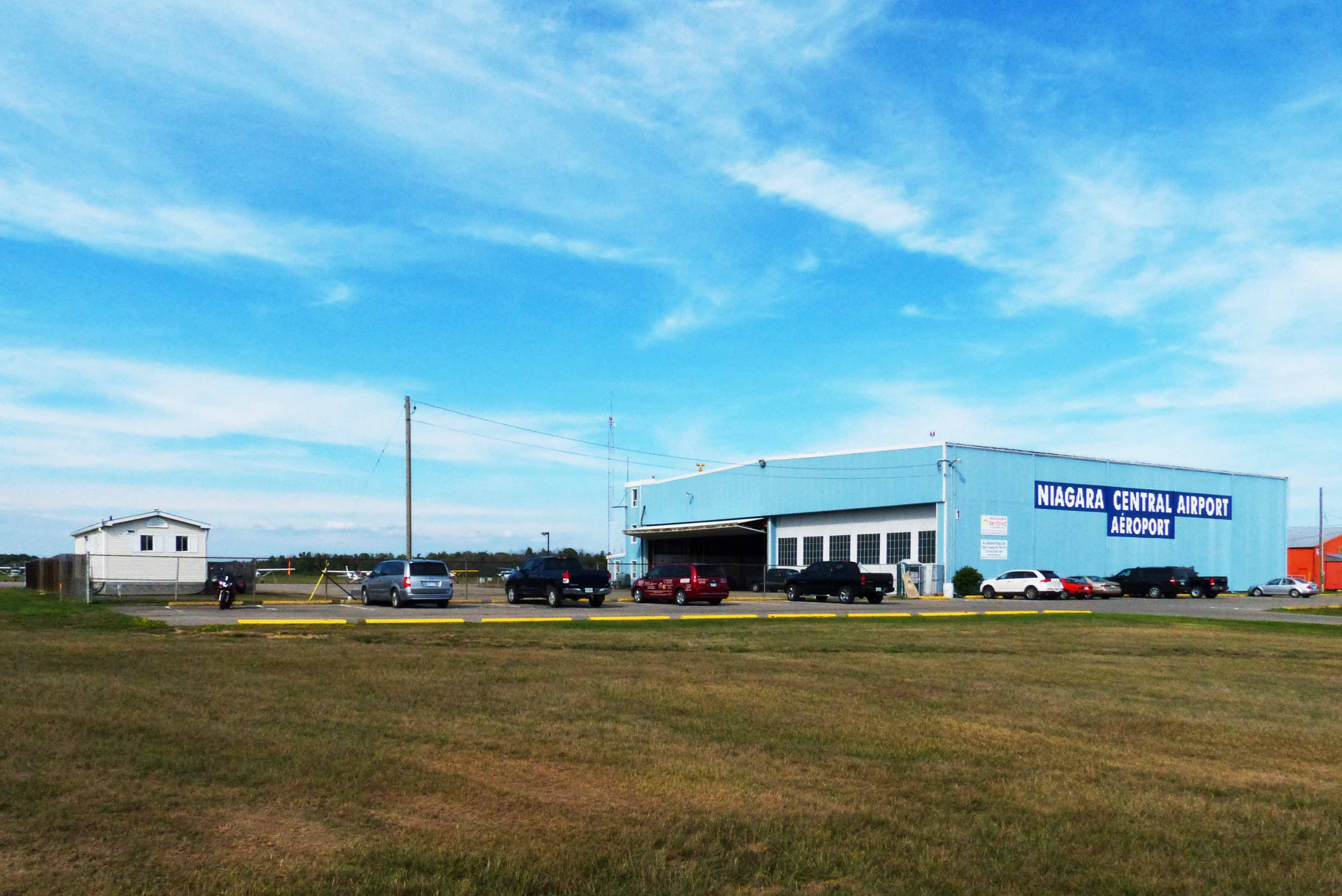
Niagara Central Dorothy Rungeling Airport

In 2003, she received the Order of Canada for her accomplishments as a female pilot, which include receiving her pilot's licence, commercial licence, instructor's certification, and senior commercial pilot's licence. A commemorative stamp was issued in honour of Dorothy Rungeling, the first woman to solo a helicopter, on her 99th birthday. She turned 100 in May 2011. Dorothy continued her writing in a column for The Voice of Pelham entitled Viewpoints. She wrote her last article for the publication in February 2013 at the age of 101. In 2015, when Rungeling was 104, the Niagara Central Airport was renamed Niagara Central Dorothy Rungeling Airport following consent of Bill 20.

Dorothy Rungeling died at a nursing home in Fonthill, Ontario on February 17, 2018, at the age of 106.

== Awards ==
- Order of Canada 2003
- Amelia Earhart Medal
- Governor-General's Cup 1953, 1956
- Aviation writers Award 1953

== Publications ==
- "Navigation emphasized in the Governor-General’s Race" Canadian Aviation, October 1956, p. 53-55.
- "Fixed Wing to Whirly Bird" Canadian Aviation, July 1959, p. 38-39.
- "One Night on an Island" GAM on yachting, January 1971, p6-9.
- "Remembering Tommy" Canadian Flight, September–October 1985, p 6- 13.
- "Fly and Stay Young" Canadian Flight, June–July 1963, p 6–7.
- "The Eggbeater and I" Canadian Flight, Aug-Sept 1963, 8–9.
- The Flying Housewife, 2003, Dorothy Rungeling.
- It's Fun to Grow Old!, 2002, Dorothy Rungeling.
- "VIEWpoints: The history of aviation in Pelham and Welland" The Voice of Pelham, Wednesday May 30, 2012, p. 4.
- Life and works of Ethelwyn Wetherald 1857-1940: with a selection of her poems and articles / by Dorothy W. Rungeling. [Ridgeville, Ont.] : D. Rungeling, c2004.
- The road to home: tales of rural life in the early 1900s / by Dorothy W. Rungeling. [Pelham, Ont.] : Pelham Historical Society, 2001.
