= Dunnville Airport =

Former aerodrome in Dunnville, Ontario

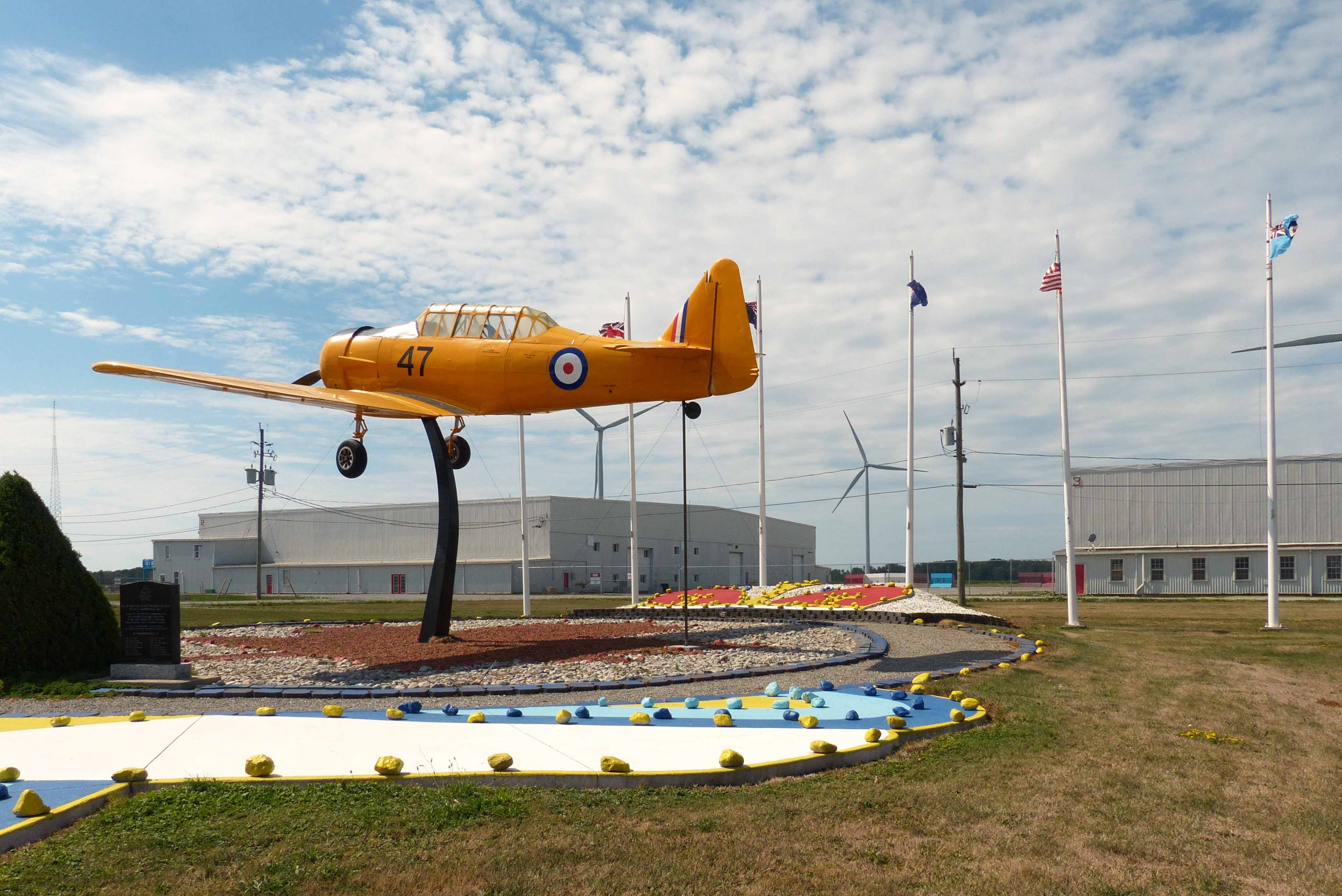
- IATA: none; ICAO: none; TC LID: CDU9>

Summary
- Airport type: Closed
- Owner: 1736032 Ontario Inc.
- Operator: 1736032 Ontario Inc.
- Location: Dunnville, Ontario
- Time zone: EST (UTC−05:00)
  - Summer (DST): EDT (UTC−04:00)
- Elevation AMSL: 600 ft (180 m)
- Coordinates: 42°52′20″N 079°35′45″W

Map
- Location in Ontario CDU9 (Canada)

Runways
Direction	Length		Surface
Direction	ft	m	Surface
05/23	2,400>	732	Asphalt
09/27	3,500	1,067	Asphalt
- Source: Canada Flight Supplement

Dunnville Airport (TC LID: CDU9) was a registered aerodrome located 2 nautical miles (3.7 km; 2.3 mi) south of Dunnville, Ontario, Canada. It was built during World War II as part of the British Commonwealth Air Training Plan and was home to Royal Canadian Air Force No.6 Service Flying Training School, which opened on 25 November 1940 and closed on 1 December 1944. The No. 6 Dunnville Museum is located in Hangar 1 at the airport and commemorates the RCAF pilot training school.

In 2003 the airport was designated a National Historic Civil Engineering Site by the Canadian Society of Civil Engineers. On 30 May 2013, all flight operations ceased at the airport to make way for industrial wind turbines.

The former airport is privately owned, but the public is welcome at the museum. Located within the village of Port Maitland, it sits on over 400 acres (160 ha) of land. There are five aircraft hangars and several buildings dating from the 1940s on the site. There are two public mini-storage buildings, one being large enough to store recreational vehicles and other large vehicles indoors. The popular television show Canada's Worst Driver was filmed on the airport grounds from its sixth season onwards.

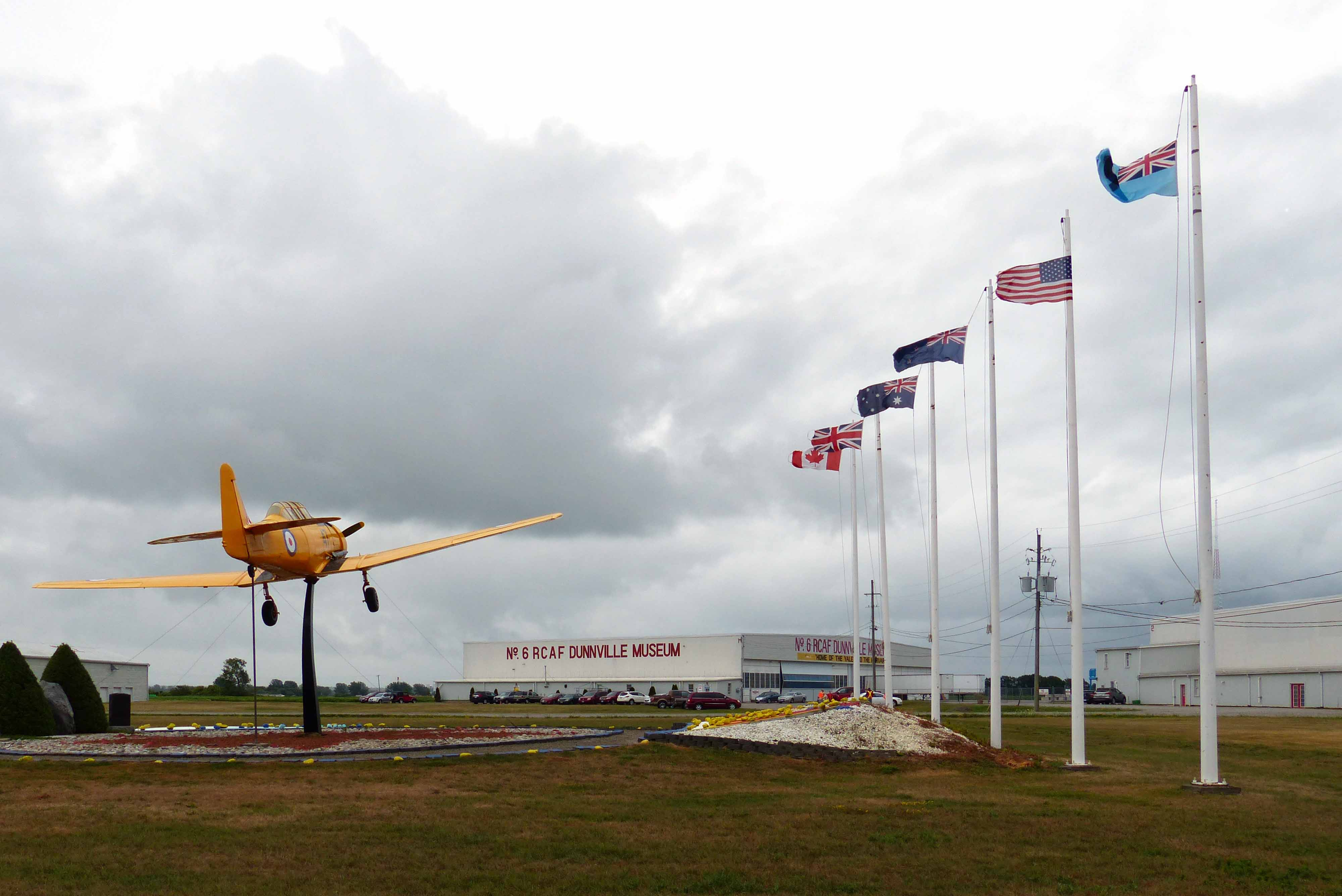
Hangar 1 - the museum

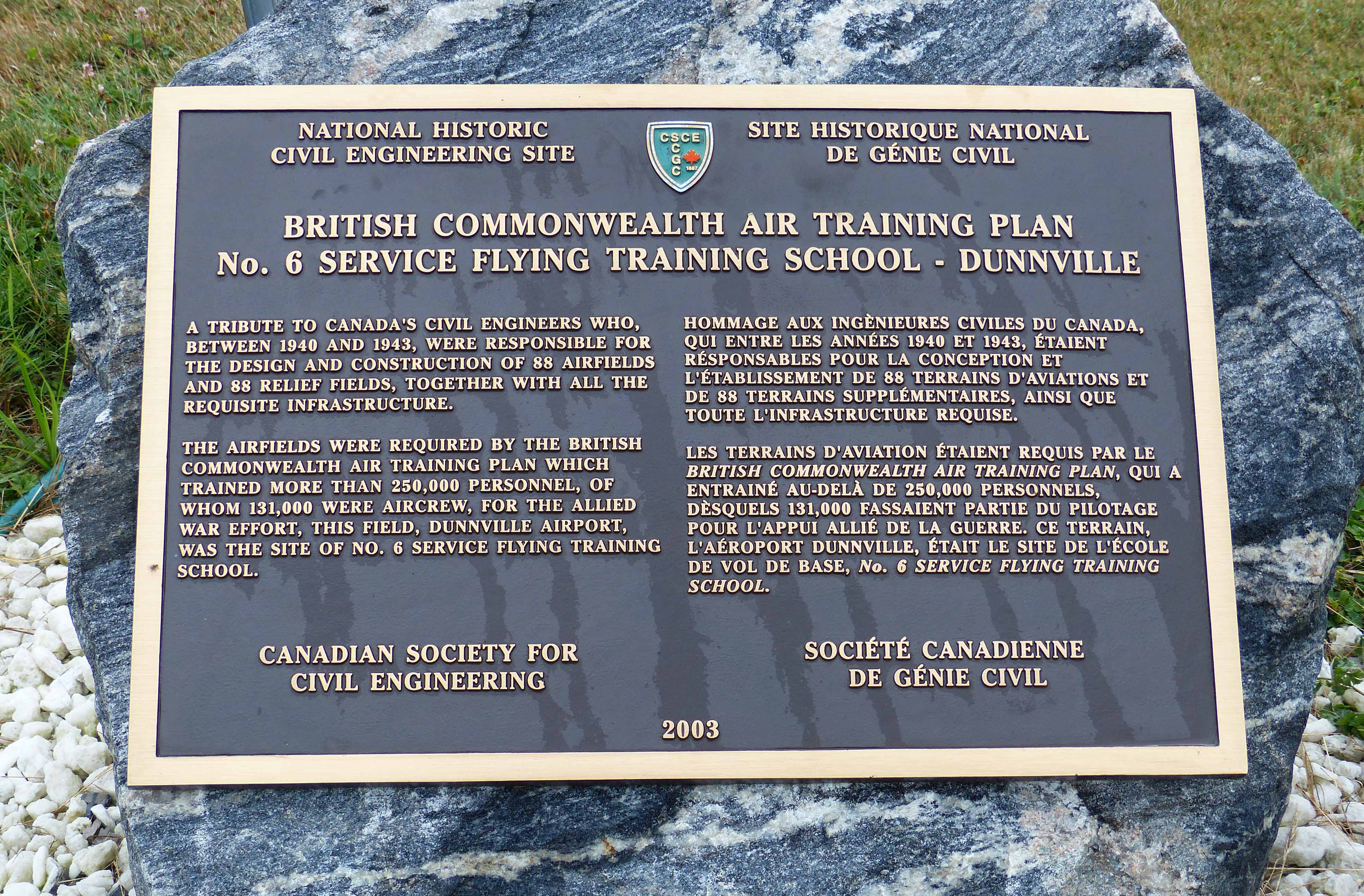
National historic civil engineering site plaque

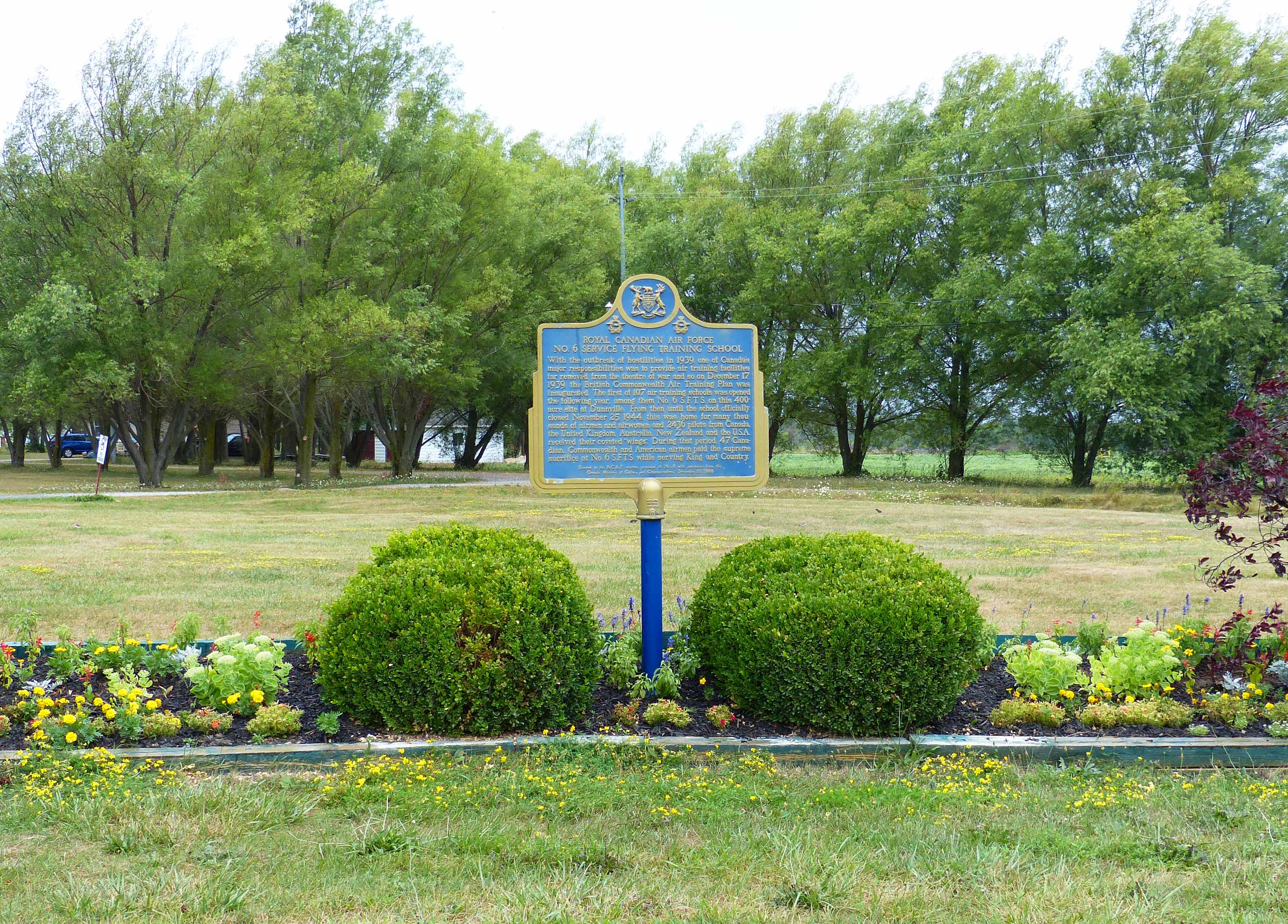
BCATP plaque

== Former tenants ==
- Maylan Aviation
- Niagara Skydiving Centre
