= FlyGTA Airlines =

Canadian air operator

FLYGTA Inc.
IATA	ICAO	Call sign
SX	TOR	HOMERUN
- Commenced operations: November 6, 2016
- AOC #: Canada: 18765; United States: 6LYF537F
- Operating bases: Billy Bishop Toronto City Airport
- Fleet size: 6
- Destinations: 9
- Headquarters: Toronto, Ontario, Canada
- Key people: Chris Nowrouzi (CEO); David Nissan (COO)
- Website: flygta.com

FLYGTA Inc., operating as FLYGTA Airlines, established in 2014, is a Canadian air operator serving southern Ontario and Quebec. FLYGTA is a jet charter company with official bases in Toronto, Niagara, Oshawa, Muskoka, and Montreal, and provides air tourism services in Toronto and Niagara Falls, air charter, cargo, and scheduled flights.

As of November 6, 2017, the airline served over eight destinations with scheduled flights from Billy Bishop Toronto City Airport to/from destinations such as Barrie/Simcoe, St. Catharines/Niagara, Kitchener/Waterloo, Wiarton/Bruce Peninsula and Muskoka. The flight between Toronto-Billy Bishop and St. Catharines/Niagara is the shortest link between the two cities (land transportation methods must travel many kilometres around Lake Ontario) and is advertised as the shortest commercial flight in North America at 10 minutes according to the company and 15 minutes according to Global News.

The airline offers charters internationally mainly from Southern Ontario.

== Scheduled destinations ==
Before 2020, FlyGTA operated at following airports:

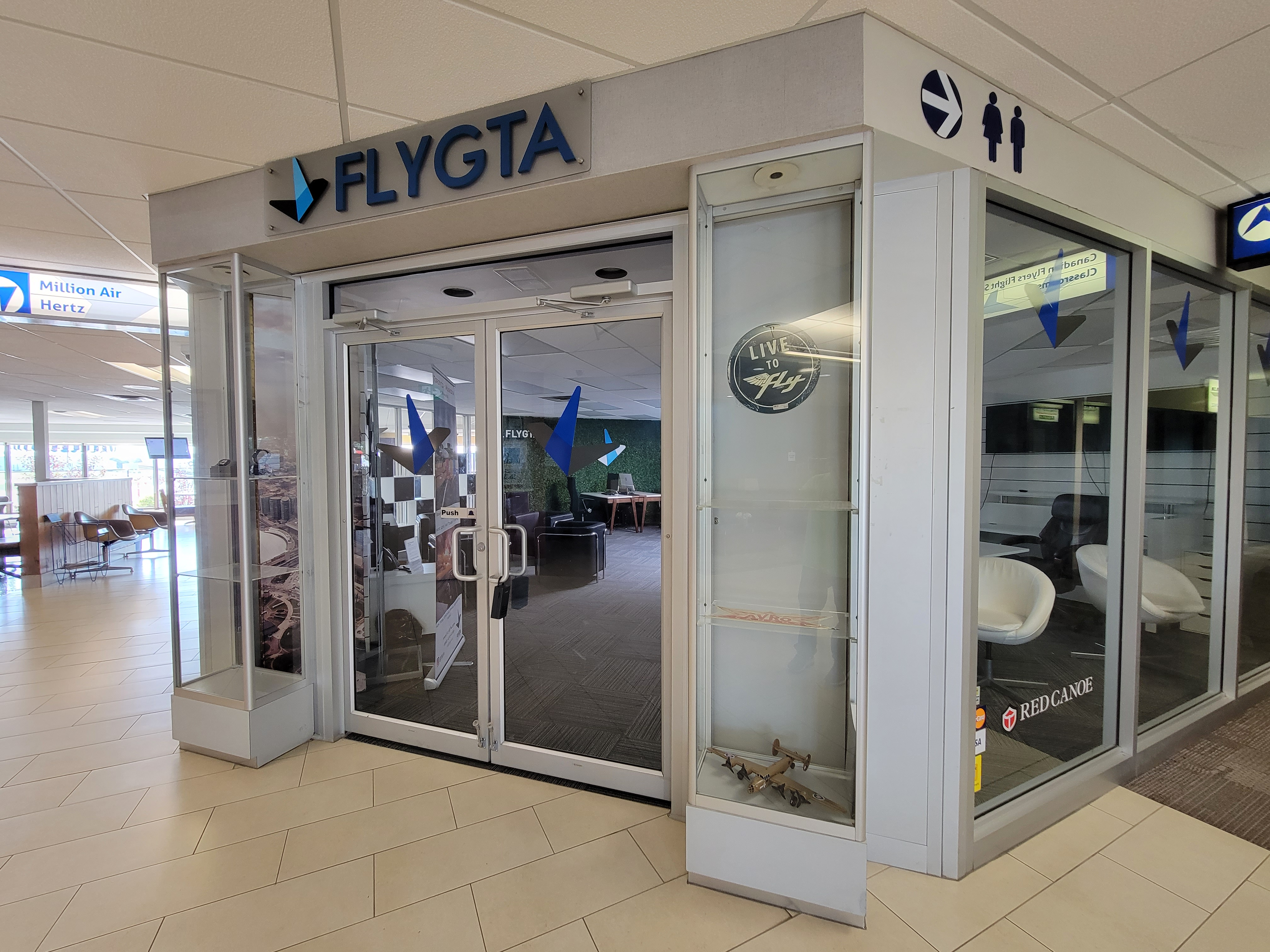
FlyGTA office at the former Toronto/Buttonville Airport

- Barrie (Lake Simcoe Regional Airport) service offered in 2017
- Bracebridge (Muskoka Airport) service offered in 2019
- Kitchener/Waterloo (Region of Waterloo International Airport) service offered in 2017
- St. Catharines/Niagara Falls (St. Catharines/Niagara District Airport) service offered in 2016
- Toronto (Billy Bishop Toronto City Airport) (Hub)
- Wiarton/Bruce Peninsula (Wiarton Airport) service offered in 2019

== Fleet ==
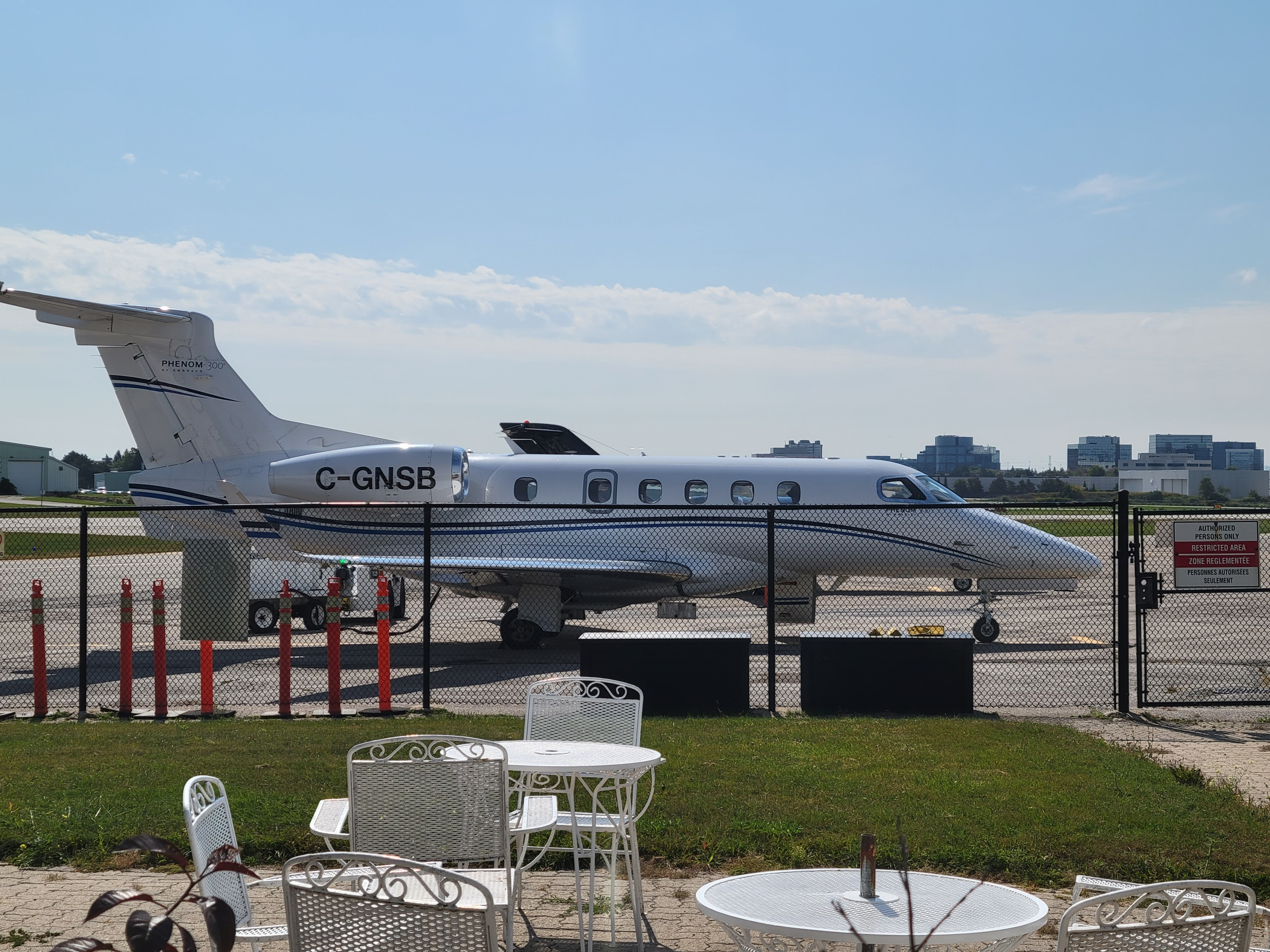
FlyGTA Airlines' Embraer Phenom 300 parked at Toronto/Buttonville Airport

As of August 2019, FlyGTA Airlines had the following light aircraft registered with Transport Canada:

FlyGTA fleet
Aircraft	No. of aircraft	Variants	Notes
Bombardier Challenger	1	CL600	Registered 2023-12-30, not on FLYGTA site
Cessna 207	1	Cessna 207A	A seven seat 207A, not on FLYGTA site
Cessna Citation II	1	Citation Bravo	A stretched version of the Cessna Citation I, seats up to seven
Beechcraft King Air B100	1	BE10	Can seat eight
Piper PA-31 Navajo	1	PA-31-350 Chieftain	Stretched version of the Navajo, up to eight passengers
Embraer Phenom 300	1	EMB505	FlyGTA site

The Transport Canada list also includes a Piper PA-34-200T Seneca II and a Piper PA-28 Cherokee both with cancelled certificates. However, the Piper PA-28 Cherokee is listed at the FLYGTA site as a PA-28-161 Warrior II and still in operation.
