= Niagara Central Dorothy Rungeling Airport =

Niagara Central Dorothy Rungeling Airport Welland/Niagara Central Dorothy Rungeling Aerodrome
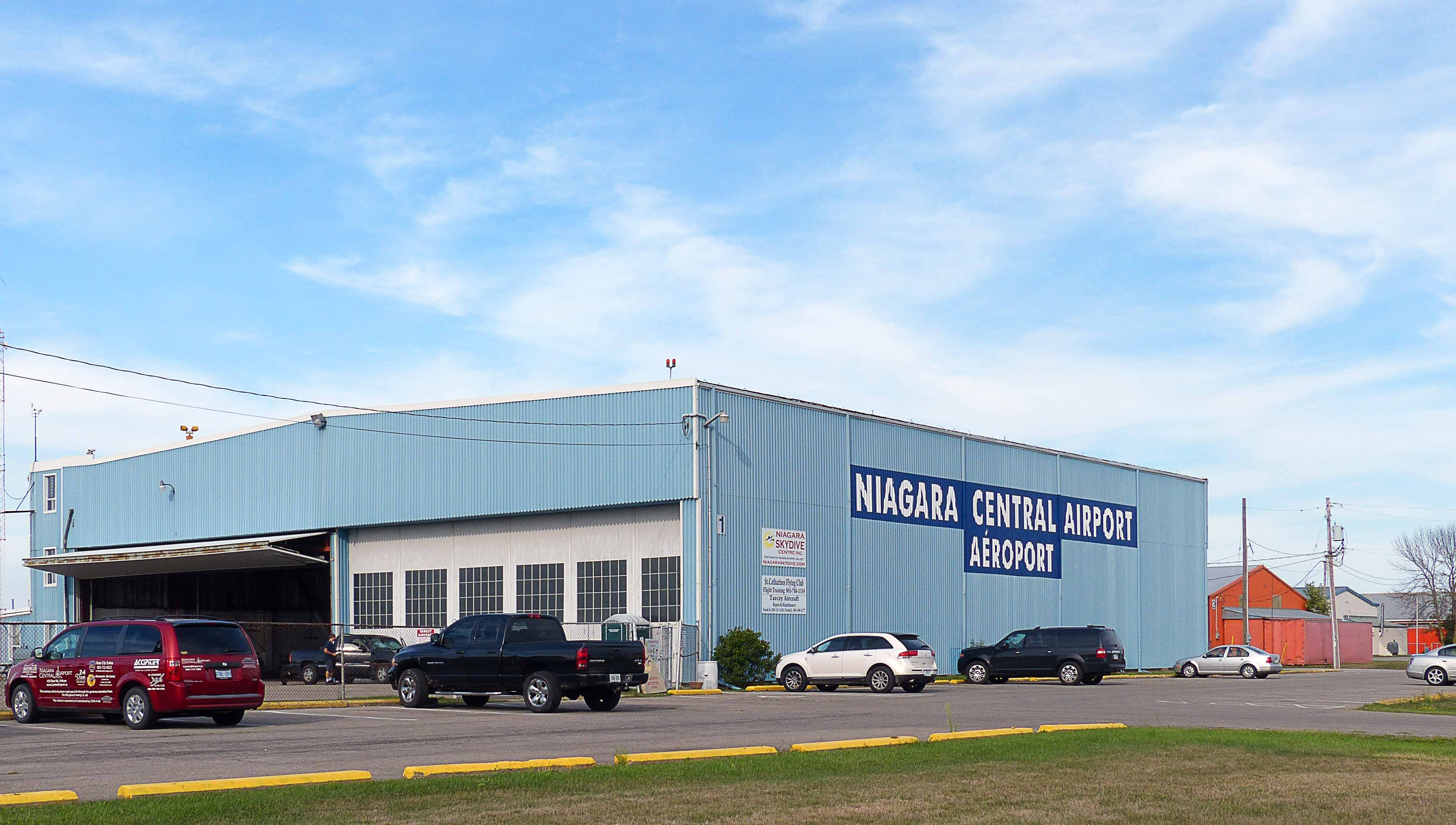
- Hangar line
- IATA: none; ICAO: none; TC LID: CNQ3

Summary
- Airport type: Public
- Operator: Niagara Central Airport Commission
- Location: Pelham, Ontario
- Time zone: EST (UTC−05:00)
  - Summer (DST): EDT (UTC−04:00)
- Elevation AMSL: 585 ft / 178 m
- Coordinates: 42°58′48″N 079°19′29″W
- Website: www.centralairport.ca

Map
- Location in Ontario CNQ3 (Canada)

Runways
| Direction | Length | | Surface |
| Direction | ft | m | Surface |
|---|---|---|---|
| 05/23 | 3,493 | 1,065 | Asphalt |
| 16/34 | 2,663 | 812 | Asphalt |
| 11/29 | 2,341 | 714 | Grass |

Statistics (2010)
- Aircraft movements: 23,341
- Source: Canada Flight Supplement; Movements from Statistics Canada

Niagara Central Dorothy Rungeling Airport or Welland/Niagara Central Dorothy Rungeling Aerodrome, (TC LID: CNQ3), is a registered aerodrome located in Pelham, 3.5 nautical miles (6.5 km; 4.0 mi) west of Welland, Ontario, Canada. Niagara Central accommodates aerial photographers, itinerant light aircraft and an automatic weather station. It was built in 1940 by the Royal Canadian Air Force as part of the British Commonwealth Air Training Plan and served as the relief airfield for the No. 6 Service Flying Training School in nearby Dunnville.

The airport is the home of the 87th Eagle Squadron of the Royal Canadian Air Cadets who have training and administration space in the airport's former meeting place of Welland Fire Company Number 1. The Southern Ontario Gliding Centre (SOGC) of the Royal Canadian Air Cadets also use the airport for spring and fall familiarization flights for the cadets.

In 1995, various members of Fonthill Branch 613 of the Royal Canadian Legion lobbied to have the airport renamed "Bud Ker Welland Airport" in recognition of a local World War II Spitfire fighter pilot, but were unsuccessful. In 2015 the airport was renamed Niagara Central Dorothy Rungeling Airport, in honour of the legendary Canadian pilot Dorothy Rungeling, CM.

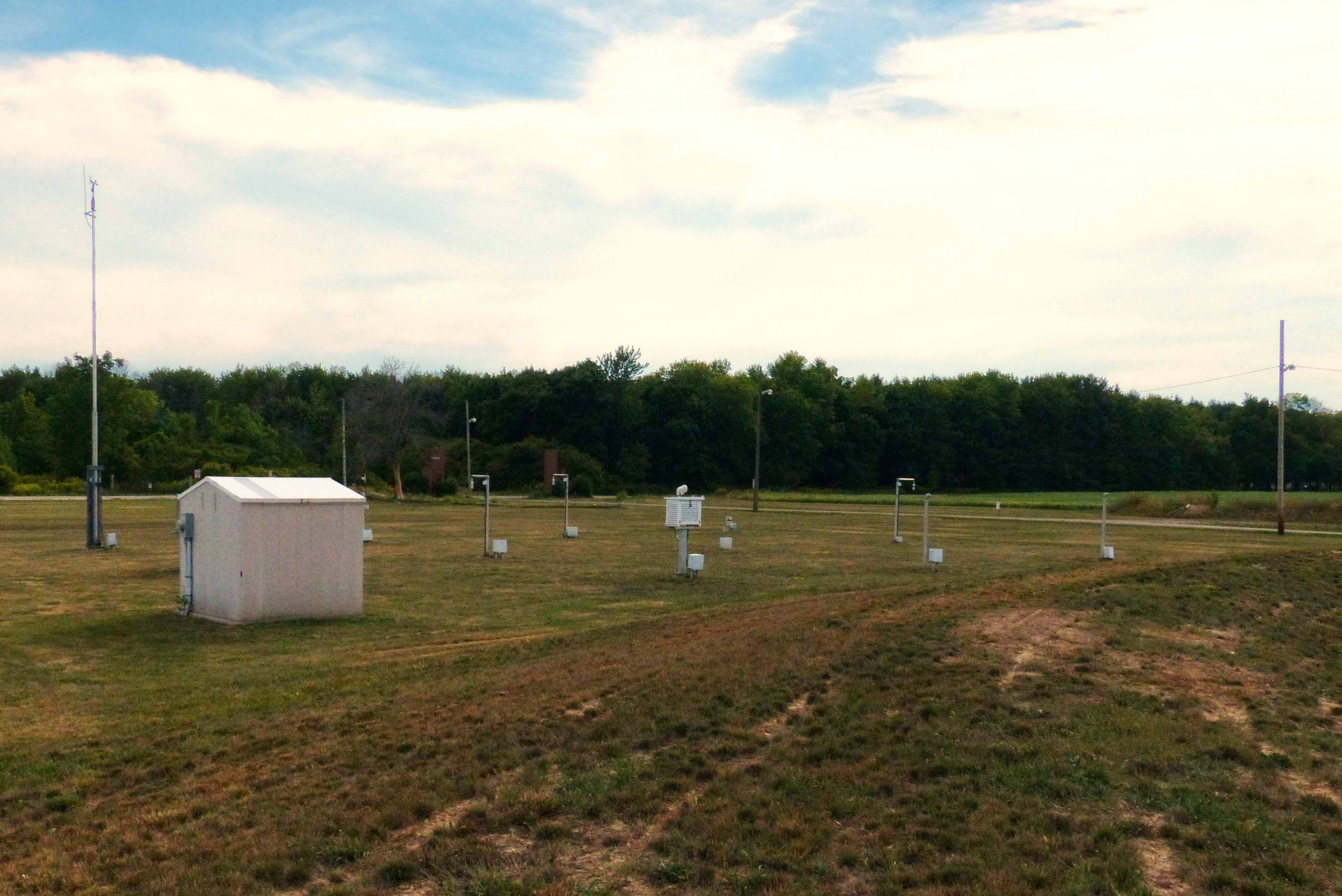
Environment Canada automated weather station

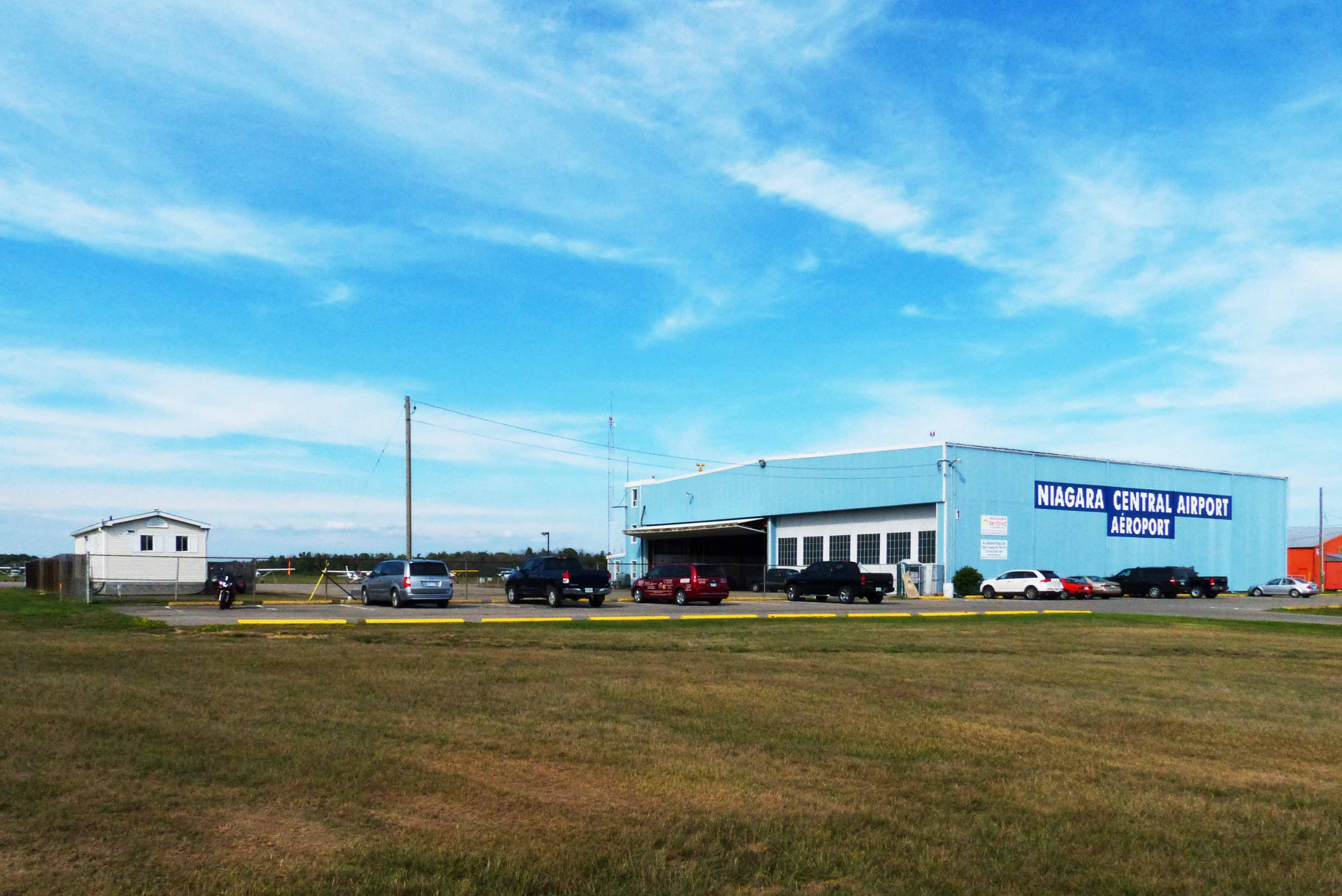
Public areas

== See also ==
- St. Catharines/Niagara District Airport
- Niagara Falls/Niagara South Airport
