= Dunnville =

- Unincorporated community
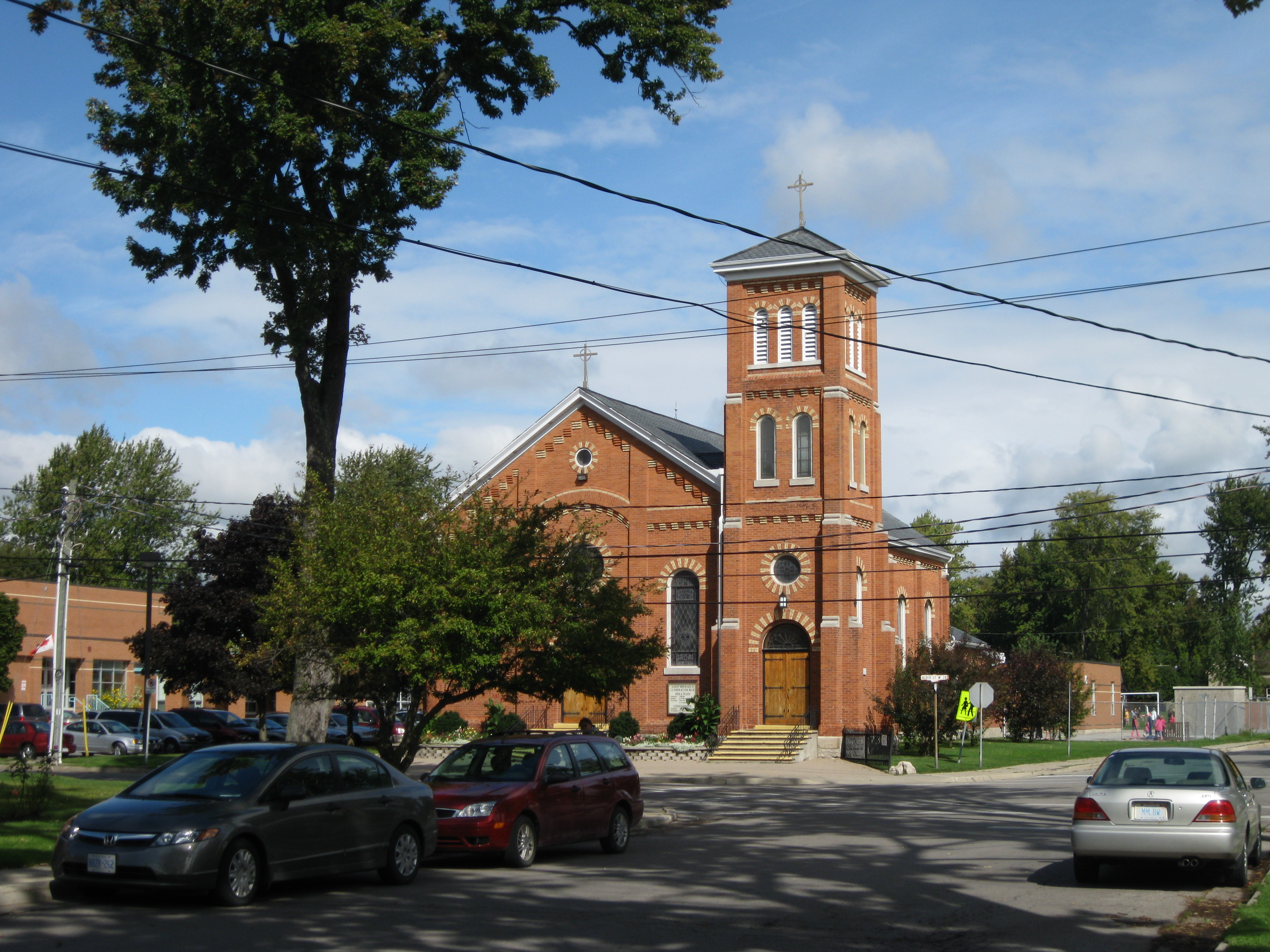
- St. Michael's Catholic Church
- Motto: Grand Living in a Great Town
- Location within Ontario Location within Canada
- Coordinates: 42°54′10″N 79°37′00″W
- Country: Canada
- Province: Ontario
- County: Haldimand
- Incorporated as Village of Dunnville: January 1, 1860
- Incorporated as Town of Dunnville: 1900
- Joined Haldimand County: January 1, 2001

Government
  - Mayor of Haldimand: Shelley Ann Bentley
  - Governing body: The Council of the Corporation of Haldimand County
  - Ward 6 (Dunnville) Councillor: Patrick O'Neill
  - MP: Leslyn Lewis (Conservative)
  - MPP: Bobbi Ann Brady (Independent)

Area
  - Total: 5.39 km^{2} (2.08 sq mi)
- Elevation: 183 m (600 ft)

Population (2021)
  - Total: 5,907
  - Density: 1,086.8/km^{2} (2,815/sq mi)
- Demonym: Dunnvilian
- Time zone: UTC−05:00 (EST))
  - Summer (DST): UTC−04:00 (EDT)
- Forward sortation area: N1A
- Area codes: 905, 289, 365

Dunnville is an unincorporated community located near the mouth of the Grand River in Haldimand County, Ontario, Canada, near the historic Talbot Trail. It was formerly an incorporated town encompassing the surrounding area with a total population of 12,000.

== History ==
The European settlement was originally built as the entrance to the Welland "feeder" canal, and the town once boasted several water-powered mills and a once-bustling canal port. The feeder canal closed in the late 1880s, and the last mill was destroyed and replaced with a condominium complex. There is an impassable dam at Dunnville which regulates the level of the Grand River at Port Maitland, which, in the 19th century, also helped regulate the level of the Welland Canal (from 1829 to 1887 when the third canal began to intake its water directly from Lake Erie). Dunnville was incorporated as a village in 1860 and then as a town in 1900. In 1974, the town amalgamated with the Dunn, Canborough, Moulton and Sherbrooke townships into an enlarged Dunville. In 2001, Dunnville was amalgamated with Haldimand and half of Nanticoke to form Haldimand. What was the incorporated town of Dunnville now consists of Wards 5 and 6 in Haldimand County.

Census	Population
1871	1,452
1881	1,808
1891	1,776
1901	2,105
1911	2,861
1921	3,224
1931	3,405
1941	4,028
1951	4,478
1961	5,181
1971	5,576
1981	11,353
1991	12,131
2001	5,686
2006	5,729
2011	5,626
2016	5,759
2021	5,907

It is located only a few kilometres from Lake Erie, so Dunnville has many private vacation properties.

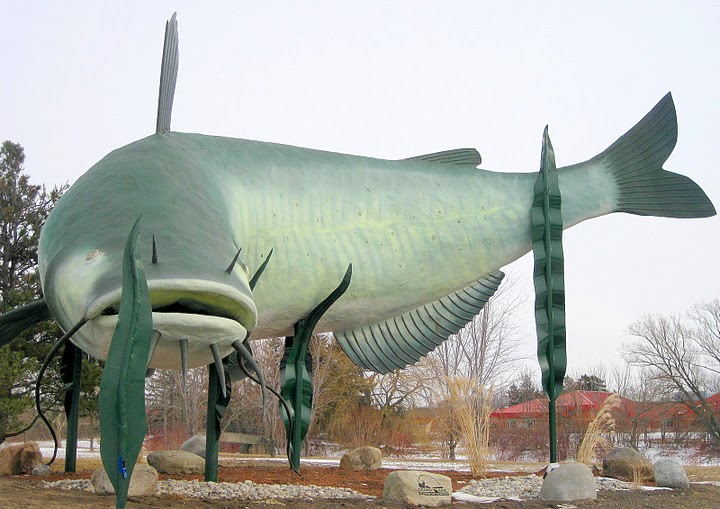
"Muddy" the Mud Cat of Dunnville

Dunnville has many events and natural attractions. In June, the annual Mudcat Festival is held to celebrate one of the Grand River's most well-known inhabitants. The festival includes a parade, strongman contests, midway and fireworks. Another popular event was the Dunnville Agricultural Fair, currently not in operation(the Dunnville Agricultural Society officially dissolved in March 2026 after operating for two decades), held in late August, which included heavy, light, miniature horse shows, and sheep and goat shows. Dunnville has tennis, golf and swimming facilities and many Bed and Breakfasts and campsites. Tuesday and Saturday are Farmers Market days since the relocation of the local arena. Dunnville is currently constructing a new Farmers Market Pavilion, providing more protection from the elements while helping to support what the local farming has to offer (heating may still be an issue).

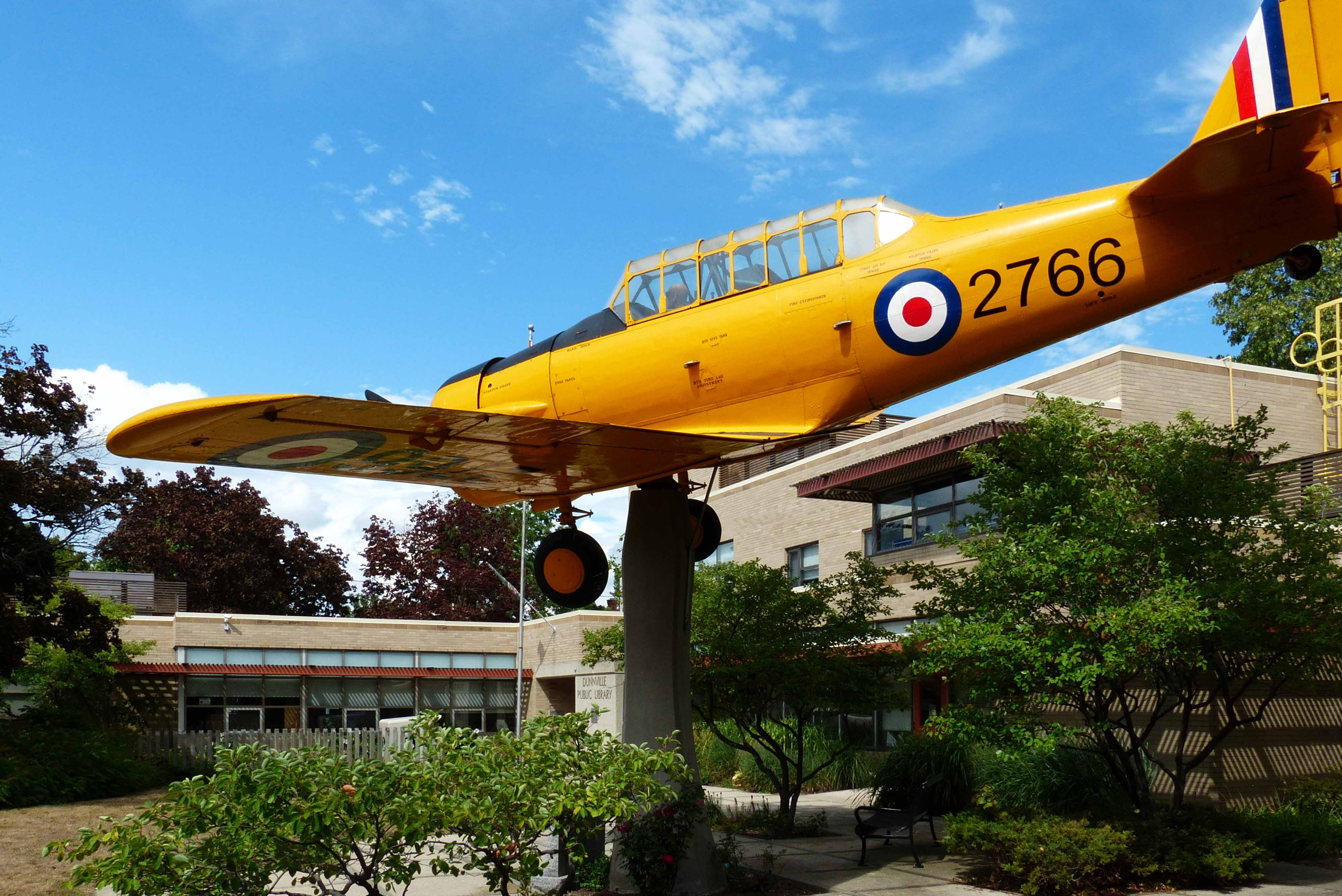
RCAF Memorial, Dunnville Public Library

During World War II the RCAF build the No. 6 SFTS Training Base for advanced pilot training as part of the British Commonwealth Air Training Plan. After No. 6 SFTS closed in 1944 the RCAF retained the airfield as a repair depot until the property was sold in 1964. The Cold Springs Turkey Farm took over the property and many years later it became the Dunnville Airport. Previously used for recreational flying and skydiving, the airport is now closed due to six large wind-turbine power generators on the airfield. The airport is also home to Haldimand County's newest museum, the No. 6 RCAF Dunnville Museum. It has also been the home of the Driver Rehabilitation Centre for the reality television program Canada's Worst Driver since 2010. The Grand River and nearby Lake Erie offers aquatic activities including swimming, sailing, windsurfing, canoeing and features prime locations for fishing. Nearby are Byng Island Conservation Area, Rock Point Provincial Park and Port Maitland's new pier. In the fall, Rock Point hosts thousands of monarch butterflies heading south. Dunnville is also the site of one of Ontario's largest expanses of provincially significant wetlands where bird watching and nature photography are popular activities. Smuckers Foods of Canada Co., which operates the Bick's Pickle Plant (Dunnville's largest factory), employs a small percentage of the town's population, mainly students. In 2001, Bick's head office facility in Scarborough, Ontario was shut down, and operations were transferred to the Dunnville location, where it remained until the end of November 2011, at which point it closed. This community is the easternmost city that belongs to the Green Energy Hub of Southern Ontario.

=== 2009 Grand River flood ===
On February 13, 2009, the Grand River flooded when the river ice thawed, damaging Cayuga and Dunnville. The next day, the CCGC Griffon proceeded up the river to help clear ice.

== Demographics ==
Canada census – Dunnville community profile

	2021	2016
Population	5,907 (+2.6% from 2016)	5,759 (+2.4% from 2011)
Land area	5.44 km^{2} (2.10 sq mi)	5.39 km^{2} (2.08 sq mi)
Population density	1,086.8/km^{2} (2,815/sq mi)	1,068.4/km^{2} (2,767/sq mi)
Median age	50 (M: 47.6, F: 52.0)	48.2 (M: 46.3, F: 49.8)
Private dwellings	2,585 (total)	2,535 (total)
Median household income	$62,400	$50,048

References: 2021 2016

=== Ethnicity ===
Only those populations that comprise more than 1% of the population have been included.

Ethnic Groups in the Community of Caledonia, Ontario (2021)
Ethnic Group	2021		2016	
Ethnic Group	Pop.	%	Pop.	%
Canadian	1,095	18.54%	2,105	36.55%
English	1,750	29.63%	2,070	35.94%
Irish	1,170	19.81%	1,080	18.75%
Scottish	1,250	21.16%	1,260	21.88%
French (Note: Statistic includes all individuals that identified as having a French origin but not otherwise specified.)	470	7.96%	550	9.55%
German	875	14.81%	995	17.28%
Italian	170	2.88%	110	1.91%
Ukrainian	200	3.39%	220	3.82%
Dutch	875	14.81%	810	14.06%
Polish	165	2.79%	155	2.69%
Métis	60	1.02%	30	0.52%
Welsh	100	1.69%	90	1.56%
Portuguese	60	1.02%	40	0.69%
American	65	1.1%	40	0.69%
Hungarian	115	1.95%	145	2.52%
North American Indigenous (Note: Statistic includes all individuals that identified as having an Indigenous origin but not otherwise specified.)	70	1.19%	250	4.34%
Total responses	5,710	96.66%	5,610	97.41%
Total population	5,907	100%	5,759	100%
Note: Totals greater than 100% due to multiple origin responses.

=== Language ===
As of the 2021 census, 5,585 citizens spoke English only, 140 that spoke both official languages and five that spoke neither.

=== Religion ===
As of the 2021 census, 3,255 citizens were identifying as Christian and 2,395 as non-religious and secular perspectives.

== Education ==
Public education is administered by the Grand Erie District School Board. Schools located in Dunville include:

- Dunnville Secondary School
- Mapleview Elementary School
- Thompson Creek Elementary School

Catholic Education is administered by the Brant Haldimand Norfolk Catholic District School Board. Catholic schools located in Dunnville include:

- St. Michael's School

== Sports ==
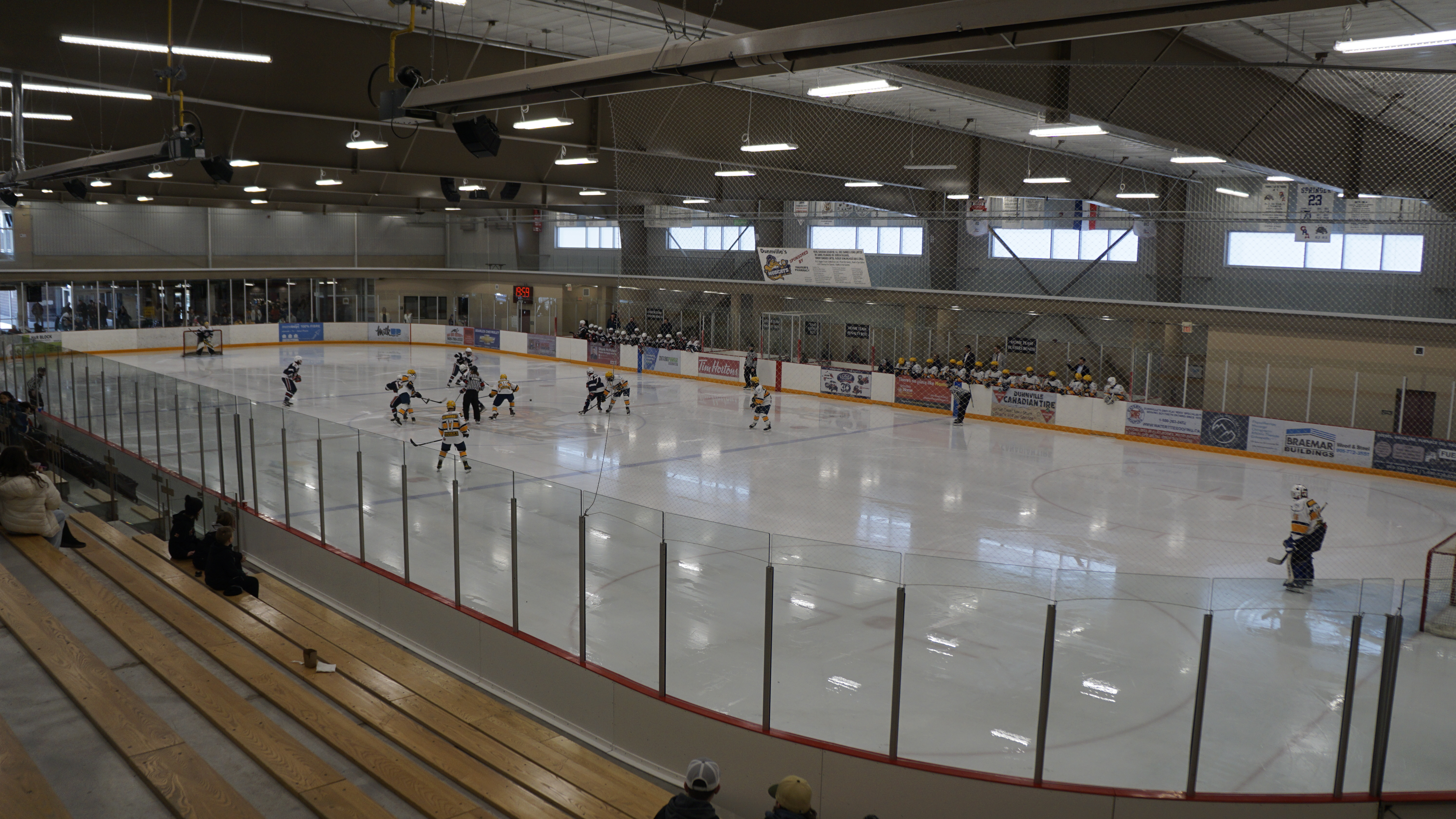
Dunnville Jr. Mudcats Home Game

Dunnville is home to the Dunnville Jr. Mudcats who plays in the Provincial Junior Hockey League.

== Notable people ==
- James N. Allan, politician
- Ryan Barnes, hockey player
- John Bowen, Bishop of Sierra Leone
- Cory Conacher, former National Hockey League (NHL) player for the Ottawa Senators
- Peter DeBoer, NHL coach
- David Fenyves, retired NHL player
- W. A. Fry, Dunnville Chronicle publisher and president of the Ontario Hockey Association, Canadian Amateur Hockey Association and Amateur Athletic Union of Canada
- Jim Gregory, past General Manager for the Toronto Maple Leafs
- Ryan Hayashi, magician
- Nathan Horton, NHL player for the Florida Panthers, Boston Bruins and Columbus Bluejackets
- Matt Roik, professional lacrosse goaltender for the Washington Stealth

== See also ==
- List of unincorporated communities in Ontario
