= St. Catharines/Niagara District Airport =

Airport in Niagara-on-the-Lake, Ontario, Canada

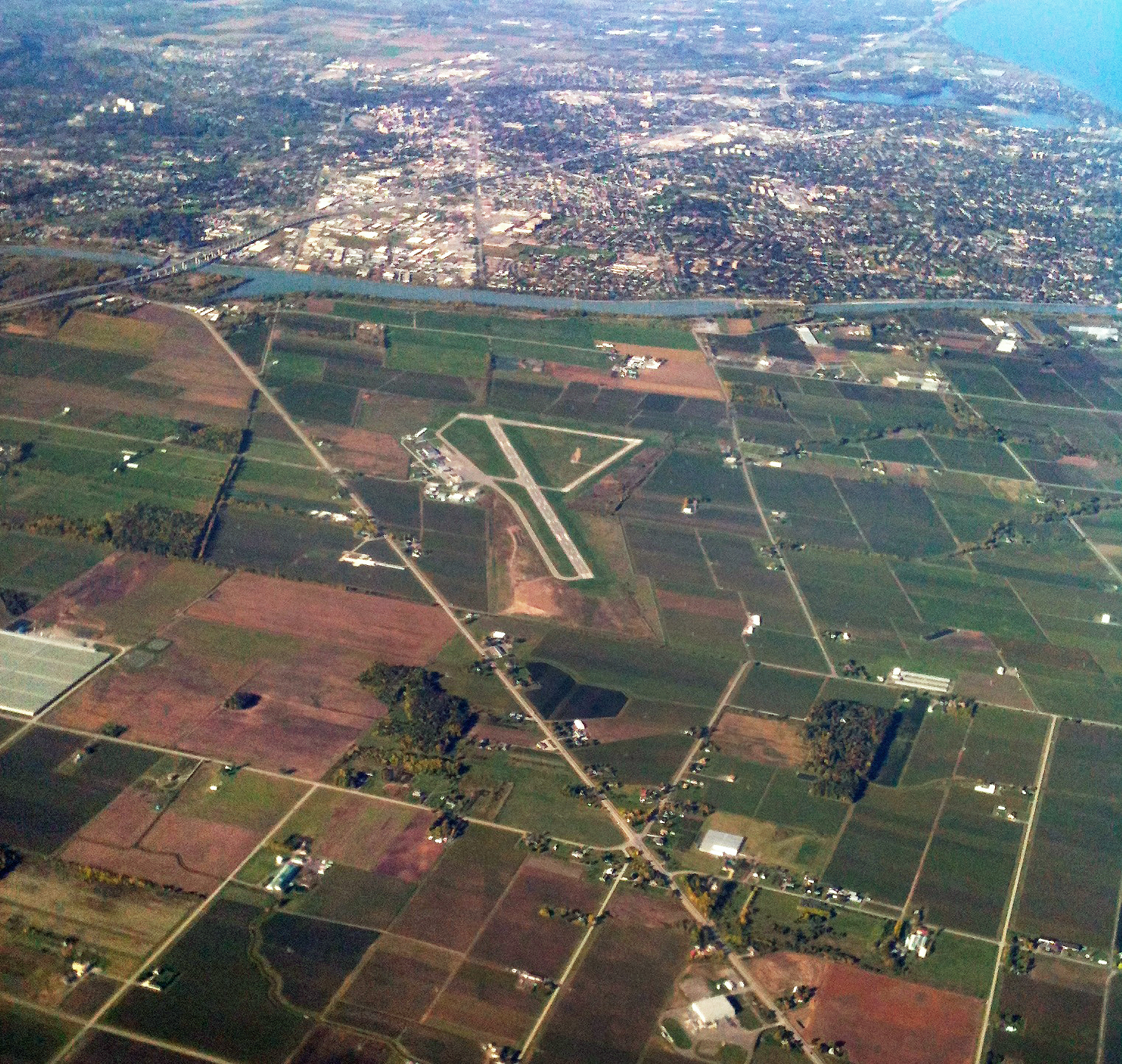
- IATA: YCM; ICAO: CYSN; WMO: 71262

Summary
- Airport type: Public
- Operator: Niagara District Airport Commission
- Location: Niagara-on-the-Lake, Ontario
- Time zone: EST (UTC−05:00)
  - Summer (DST): EDT (UTC−04:00)
- Elevation AMSL: 322 ft (98 m)
- Coordinates: 43°11′30″N 079°10′16″W
- Website: www.niagaradistrictairport.ca

Map
- Location in Ontario

Runways
Direction	Length		Surface
Direction	ft	m	Surface
01/19	2,498	761	Asphalt
06/24	5,000	1,524	Asphalt
11/29	1,988	606	Asphalt

Statistics (2010)
- Aircraft movements: 27,239
- Source: Canada Flight Supplement; Environment Canada; Movements from Statistics Canada

St. Catharines/Niagara District Airport (IATA: YCM, ICAO: CYSN) is a regional airport located in Niagara-on-the-Lake, Ontario, Canada. It is classified as an airport of entry by NAV CANADA and is staffed by the Canada Border Services Agency on a call out basis from the Queenston-Lewiston Bridge. CBSA officers at this airport currently can handle general aviation aircraft only, with no more than 15 passengers.

== History ==
=== Pre-World War II ===
- March 1929 - The St. Catharines Flying Club (S.C.F.C.) completed the requirements necessary to qualify for government assistance.
- June 1929 - The S.C.F.C. received its first aircraft and became operational.
- September 13–15, 1929 - Official opening of the S.C.F.C.

In 1929, the facilities were described by the S.C.F.C. in one of their publications as follows:

Niagara District Airport, established and operated by Haney Repair Service of St. Catharines, comprises about 100 acres and is located immediately south of Canada's busiest provincial highway, No. 8, three miles east of St. Catharines and adjacent to the great Welland Ship Canal.

Though only three months under preparation it affords 2,400-ft. runways in all directions except east and west, where, due to the fact that the field's location in relation to the Niagara Escarpment, makes direct east and west winds almost impossible. A temporary length of 1,200 feet has been prepared.

A light aeroplane hangar has been constructed, Hydro power and telephone installed and gasoline and oil servicing facilities are conveniently located.

The port has a 1,200 ft. highway frontage with a 300 ft. approach and the Airport Inn at this approach. Excellent dining rooms, refreshment stand, tourist hut and dancing services are always available at the Inn and buses taken at convenient intervals for all points from Buffalo to Toronto.

Being located adjacent to the Welland Ship Canal, one mile from the main line of the C.N.R. [Canadian National Railway], three-quarters of a mile from the Queenston Hydro power lines, and in the very centre of the Peninsula's three largest adjacent communities (St. Catharines, Merritton and Thorold) it offers aviation industry all that could be desired and being only one mile from the half-hourly radial service which serves every community on both sides of the Niagara River, it offers easy access to the airways of Canada and the United States.

By arrangement of a grant by the City of St. Catharines covering the club's rental, the St. Catharines Flying Club can operate gratia from the field for a period of five years. Aeronautical Services Ltd. distributors of Curtiss Reid for Lincoln, Welland and Wentworth Counties, also make it their headquarters.

=== World War II - No. 9 Elementary Flying Training School (E.F.T.S.) ===
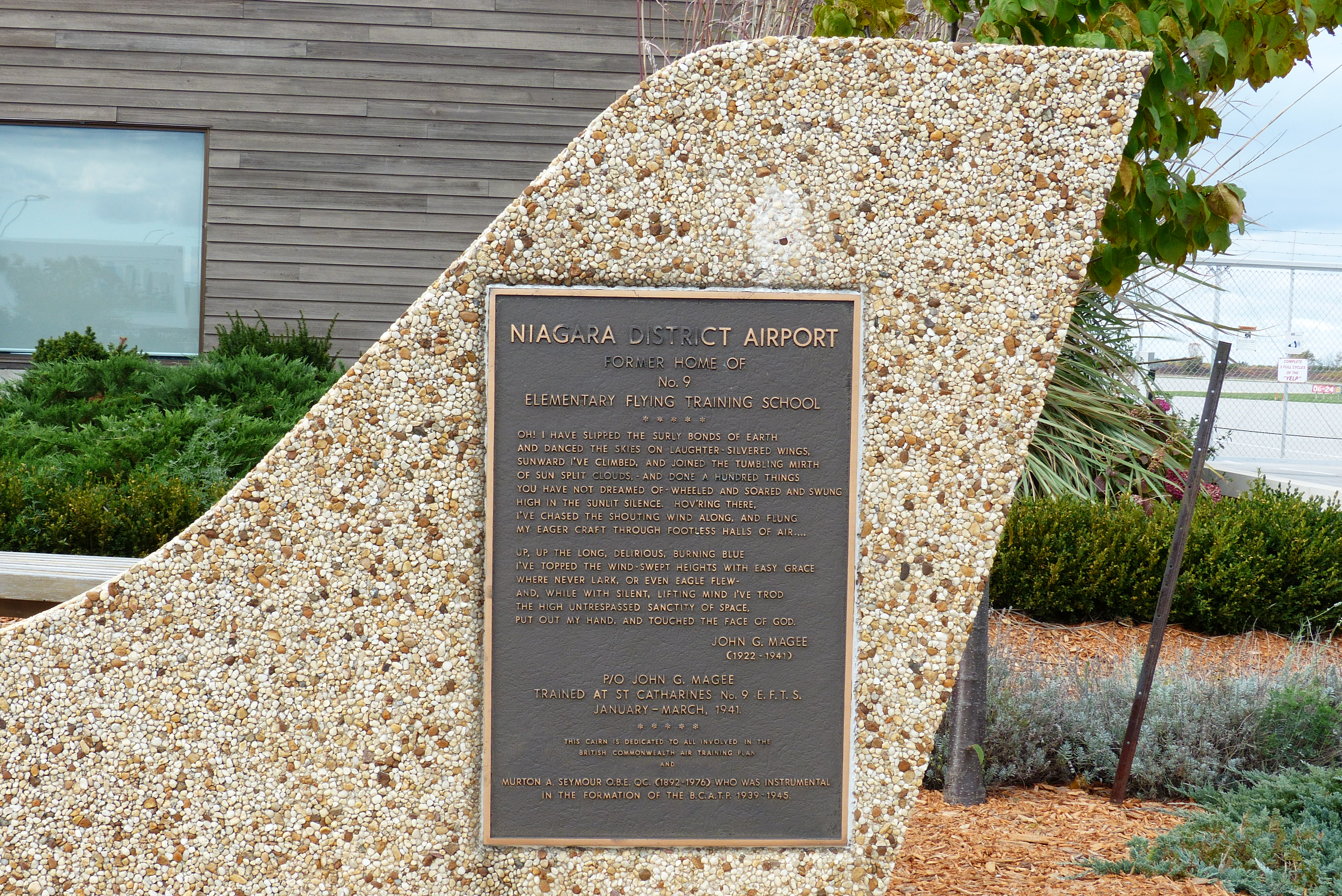
Plaque for the BCATP, No. 9 EFTS, J. G. Magee, Jr.

Murton A. Seymour, president of the St. Catharines Flying Club (S.C.F.C.) was instrumental in forming the Canadian Flying Clubs Association. He travelled to Ottawa in 1939 to meet the Minister of National Defence, Ian Alistair Mackenzie, in an attempt to have the government support air training through existing flying clubs.

With the outbreak of World War II many flying clubs, including the S.C.F.C, saw their resources being stretched to the limit. This was due to new members hoping to gain qualifications in an attempt to automatically qualify for the Royal Canadian Air Force.

Seymour advocated for the placement of an Elementary Flying Training School (E.F.T.S.) at St. Catharines as part of the British Commonwealth Air Training Plan. This goal was realized on 12 August 1940 when the Royal Canadian Air Force Headquarters announced the creation of No. 9 E.F.T.S. to be located at St. Catharines. The school was set to open on 15 March 1941 with an initial intake of 24 students. Shortly thereafter, an order was received from Ottawa announcing that the new opening date was to be 15 October 1940 and that the school was expected to accept 28 students. The manager of the Flying School was Fred Samuel Pattison (previously partner of Haney's Garage)

One of the challenges faced by the S.C.F.C. was soft field conditions. To counter this, construction of new runways began in May 1941, which helped to ensure the permanency of the St. Catharines airport.

No. 9 E.F.T.S. was formally disbanded on 14 January 1944. When the school closed it had accepted 2,468 student pilots. Of these, 1,848 graduated from the program. The total air time for the school was 134,011 hours.

After No. 9 E.F.T.S. was disbanded the airport became home to RCAF No. 4 Wireless School Flying Squadron. This unit was located at the airport until 15 August 1945.

== Airport facilities ==
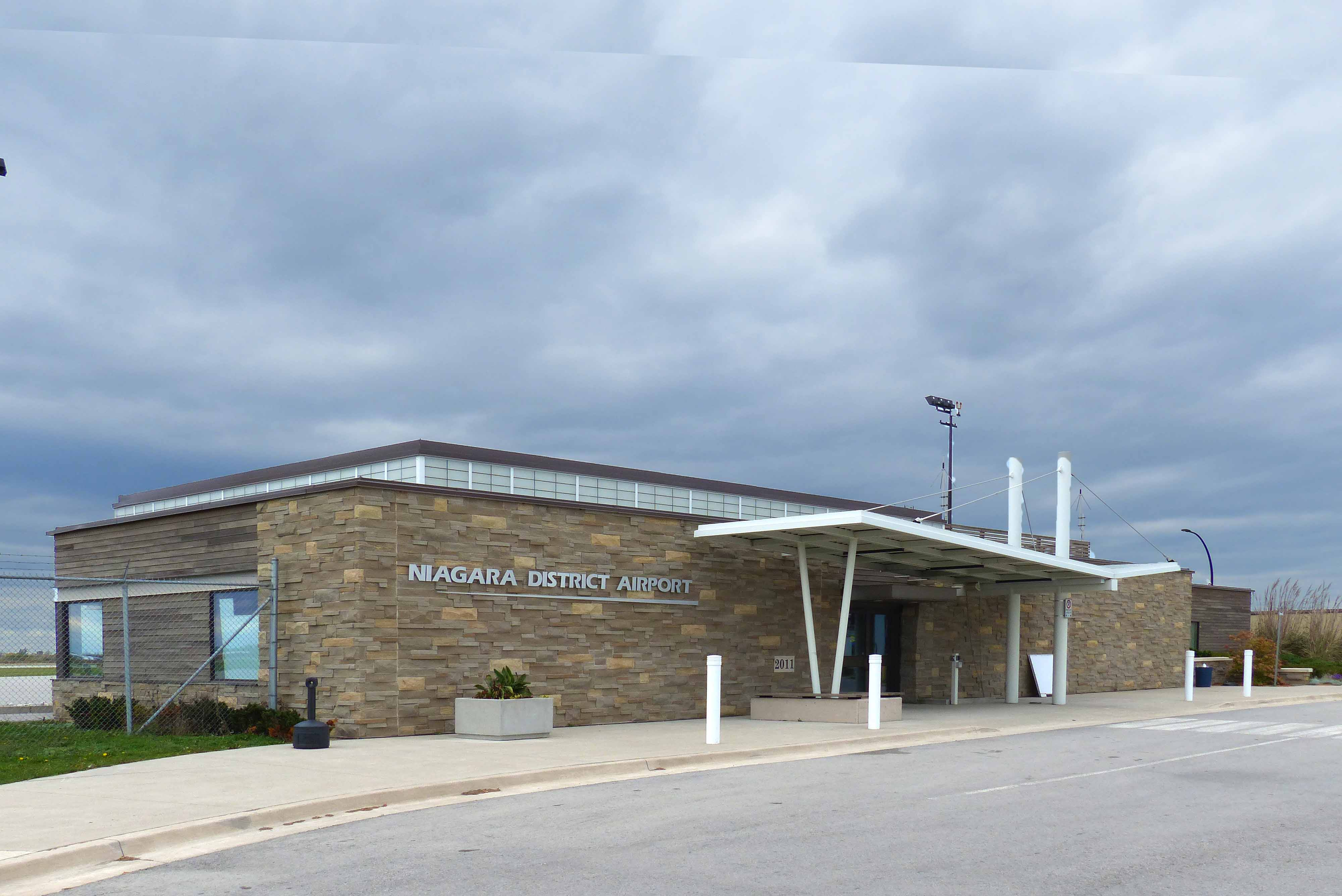
Terminal building

The airport primarily serves general aviation (GA) aircraft, but it is not unusual to see chartered aircraft (turboprops and business jets) delivering passengers to waiting limousines for a ride to the Niagara Fallsview Casino Resort or other local attractions. In the past, the airport has also hosted delivery aircraft bringing rush order parts for the nearby General Motors plants.

The airport is home base for the Civil Air Rescue Emergency Service (CARES) Niagara, Unit #11 of Ontario Civil Air Search and Rescue Association (CASARA). CARES Niagara is an organization that promotes aviation safety and provides civilian voluntary search and rescue (SAR) service in a support role to the Canadian military.

It is also not unusual to see Royal Canadian Air Force search and rescue aircraft on the ramp refuelling while on search and rescue or training missions in the region.

The Southern Ontario Gliding Centre (SOGC) of the Royal Canadian Air Cadets utilize the airport for spring and fall familiarization flights for the cadets.

== Ground Transportation ==
=== Airline coaches ===
Operator	Destinations
Air Canada (operated by Landline)	Toronto–Pearson

Air Canada operates "land-air" motorcoach connection services between St. Catharines/Niagara District Airport and Toronto Pearson International Airport, as they are deemed too close geographically for regularly scheduled flights to be operated economically. The service provides ticketed Air Canada and Star Alliance passengers with multiple daily non-stop ground connections between St. Catharines/Niagara Airport and Terminal 1 at Toronto Pearson.

== Notable flyers ==
- Leonard Birchall - member of the St. Catharines Flying Club in 1932
- John Gillespie Magee, Jr. - trained with No. 9 E.F.T.S. January–March 1941
- Charles Woods - trained with No. 9 E.F.T.S. July–August 1941

== Operators ==
- Allied Aviation
- Civil Air Rescue Emergency Service (CASARA Ontario Unit 11)
- Esso (Imperial Oil)
- FlyGTA Airways
- National Helicopters Inc. (tour and charter service, aerial photography, frost control and agricultural services)
- St. Catharines Flying Club (flight training and Canada's oldest flying club)
- Fox Aviation (charter and tours)

== See also ==
- Niagara Falls/Niagara South Airport
- Niagara Central Airport
