= Canadian federal election results in Hamilton, Burlington and Niagara =

Seats obtained by party
Liberal
Conservative
New Democratic
Progressive Conservative (defunct)

This page shows results of Canadian federal elections in Hamilton, Burlington, and the Niagara Region.

== Regional profile ==
This is arguably the most competitive region in Ontario and one of the most competitive in all of Canada, as all three major parties have significant strength. Traditionally a conservative-leaning area outside of Hamilton and Welland, the Conservatives won the majority of seats in the 1970s and 1980s, aside from 1974 when the Liberals did well, taking six of nine. Before that the Liberals had dominated the area in the 1960s and from 1940 to 1953 with the Conservatives dominating in the two late 1950s elections and in the 1920s and 1930s.

The entire area went for the Liberals in their sweeps of Ontario from 1993 to 2000, with the popularity of local left-leaning Liberal Sheila Copps and the prominence of her parents (Victor and Geraldine) at the municipal level in Hamilton being major factors.

Some of this changed in 2004, the year that happened to coincide with Sheila Copps' departure from federal politics. In Hamilton proper, the New Democratic Party managed to pick up one seat from the Liberals in 2004 and picked up two more in 2006 to sweep urban Hamilton. The Conservatives picked up two seats from the Liberals in 2004 and four more in 2006, leaving the Liberals with only Welland in 2006.

The 2008 and 2011 elections saw the Liberals shutout of the area as the NDP retained its stronghold in Hamilton and added Welland from the Liberals for four seats. The Conservatives claimed the other six ridings in the area each election from 2006 to 2011.

In the 2015 Liberal election victory, the Conservatives held the three most rural ridings plus Niagara Falls, while the NDP retained two of its Hamilton seats, the two fully within the city, but lost its Welland seat (realigned and renamed to Niagara Centre) to the Liberals who claimed the other five seats in the area.

In recent decades, the Liberals have support throughout the region, but no real stronghold of support, which means there are no real safe seats for the party in this area. Several ridings are competitive 3-way districts most elections, although Hamilton's four seats and Niagara Centre generally switch between the Liberals and NDP.

=== Votes by party throughout time ===
Election	Liberal	Conservative	New Democratic	Green	People's	PC	Reform / Alliance	Others
1979	145,976; 32.6%	—N/a	100,729; 22.5%	—N/a	—N/a	198,244; 44.3%	—N/a	1,917; 0.4%
1980	158,449; 36.7%	—N/a	110,720; 25.6%	—N/a	—N/a	160,192; 37.1%	—N/a	1,163; 0.3%
1984	118,577; 25.3%	—N/a	124,216; 26.5%	1,679; 0.4%	—N/a	221,866; 47.4%	—N/a	1,235; 0.3%
1988	167,838; 35.7%	—N/a	107,028; 22.8%	273; 0.1%	—N/a	176,752; 37.6%	—N/a	16,611; 3.5%
1993	244,265; 51.7%	—N/a	25,126; 5.3%	558; 0.1%	—N/a	78,934; 16.7%	113,460; 24.0%	10,274; 2.2%
1997	229,069; 45.7%	—N/a	50,785; 10.1%	974; 0.2%	—N/a	100,925; 20.1%	112,371; 22.4%	7,158; 1.4%
2000	232,252; 47.2%	—N/a	39,678; 8.1%	2,906; 0.6%	—N/a	77,385; 15.7%	134,912; 27.4%	3,448; 0.7%
2004	208,507; 39.7%	169,434; 32.3%	121,262; 23.1%	20,153; 3.8%	—N/a	—N/a	—N/a	5,142; 1.0%
2006	204,069; 34.7%	211,512; 36.0%	144,199; 24.5%	24,144; 4.1%	—N/a	—N/a	—N/a	3,703; 0.6%
2008	146,954; 27.5%	216,635; 40.6%	128,508; 24.1%	37,301; 7.0%	—N/a	—N/a	—N/a	3,263; 0.6%
2011	107,300; 19.1%	262,850; 46.9%	166,045; 29.6%	18,684; 3.3%	—N/a	—N/a	—N/a	4,255; 0.8%
2015	237,146; 39.1%	217,692; 35.9%	129,043; 21.3%	17,654; 2.9%	—N/a	—N/a	—N/a	4,378; 0.7%
2019	252,374; 38.8%	206,438; 31.8%	134,511; 20.7%	39,282; 6.0%	9,537; 1.5%	—N/a	—N/a	7,648; 1.2%
2021	238,257; 37.8%	207,916; 33.0%	129,147; 20.5%	13,848; 2.2%	39,278; 6.2%	—N/a	—N/a	1,062; 0.2%
2025	449,333; 48.3%	414,403; 44.5%	50,997; 5.5%	5,424; 0.6%	7,589; 0.8%	—N/a	—N/a	3,132; 0.3%

Liberal Conservative New Democratic Green People's	Progressive Conservative (defunct) Alliance (defunct) Reform (defunct)

== Detailed results ==
=== 2015 ===
Electoral district	Candidates					Incumbent
Electoral district	Conservative	NDP	Liberal	Green	Other	Incumbent
Burlington	Mike Wallace; 29,780; 42.48%	David Laird; 6,381; 9.10%	Karina Gould; 32,229; 45.98%	Vince Fiorito; 1,710; 2.44%		Mike Wallace
Flamborough—Glanbrook	David Sweet; 24,137; 43.48%	Mike DiLivio; 7,779; 14.01%	Jennifer Stebbing; 21,728; 39.14%	David Allan Urquhart; 1,866; 3.36%		New District
Hamilton Centre	Yonatan Rozenszajn; 6,018; 14.65%	David Christopherson; 18,719; 45.56%	Anne Tennier; 13,718; 33.39%	Ute Schmid-Jones; 1,778; 4.33%	Maria Anastasiou (Ind.); 186 0.45%	David Christopherson
Hamilton Centre	Yonatan Rozenszajn; 6,018; 14.65%	David Christopherson; 18,719; 45.56%	Anne Tennier; 13,718; 33.39%	Ute Schmid-Jones; 1,778; 4.33%	Michael James Baldasaro (Mar.); 348 0.85%	David Christopherson
Hamilton Centre	Yonatan Rozenszajn; 6,018; 14.65%	David Christopherson; 18,719; 45.56%	Anne Tennier; 13,718; 33.39%	Ute Schmid-Jones; 1,778; 4.33%	Rob Young (Libert.); 316 0.77%	David Christopherson
Hamilton East— Stoney Creek	Diane Bubanko; 12,715; 25.26%	Wayne Marston; 16,465; 32.71%	Bob Bratina; 19,622; 38.99%	Erin Davis; 1,305; 2.59%	Wendell Fields (M-L); 55 0.11%	Wayne Marston
Hamilton East— Stoney Creek	Diane Bubanko; 12,715; 25.26%	Wayne Marston; 16,465; 32.71%	Bob Bratina; 19,622; 38.99%	Erin Davis; 1,305; 2.59%	Bob Mann (Comm.); 170 0.34%	Wayne Marston
Hamilton Mountain	Al Miles; 12,991; 25.70%	Scott Duvall; 18,146; 35.89%	Shaun Burt; 16,933; 33.49%	Raheem Aman; 1,283; 2.54%	Andrew James Caton (Libert.); 763 1.51%	Chris Charlton†
Hamilton Mountain	Al Miles; 12,991; 25.70%	Scott Duvall; 18,146; 35.89%	Shaun Burt; 16,933; 33.49%	Raheem Aman; 1,283; 2.54%	Jim Enos (CHP); 438 0.87%	Chris Charlton†
Hamilton West— Ancaster—Dundas	Vincent Samuel; 19,821; 31.83%	Alex Johnstone; 10,131; 16.27%	Filomena Tassi; 29,694; 47.68%	Peter Ormond; 2,633; 4.23%		David Sweet‡ Ancaster—Dundas— Flamborough—Westdale
Milton	Lisa Raitt; 22,378; 45.38%	Alex Anabusi; 5,366; 10.88%	Azim Rizvee; 19,940; 40.44%	Mini Batra; 1,131; 2.29%	Chris Jewell (Libert.); 493; 1.00%	New District
Niagara Centre	Leanna Villella; 16,248; 29.71%	Malcolm Allen; 17,218; 31.49%	Vance Badawey; 19,513; 35.68%	David Clow; 1,316; 2.41%	Jody Di Bartolomeo (Animal All.); 291 0.53%	Malcolm Allen; Welland
Niagara Centre	Leanna Villella; 16,248; 29.71%	Malcolm Allen; 17,218; 31.49%	Vance Badawey; 19,513; 35.68%	David Clow; 1,316; 2.41%	Ron J. Walker (M-L); 96 0.18%	Malcolm Allen; Welland
Niagara Falls	Rob Nicholson; 27,235; 42.09%	Carolynn Ioannoni; 13,525; 20.90%	Ron Planche; 22,318; 34.49%	Steven Soos; 1,633; 2.52%		Rob Nicholson
Niagara West	Dean Allison; 24,732; 48.82%	Nameer Rahman; 5,802; 11.45%	Phil Rose; 16,581; 32.73%	Sid Frere; 1,511; 2.98%	Allan de Roo (Libert.); 797 1.57%	Dean Allison; Niagara West—Glanbrook
Niagara West	Dean Allison; 24,732; 48.82%	Nameer Rahman; 5,802; 11.45%	Phil Rose; 16,581; 32.73%	Sid Frere; 1,511; 2.98%	Harold Jonker (CHP); 1,234 2.44%	Dean Allison; Niagara West—Glanbrook
St. Catharines	Rick Dykstra; 21,637; 37.57%	Susan Erskine-Fournier; 9,511; 16.51%	Chris Bittle; 24,870; 43.18%	Jim Fannon; 1,488; 2.58%	Saleh Waziruddin (Comm.); 85; 0.15%	Rick Dykstra

=== 2011 ===
Electoral district	Candidates						Incumbent
Electoral district	Conservative	Liberal	NDP	Green	Christian Heritage	Other	Incumbent
Ancaster—Dundas— Flamborough—Westdale	David Sweet; 30,240; 51.25%	Dave Braden; 14,594; 24.74%	Nancy MacBain; 10,956; 18.57%	Peter Michael Ormond; 2,963; 5.02%		Jamilé Ghaddar (M-L); 77 0.13	David Sweet
Ancaster—Dundas— Flamborough—Westdale	David Sweet; 30,240; 51.25%	Dave Braden; 14,594; 24.74%	Nancy MacBain; 10,956; 18.57%	Peter Michael Ormond; 2,963; 5.02%		Anthony Giles (Libert.); 170 0.29	David Sweet
Burlington	Mike Wallace; 32,958; 54.16%	Alyssa Brierley; 14,154; 23.26%	David Laird; 11,449; 18.81%	Graham Reid Mayberry; 2,151; 3.53%		Elaine Baetz (M-L); 140; 0.23%	Mike Wallace
Halton	Lisa Raitt; 44,214; 54.52%	Connie Laurin-Bowie; 20,903; 25.77%	Pat Heroux; 12,960; 15.98%	Judi Remigio; 2,778; 3.43%	Tony Rodrigues; 249; 0.31%		Lisa Raitt
Hamilton Centre	Jim Byron; 11,020; 26.36%	Anne Tennier; 5,912; 14.14%	David Christopherson; 23,849; 57.04%			Michael Baldasaro (Mar.); 780 1.87%	David Christopherson
Hamilton Centre	Jim Byron; 11,020; 26.36%	Anne Tennier; 5,912; 14.14%	David Christopherson; 23,849; 57.04%			Lisa Nussey (M-L); 252 0.60%	David Christopherson
Hamilton East— Stoney Creek	Brad Clark; 17,567; 36.19%	Michelle Stockwell; 6,411; 13.21%	Wayne Marston; 21,931; 45.18%	Dave Hart Dyke; 1,450; 2.99%		Wendell Fields (M-L); 95 0.20%	Wayne Marston
Hamilton East— Stoney Creek	Brad Clark; 17,567; 36.19%	Michelle Stockwell; 6,411; 13.21%	Wayne Marston; 21,931; 45.18%	Dave Hart Dyke; 1,450; 2.99%		Gord Hill (PC); 468 0.96%	Wayne Marston
Hamilton East— Stoney Creek	Brad Clark; 17,567; 36.19%	Michelle Stockwell; 6,411; 13.21%	Wayne Marston; 21,931; 45.18%	Dave Hart Dyke; 1,450; 2.99%		Bob Green Innes (CAP); 92 0.19%	Wayne Marston
Hamilton East— Stoney Creek	Brad Clark; 17,567; 36.19%	Michelle Stockwell; 6,411; 13.21%	Wayne Marston; 21,931; 45.18%	Dave Hart Dyke; 1,450; 2.99%		Bob Mann (Comm.); 138 0.28%	Wayne Marston
Hamilton East— Stoney Creek	Brad Clark; 17,567; 36.19%	Michelle Stockwell; 6,411; 13.21%	Wayne Marston; 21,931; 45.18%	Dave Hart Dyke; 1,450; 2.99%		Greg Pattinson (Libert.); 385 0.79%	Wayne Marston
Hamilton Mountain	Terry Anderson; 17,936; 33.05%	Marie Bountrogianni; 8,787; 16.19%	Chris Charlton; 25,595; 47.17%	Stephen Brotherson; 1,505; 2.77%	Jim Enos; 270; 0.50%	Henryk Adamiec (Ind.); 171; 0.32%	Chris Charlton
Niagara Falls	Rob Nicholson; 28,748; 53.26%	Bev Hodgson; 10,206; 18.91%	Heather Kelley; 12,681; 23.49%	Shawn Willick; 2,086; 3.86%	Harold Jonker; 259; 0.48%		Rob Nicholson
Niagara West—Glanbrook	Dean Allison; 33,701; 57.25%	Stephen Bieda; 8,699; 14.78%	David Heatley; 12,734; 21.63%	Sid Frere; 2,530; 4.30%	Bryan Jongbloed; 1,199; 2.04%		Dean Allison
St. Catharines	Rick Dykstra; 25,571; 50.86%	Andrew Gill; 10,358; 20.60%	Mike Williams; 11,973; 23.82%	Jennifer Mooradian; 1,924; 3.83%	Dave Bylsma; 357; 0.71%	Saleh Waziruddin (Comm.); 91; 0.18%	Rick Dykstra
Welland	Leanna Villella; 20,895; 40.24%	John Maloney; 7,276; 14.01%	Malcolm Allen; 21,917; 42.21%	Robin Williamson; 1,297; 2.50%	David Vangoolen; 299; 0.58%	Ray Game (Ind.); 169 0.33%	Malcolm Allen
Welland	Leanna Villella; 20,895; 40.24%	John Maloney; 7,276; 14.01%	Malcolm Allen; 21,917; 42.21%	Robin Williamson; 1,297; 2.50%	David Vangoolen; 299; 0.58%	Ron Walker (M-L); 71 0.14%	Malcolm Allen

=== 2008 ===
Electoral district	Candidates					Incumbent
Electoral district	Conservative	Liberal	NDP	Green	Other	Incumbent
Ancaster—Dundas—Flamborough—Westdale	David Sweet; 26,297; 46.50%	Arlene MacFarlane-VanderBeek; 15,322; 27.10%	Gordon Guyatt; 9,632; 17.03%	Peter Ormond; 5,149; 9.11%	Jamie Ghaddar (M-L); 148; 0.26%	David Sweet
Burlington	Mike Wallace; 28,614; 48.60%	Paddy Torsney; 19,577; 33.25%	David Laird; 6,597; 11.21%	Marnie Mellish; 4,083; 6.94%		Mike Wallace
Halton	Lisa Raitt; 32,986; 47.50%	Garth Turner; 25,136; 36.19%	Robert Wagner; 6,118; 8.81%	Amy Collard; 4,872; 7.02%	Tony Rodrigues (CHP); 337; 0.49%	Garth Turner
Hamilton Centre	Leon O'Connor; 9,051; 22.28%	Helen M. Wilson; 7,164; 17.63%	David Christopherson; 20,010; 49.25%	John Livingstone; 3,625; 8.92%	Anthony Giles (Libert.); 528 1.30%	David Christopherson
Hamilton Centre	Leon O'Connor; 9,051; 22.28%	Helen M. Wilson; 7,164; 17.63%	David Christopherson; 20,010; 49.25%	John Livingstone; 3,625; 8.92%	Lisa Nussey (M-L); 126 0.31%	David Christopherson
Hamilton Centre	Leon O'Connor; 9,051; 22.28%	Helen M. Wilson; 7,164; 17.63%	David Christopherson; 20,010; 49.25%	John Livingstone; 3,625; 8.92%	Ryan Sparrow (Comm.); 125 0.31%	David Christopherson
Hamilton East—Stoney Creek	Frank Rukavina; 11,556; 23.95%	Larry Di Ianni; 13,445; 27.89%	Wayne Marston; 19,919; 41.28%	Dave William Hart Dyke; 2,142; 4.44%	Sam Cino (Ind.); 323 0.67%	Wayne Marston
Hamilton East—Stoney Creek	Frank Rukavina; 11,556; 23.95%	Larry Di Ianni; 13,445; 27.89%	Wayne Marston; 19,919; 41.28%	Dave William Hart Dyke; 2,142; 4.44%	Gord Hill (PC); 853 1.77%	Wayne Marston
Hamilton Mountain	Terry Anderson; 16,010; 30.66%	Tyler Banham; 10,531; 20.17%	Chris Charlton; 22,796; 43.65%	Stephen Brotherston; 2,884; 5.52%		Chris Charlton
Niagara Falls	Rob Nicholson; 24,016; 46.70%	Joyce Morocco; 13,867; 26.97%	Eric Gillespie; 9,186; 17.86%	Shawn Willick; 4,356; 8.47%		Rob Nicholson
Niagara West—Glanbrook	Dean Allison; 28,089; 51.98%	Heather Carter; 12,955; 23.97%	Dave Heatley; 7,980; 14.77%	Sid Frere; 3,897; 7.21%	Dave Bylsma (CHP); 1,118; 2.07%	Dean Allison
St. Catharines	Rick Dykstra; 23,474; 45.90%	Walt Lastewka; 14,652; 28.65%	George N. Addison; 9,428; 18.43%	Jim Fannon; 3,477; 6.80%	Sam Hammond (Comm.); 113; 0.22%	Rick Dykstra
Welland	Alf Kiers; 16,542; 32.32%	John Maloney; 14,295; 27.93%	Malcolm Allen; 16,842; 32.91%	Jennifer Mooradian; 2,816; 5.50%	Jody Di Bartolomeo (Ind.); 569 1.11%	John Maloney
Welland	Alf Kiers; 16,542; 32.32%	John Maloney; 14,295; 27.93%	Malcolm Allen; 16,842; 32.91%	Jennifer Mooradian; 2,816; 5.50%	Ron Walker (M-L); 114 0.22%	John Maloney

=== 2006 ===
==== Party rankings ====
Continuing the trend started in 2004, the Liberal lost all but one seat in the region but managed to arrive second in all the remaining 9 seats. The Conservatives and NDP managed to win 6 and 3 seats respectively but the Conservatives failed to arrive second in the 4 seats they lost and the NDP only arrived second in one riding.

Parties	1st	2nd	3rd	4th
Conservative	6	0	4	0
New Democratic	3	1	6	0
Liberal	1	9	0	0
Green	0	0	0	10

==== Results by riding ====
Electoral district	Candidates					Incumbent
Electoral district	Liberal	Conservative	NDP	Green	Other	Incumbent
Ancaster—Dundas— Flamborough—Westdale	Russ Powers; 21,656; 34.51%	David Sweet; 24,530; 39.10%	Gordon Guyatt; 13,376; 21.32%	David Januczkowski; 2,767; 4.41%	Ben Cowie (Ind.); 303 0.48%	Russ Powers
Ancaster—Dundas— Flamborough—Westdale	Russ Powers; 21,656; 34.51%	David Sweet; 24,530; 39.10%	Gordon Guyatt; 13,376; 21.32%	David Januczkowski; 2,767; 4.41%	Jamilé Ghaddar (M-L); 112 0.18%	Russ Powers
Burlington	Paddy Torsney; 25,431; 39.11%	Mike Wallace; 28,030; 43.11%	David Laird; 8,090; 12.44%	Rick Goldring; 3,471; 5.34%		Paddy Torsney
Halton	Gary Carr; 28,680; 41.44%	Garth Turner; 30,577; 44.18%	Anwar Naqvi; 6,114; 8.83%	Kyle Grice; 3,843; 5.55%		Gary Carr
Hamilton Centre	Javid Mirza; 11,224; 23.49%	Eliot Lewis Hill; 9,696; 20.29%	David Christopherson; 24,503; 51.29%	John Livingstone; 2,022; 4.23%	Tony Des Lauriers (CAP); 332; 0.69%	David Christopherson
Hamilton East—Stoney Creek	Tony Valeri; 18,880; 35.16%	Frank Rukavina; 13,581; 25.29%	Wayne Marston; 19,346; 36.03%	Jo Pavlov; 1,573; 2.93%	Bob Mann (Comm.); 316; 0.59%	Tony Valeri
Hamilton Mountain	Bill Kelly; 18,704; 31.87%	Don Graves; 15,915; 27.11%	Chris Charlton; 21,970; 37.43%	Susan Wadsworth; 1,517; 2.58%	Stephen Downey (CHP); 458 0.78%	Beth Phinney†
Hamilton Mountain	Bill Kelly; 18,704; 31.87%	Don Graves; 15,915; 27.11%	Chris Charlton; 21,970; 37.43%	Susan Wadsworth; 1,517; 2.58%	Paul Lane (M-L); 132 0.22%	Beth Phinney†
Niagara Falls	Gary Burroughs; 20,092; 34.53%	Rob Nicholson; 23,485; 40.36%	Wayne Gates; 12,209; 20.98%	Kay Green; 2,402; 4.13%		Rob Nicholson
Niagara West—Glanbrook	Heather Carter; 17,712; 30.68%	Dean Allison; 27,351; 47.38%	Dave Heatley; 9,251; 16.02%	Tom Ferguson; 2,284; 3.96%	David W. Bylsma (CHP); 1,132; 1.96%	Dean Allison
St. Catharines	Walt Lastewka; 21,423; 37.05%	Richard Dykstra; 21,669; 37.47%	Jeff Burch; 11,848; 20.49%	Jim Fannon; 2,305; 3.99%	Bill Bylsma (CHP); 481 0.83%	Walt Lastewka
St. Catharines	Walt Lastewka; 21,423; 37.05%	Richard Dykstra; 21,669; 37.47%	Jeff Burch; 11,848; 20.49%	Jim Fannon; 2,305; 3.99%	Elaine Couto (M-L); 101 0.17%	Walt Lastewka
Welland	John Maloney; 20,267; 35.53%	Mel Grunstein; 16,678; 29.23%	Jody Di Bartolomeo; 17,492; 30.66%	Brian Simpson; 1,960; 3.44%	Irma Ruiter (CHP); 539 0.94%	John Maloney
Welland	John Maloney; 20,267; 35.53%	Mel Grunstein; 16,678; 29.23%	Jody Di Bartolomeo; 17,492; 30.66%	Brian Simpson; 1,960; 3.44%	Ron Walker (M-L); 113 0.20%	John Maloney

=== 2004 ===
==== Party rankings ====
Parties	1st	2nd	3rd	4th
Liberal	7	3	0	0
Conservative	2	4	4	0
New Democratic	1	3	6	0
Green	0	0	0	10

==== Results by riding ====
Electoral district	Candidates						Incumbent
Electoral district	Liberal	Conservative	NDP	Green	Christian Heritage	Other	Incumbent
Ancaster—Dundas—Flamborough—Westdale	Russ Powers; 21,935; 39.69%	David Sweet; 19,135; 34.63%	Gordon Guyatt; 11,557; 20.91%	David Januczkowski; 2,636; 4.77%			John Bryden§ (Note: Elected as a Liberal in the previous election, left the Liberal Party in February 2004 and joined the Conservative caucus.); Ancaster—Dundas—Flamborough—Aldershot
Burlington	Paddy Torsney; 27,423; 44.96%	Mike Wallace; 23,389; 38.35%	David Carter Laird; 6,581; 10.79%	Angela Reid; 3,169; 5.20%	John Herman Wubs; 429; 0.70%		Paddy Torsney
Halton	Gary Carr; 27,362; 48.35%	Dean Martin; 21,704; 38.35%	Anwar Naqvi; 4,642; 8.20%	Frank Marchetti; 2,889; 5.10%			Julian Reed†
Hamilton Centre	Stan Keyes; 14,948; 33.70%	Leon Patrick O'Connor; 6,714; 15.13%	David Christopherson; 20,321; 45.81%	Anne Marie Pavlov; 1,422; 3.21%	Stephen Downey; 520; 1.17%	Michael James Baldasaro (NA); 345 0.78%	Stan Keyes; Hamilton West
Hamilton Centre	Stan Keyes; 14,948; 33.70%	Leon Patrick O'Connor; 6,714; 15.13%	David Christopherson; 20,321; 45.81%	Anne Marie Pavlov; 1,422; 3.21%	Stephen Downey; 520; 1.17%	Jamilé Ghaddar (M-L); 91 0.21%	Stan Keyes; Hamilton West
Hamilton East—Stoney Creek	Tony Valeri; 18,417; 37.74%	Fred Eisenberger; 10,888; 22.31%	Tony DePaulo; 17,490; 35.84%	Richard Safka; 1,446; 2.96%		Sam Cino (Ind.); 393 0.81% ———— Bob Mann (Comm.); 166 0.34%	Tony Valeri; Stoney Creek
Hamilton East—Stoney Creek	Tony Valeri; 18,417; 37.74%	Fred Eisenberger; 10,888; 22.31%	Tony DePaulo; 17,490; 35.84%	Richard Safka; 1,446; 2.96%		Sam Cino (Ind.); 393 0.81% ———— Bob Mann (Comm.); 166 0.34%	merged district
Hamilton East—Stoney Creek	Tony Valeri; 18,417; 37.74%	Fred Eisenberger; 10,888; 22.31%	Tony DePaulo; 17,490; 35.84%	Richard Safka; 1,446; 2.96%		Sam Cino (Ind.); 393 0.81% ———— Bob Mann (Comm.); 166 0.34%	Sheila Copps§ Hamilton East
Hamilton Mountain	Beth Phinney; 18,548; 34.81%	Tom Jackson; 15,590; 29.26%	Chris Charlton; 17,552; 32.94%	Jo Pavlov; 1,378; 2.59%		Paul Lane (M-L); 214; 0.40%	Beth Phinney
Niagara Falls	Victor Pietrangelo; 18,745; 36.48%	Rob Nicholson; 19,882; 38.70%	Wayne Gates; 10,680; 20.79%	Ted Mousseau; 2,071; 4.03%			Gary Pillitteri†
Niagara West—Glanbrook	Debbie Zimmerman; 20,210; 39.01%	Dean Allison; 20,874; 40.29%	Dave Heatley; 7,681; 14.82%	Tom Ferguson; 1,761; 3.40%	David Bylsma; 1,107; 2.14%	Phil Rose (CAP); 179; 0.35%	new district
St. Catharines	Walt Lastewka; 21,277; 40.44%	Leo Bonomi; 18,261; 34.71%	Ted Mouradian; 10,135; 19.26%	Jim Fannon; 1,927; 3.66%	Linda Klassen; 751; 1.43%	Elaine Couto (M-L); 61 0.12%	Walt Lastewka
St. Catharines	Walt Lastewka; 21,277; 40.44%	Leo Bonomi; 18,261; 34.71%	Ted Mouradian; 10,135; 19.26%	Jim Fannon; 1,927; 3.66%	Linda Klassen; 751; 1.43%	Jane Elizabeth Paxton (CAP); 204 0.39%	Walt Lastewka
Welland	John Maloney; 19,642; 39.63%	Mel Grunstein; 12,997; 26.22%	Jody Di Bartolomeo; 14,623; 29.50%	Ryan McLaughlin; 1,454; 2.93%	Irma D. Ruiter; 735; 1.48%	Ron Walker (M-L); 113; 0.23%	John Maloney; Erie—Lincoln
Welland	John Maloney; 19,642; 39.63%	Mel Grunstein; 12,997; 26.22%	Jody Di Bartolomeo; 14,623; 29.50%	Ryan McLaughlin; 1,454; 2.93%	Irma D. Ruiter; 735; 1.48%	Ron Walker (M-L); 113; 0.23%	merged district
Welland	John Maloney; 19,642; 39.63%	Mel Grunstein; 12,997; 26.22%	Jody Di Bartolomeo; 14,623; 29.50%	Ryan McLaughlin; 1,454; 2.93%	Irma D. Ruiter; 735; 1.48%	Ron Walker (M-L); 113; 0.23%	Tony Tirabassi§ Niagara Centre

==== Maps ====
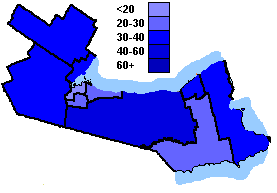
Conservative Party of Canada

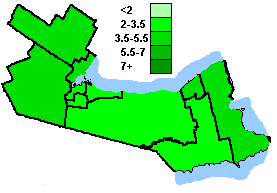
Green Party of Canada

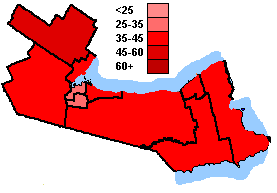
Liberal Party of Canada

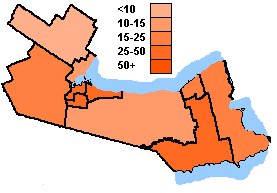
New Democratic Party

=== 2000 ===
==== Party rankings ====
The Liberals recorded their third consecutive clean sweep of the region. The Canadian Alliance was much more competitive than the Reform Party in 1997, arriving second in all 11 ridings. Both the Progressive Conservatives and the NDP achieved worse results than in 1997.

Parties	1st	2nd	3rd	4th
Liberal	11	0	0	0
Alliance	0	11	0	0
Progressive Conservative	0	0	8	3
New Democratic	0	0	3	8

Electoral district	Candidates					Incumbent
Electoral district	Liberal	Canadian Alliance	NDP	PC	Other	Incumbent
Ancaster—Dundas—Flamborough—Aldershot	John H. Bryden; 19,921	Ray Pennings; 15,272	Gordon Guyatt; 3,756	Gerry Aggus; 9,451		John H. Bryden; Wentworth—Burlington
Burlington	Paddy Torsney; 22,175	Don Pennell; 11,500	Larry Mcmahon; 1,722	Stephen Collinson; 11,240	771	Paddy Torsney
Erie—Lincoln	John Maloney; 17,054	Dean Allison; 14,992	Jody Di Bartolomeo; 2,423	David Hurren; 5,174	756	John Maloney
Halton	Julian Reed; 28,168	Tim Dobson; 15,656	Brenda Dolling; 2,633	Tom Kilmer; 12,114	1,018	Julian Reed
Hamilton East	Sheila Copps; 16,435	Joshua Conroy; 6,039	Jim Stevenson; 4,111	Steven Knight; 3,321	1,191	Sheila Copps
Hamilton Mountain	Beth Phinney; 22,536	Mike Scott; 9,621	James Stephenson; 4,387	John Smith; 7,467	259	Beth Phinney
Hamilton West	Stan Keyes; 21,273	Leon O'Connor; 7,295	Catherine Hudson; 5,300	Ron Blackie; 5,024	1,462	Stan Keyes
Niagara Centre	Tony Tirabassi; 21,641	Bernie Law; 13,313	Mike Grimaldi; 7,029	Joe Atkinson; 4,893	439	Gilbert Parent
Niagara Falls	Gary Pillitteri; 17,907	Mel Grunstein; 11,999	Ed Booker; 2,356	Tony Baldinelli; 6,077	656	Gary Pillitteri
St. Catharines	Walt Lastewka; 20,992	Randy Taylor Dumont; 15,871	John Bacher; 2,878	Kenneth David Atkinson; 6,522	462	Walt Lastewka
Stoney Creek	Tony Valeri; 24,150	Doug Conley; 13,354	Mark Davies; 3,083	Grant Howell; 6,102	587	Tony Valeri

=== 1997 ===
==== Party rankings ====
Parties	1st	2nd	3rd	4th
Liberal	11	0	0	0
Reform	0	5	5	1
Progressive Conservative	0	4	6	1
New Democratic	0	2	0	9

Electoral district	Candidates					Incumbent
Electoral district	Liberal	Reform	NDP	PC	Other	Incumbent
Burlington	Paddy Torsney; 22,042	Terry Lamping; 8,662	Jim Hough; 2,561	Mike Kuegle; 16,344	352	Paddy Torsney
Erie—Lincoln	John Maloney; 17,542	Jim Macinnis; 12,788	Willem Hanrath; 2,509	Gord Clare; 6,317	1,796	John Maloney; Erie
Halton	Julian Reed; 26,017	Richard Malboeuf; 12,221	Jay Jackson; 2,452	Ralph Scholtens; 13,778	600	New district
Hamilton East	Sheila Copps; 16,991	Kevin Samuel Barber; 5,716	Wayne Marston; 6,870	Michael Hilson; 3,913	848	Sheila Copps
Hamilton Mountain	Beth Phinney; 21,128	Richard F. Gaasenbeek; 8,154	Chris Charlton; 7,440	John Smith; 8,877	520	Beth Phinney
Hamilton West	Stan Keyes; 20,951	Ken Griffith; 6,285	Andrea Horwath; 7,648	John Findlay; 6,510	493	Stan Keyes
Niagara Centre	Gilbert Parent; 24,115	Don Johnstone; 12,053	James Wilson; 5,510	Joe Atkinson; 5,827	1,021	Gilbert Parent; Welland—St. Catharines—Thorold
Niagara Falls	Gary Pillitteri; 15,868	Mel Grunstein; 10,986	John Cowan; 4,052	Rob Nicholson; 9,935	528	Gary Pillitteri
St. Catharines	Walt Lastewka; 21,081	Rob Hesp; 15,029	Ed Gould; 4,657	Gregg Crealock; 6,503	1,241	Walt Lastewka
Stoney Creek	Tony Valeri; 23,750	Clay Downes; 10,210	Peter Cassidy; 3,392	Angie Tomasic; 9,440	733	Tony Valeri; Lincoln
Wentworth—Burlington	John H. Bryden; 19,584	Allan Lonn; 10,267	Jessica Brennan; 3,694	Gerry Aggus; 13,481		John H. Bryden; Hamilton—Wentworth
