= 1976 Ontario municipal elections =

Canadian Local Election

All municipalities in the Canadian province of Ontario held municipal elections on December 6, 1976, to elect mayors or reeves, councillors, and school board trustees. Some areas also held local referendums.

David Crombie, a Red Tory, was re-elected as mayor of Toronto without serious opposition.

== Elected mayors and reeves ==
- Ajax: Clark Mason
- Barrie: Ross Archer
- Belleville: J. Ben Corke
- Brampton: James Archdekin
- Brantford: Charles Bowen (details)
- Brockville: Robert Sheridan
- Burlington: Mary Munro
- Caledon: John Clarkson
- Cambridge: Erwin Nelson
- Chatham: Curtis Carter
- Cornwall: Gerald Parisien
- Dundas: Joe Bennett
- East York: Alan Redway (details)
- Etobicoke: Dennis Flynn (details)
- Flamborough: Ken Harper
- Fort Erie: Girve Fretz
- Georgina: George Burrows
- Gloucester: Bob MacQuarrie
- Grimsby: Robert Arkell
- Guelph: Norm Jary
- Haldimand: David Peirson
- Halton Hills: Tom Hill
- Hamilton: Jack MacDonald
- Kingston: Kenneth Keyes
- Kingston (Township): Peter Beeman
- Kitchener: Morley Rosenberg
- London: Jane Bigelow
- Markham: Tony Roman
- Milton: Donald Gordon
- Mississauga: Ronald Searle (details)
- Nanticoke: George Dmetriuc
- Nepean: Andy Haydon
- Newcastle: Garnet Rickard
- Newmarket: Bob Forhan
- Niagara Falls: George Bukator
- North Bay: Merle Dickerson
- North York: Mel Lastman (details)
- Oakville: Harry Barrett
- Orillia: Frank Dolcort
- Oshawa: Jim Potticary
- Ottawa: Lorry Greenberg (details)
- Owen Sound: Bob Rutherford
- Peterborough: Cameron Wasson
- Pickering: George Ashe
- Port Colborne: Bob Saracino
- Rayside-Balfour: Gilles Pelland
- Richmond Hill: David Schiller
- Sarnia: Andy Brandt
- Sault Ste. Marie: Nick Trbovich
- Scarborough: Paul Cosgrove (details)
- St. Catharines: Roy Adams
- Stoney Creek: Gordon Dean
- Stratford: Keith Culliton
- St. Thomas: Cliff Barwick
- Sudbury: Jim Gordon
- Thunder Bay: Walter Assef
- Timmins: Mike Doody
- Toronto: David Crombie (details)
- Trenton: Robert Patrick
- Valley East: Ray Plourd
- Vanier: Bernard Grandmaître
- Vaughan: Garnet Williams
- Waterloo: Herb Epp
- Welland: Allan Pietz
- Whitby: Jim Gartshore
- Windsor: Albert H. Weeks
- Woodstock: Leslie Cook
- Woolwich: Charlie Blow
- York: Philip White (details)
