= Mel Swart =

Canadian politician

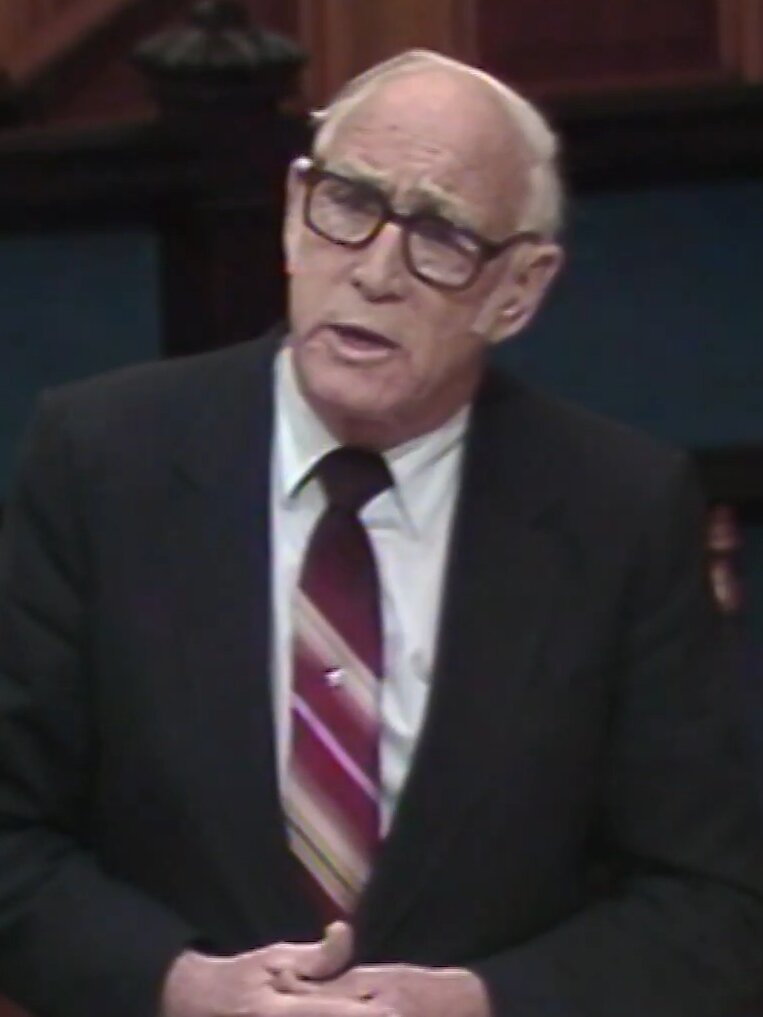
- Swart in 1986

Ontario MPP
- In office 1977–1988
- Preceded by: Constituency created
- Succeeded by: Peter Kormos
- Constituency: Welland—Thorold
- In office 1975–1977
- Preceded by: Ellis Morningstar
- Succeeded by: Constituency abolished
- Constituency: Welland

Personal details
- Born: June 25, 1919 London, Ontario, Canada
- Died: February 27, 2007 (aged 87) Thorold, Ontario, Canada
- Party: New Democratic

Melvin Leroy Swart (June 25, 1919 – February 27, 2007) was a Canadian politician in Ontario. He served in the Legislative Assembly of Ontario as a New Democratic MPP from 1975 to 1988.

== Background ==
Swart was born in London, Ontario. he went to school at Smithville Secondary School, and worked as a foreman. He served as an alderman in Thorold from 1948 to 1950, and was deputy reeve from 1951 to 1954 and reeve from 1955 to 1965. He became a warden for Welland County in 1961, and was president of the Association of Ontario Mayors and Reeves in 1961–62. He later served temporarily as its part-time executive director around 1970.

== Politics ==
Swart campaigned for the House of Commons of Canada five times, but was never successful. He was defeated in Welland as a candidate of the Cooperative Commonwealth Federation in a 1950 by-election, and in the general elections of 1953, 1957 and 1958.

He ran again for the federal New Democratic Party in the 1962 election, and was again defeated. On all five occasions, he finished third against his Progressive Conservative and Liberal opponents.

His provincial career was initially no more successful. He challenged Progressive Conservative incumbent Ellis Morningstar for the Welland provincial constituency in the 1967 election, but lost by 260 votes. He ran again in the 1971 election, and lost by a greater margin.

He had left the municipal council to concentrate on provincial politics, and stayed out of council until 1972, when he ran for Regional Councillor of Niagara Region and was elected, elected again in 1974. He served a two-year term as president of the New Democratic Party of Ontario beginning in 1974.

Morningstar retired at the 1975 election, and Swart was able to defeat his successor, Allan Pietz, by 1,115 votes. He defeated Pietz again for the newly created riding of Welland—Thorold in the 1977 election, and won by much greater margins in the elections of 1981, 1985 and 1987. He retired in 1988, and was replaced in the legislature by Peter Kormos, also of the NDP.

Two years after his retirement, the NDP won a majority government under Bob Rae. Despite having nominated Rae at the 1982 Ontario NDP leadership convention, Swart became highly critical of Rae's leadership in government, and blamed the Premier for falling NDP membership and financial contributions in the early 1990s.

Swart had been the leading advocate of public auto insurance in Ontario in the 1980s and was especially critical of the Rae government's decision to go back on its promise to introduce the program. In 1994, Swart publicly called on Rae to resign as NDP leader.

== Legacy ==
The Mel Swart Lake Gibson Conservation Area is in Thorold, Ontario. Swart was considered a political mentor to Peter Kormos who inherited both his predecessor's seat in the legislature and his strong advocacy of public auto insurance.

== Electoral record ==
1962 Canadian federal election: Welland
Party	Candidate	Votes	%	±%
Liberal	William Hector McMillan	17,614	47.6	+4.9
Progressive Conservative	Allan Pietz	12,209	33.0	-6.1
New Democratic	Mel Swart	6,225	16.8	-1.4
Social Credit	W.F. Trelford	630	1.7	
Communist	Frank Haslam	317	0.9	
Total valid votes		36,995	100.0	

Note: NDP vote is compared to CCF vote in 1958 election.

1958 Canadian federal election: Welland
Party	Candidate	Votes	%	±%
Liberal	William Hector McMillan	15,365	42.7	+0.3
Progressive Conservative	Allan Ernest Pietz	14,053	39.1	+5.1
Co-operative Commonwealth	Mel Swart	6,550	18.2	-5.4
Total valid votes		35,968	100.0	

1957 Canadian federal election: Welland
Party	Candidate	Votes	%	±%
Liberal	William Hector McMillan	13,241	42.4	-12.8
Progressive Conservative	William Bigelow Wellington	10,620	34.0	+7.6
Co-operative Commonwealth	Melvin L. Swart	7,356	23.6	+7.8
Total valid votes		31,217	100.0	

1953 Canadian federal election: Welland
Party	Candidate	Votes	%	±%
Liberal	William Hector McMillan	15,411	55.2	+6.5
Progressive Conservative	Clarence Lavern Robins	7,373	26.4	-6.0
Co-operative Commonwealth	Melvin L. Swart	4,408	15.8	+0.9
Labor–Progressive	Frank Haslam	721	2.6	-1.4
Total valid votes		27,913	100.0	

Canadian federal by-election, 16 October 1950: Welland
Party	Candidate	Votes	%	±%
On Mr. Mitchell's death, 1 August 1950
Liberal	William Hector McMillan	19,553	48.7	+1.4
Progressive Conservative	Sam Hughes	13,031	32.4	+6.0
Co-operative Commonwealth	Melvin L. Swart	5,972	14.9	-8.0
Labor–Progressive	Melbourne A. Doig	1,616	4.0	+0.6
Total valid votes		40,172	100.0	
