= Tirabassi =

Tirabassi is an Italian surname. Notable people with the surname include:

- Giorgio Tirabassi, Italian actor and director
- Tony Tirabassi, Canadian politician
- Brice Tirabassi, French rally driver
- Daniele Tirabassi, Venezuelan swimmer
