= William Alexander Thomson =

Canadian politician

William Alexander Thomson (November 1, 1816 – October 1, 1878) was a Canadian writer, railway promoter and political figure. He represented Welland in the House of Commons of Canada from 1872 to 1878 as a Liberal member.

He was born in Wigtownshire, Scotland and educated there. He emigrated to New York state before moving to Queenston, Upper Canada in 1834. He helped establish the Erie and Niagara Railway, later serving as its president. Thomson was an unsuccessful candidate for the Niagara federal seat, losing to Angus Morrison. He was elected in Welland in an 1872 by-election held after the death of Thomas Clark Street; he did not run in 1878 because of poor health and died later that year near Queenston.

Thomson published an economic treatise, An essay on production, money, and government; in which the principle of a natural law is advanced and explained, whereby credit, debt, taxation, tariffs, and interest on money will be abolished; and national debt and the current expenses of government will be paid in gold, in 1863.

1874 Canadian federal election: Welland
Party	Candidate	Votes	%	±%
Liberal	William Alexander Thomson	1,682	53.0	+2.0
Unknown	E.W. Brookfield	1,493	47.0	
Total valid votes		3,175	100.0	
Source: lop.parl.ca

Canadian federal by-election, 23 November 1872: Welland
Party	Candidate	Votes	%	±%
On Mr. Street's death, 6 August 1872
Liberal	William Alexander Thomson	1,539	51.0	
Unknown	Richard S. King	1,480	49.0	
Total valid votes		3,019	100.0	
