= Damude =

Damude is a surname. Notable people with the surname include:

- Arthur Damude (1889–1941), Canadian politician in Ontario
- Nicola Correia-Damude (born 1981), Canadian actress and singer
