= William Manley German =

Canadian politician

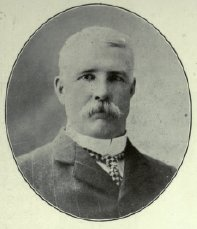

Member of the Canadian Parliament for Welland
- In office 1891–1892
- Preceded by: John Ferguson
- Succeeded by: James A. Lowell
- In office 1900–1917
- Preceded by: William McCleary
- Succeeded by: Evan Eugene Fraser
- In office 1921–1926
- Preceded by: Evan Eugene Fraser
- Succeeded by: George Hamilton Pettit

MLA for Welland
- In office June 26, 1894 – April 30, 1900
- Preceded by: William McCleary
- Succeeded by: John Franklin Gross

Personal details
- Born: May 25, 1851 Hillier Township, Prince Edward County, Canada West
- Died: March 31, 1933 (aged 81)
- Party: Liberal
- Other political affiliations: Ontario Liberal Party

William Manley German (May 25, 1851 – March 31, 1933) was an Ontario barrister and political figure. He represented Welland in the Legislative Assembly of Ontario from 1894 to 1900 and in the House of Commons of Canada from 1891 to 1892, from 1900 to 1917 and from 1921 to 1925 as a Liberal member.

He was born in Hillier Township, Prince Edward County, Canada West, the son of George German whose parents were United Empire Loyalists from New York state. He studied at Victoria College in Cobourg. German articled in law with Lewis Wallbridge in Belleville and then Edward Fitzgerald in Toronto. He was called to the bar in 1883 and set up practice in Welland. In 1885, he married Henrietta Aylmer Macdonald. German was deputy reeve for Welland in 1890. He was elected to the House of Commons in 1891 but unseated after an appeal. German resigned his seat in the provincial assembly in 1900 to sit in the federal parliament. He ran unsuccessfully in 1917 and 1926 for the Welland seat in the House of Commons.

German introduced legislation in the House of Commons to establish a bridge commission which led to the construction of the Peace Bridge between Fort Erie, Ontario and Buffalo, New York; similar legislation had been introduced in the United States Congress and the New York State Legislature. He was vice-president of the Buffalo and Fort Erie Public Bridge Company established to build the bridge.

1917 Canadian federal election: Welland
Party	Candidate	Votes	%
Government (Unionist)	Evan Eugene Fraser	5,378	46.0
Opposition (Laurier Liberals)	William Manly German	4,616	39.5
Labour	James Arthur Hughes	1,704	14.6
Total valid votes		11,698	100.0

1911 Canadian federal election: Welland
Party	Candidate	Votes
Liberal	William Manly German	acclaimed

1908 Canadian federal election: Welland
Party	Candidate	Votes	%	±%
Liberal	William Manly German	4,449	53.9	-3.6
Conservative	George Hanan	3,806	46.1	
Total valid votes		8,255	100.0	

1904 Canadian federal election: Welland
Party	Candidate	Votes	%	±%
Liberal	William Manly German	3,543	57.5	+5.4
Conservative	Walter Upper	2,621	42.5	
Total valid votes		6,164	100.0	

1900 Canadian federal election: Welland
Party	Candidate	Votes	%	±%
Liberal	William Manly German	2,777	52.1	+3.7
Conservative	William McCleary	2,557	47.9	-3.7
Total valid votes		5,334	100.0	
