= Mel Doig =

Canadian politician

Leader of the Communist Party of Canada (Ontario)
- Preceded by: William Stewart
- Succeeded by: Gordon Massie

Personal details
- Born: Melbourne A. Doig; 1912 British Columbia, Canada
- Died: October 25, 1998 (aged 85–86)
- Party: Communist Party of Canada
- Other political affiliations: Labor-Progressive Party
- Education: McGill University
- Occupation: Politician

Melbourne A. Doig (1912 – 25 October 1998) was a longtime Communist politician in Ontario, Canada. He served as leader of the Communist Party of Canada - Ontario in the 1981 provincial election, and was a prominent member of the federal party.

Doig was raised in a working-class community of Montreal, Quebec, and received a Bachelor of Arts degree from the McGill University in 1932. He also joined the Communist Party of Canada in the 1930s. He described himself as an organizer in he late 1940s. He was a Labor-Progressive Party candidate in Welland in the 1949 federal election and a 1950 federal by-election in the same riding. He finished fourth on both occasions.

Doig served on the Central Committee of the Communist Party of Canada in the early 1980s. An article in The Globe and Mail lists him as having been 68 years old in 1980.

The same article cites Doig as making the following comments in the 1980 federal election: "We are struggling to bring about a socialist society based on the interests of the majority of people who fight the exploitation of a minority. While we do see the possibility of achieving this end through the parliamentary process, we do not rule out the possibility of armed struggle if necessary . . . nor are we fighting for a socialist state and government that can be voted out of office through the ballot box."

Doig was a candidate in St. Catharines in the 1979 and 1984 federal elections and in the Toronto riding of St. Paul's in the 1980 federal election. He described himself as a journalist in 1979 and 1980 and as a secretary in 1984. Doig never came close to winning election.

During the 1981 provincial campaign, Doig called for a "new majority" of Members of Provincial Parliament who would end the foreign control of provincial industries. His party's platform called for the nationalization of natural resources, and government takeovers of plants that were in financial jeopardy. The Communist Party did not run a full slate of candidates. Doig proposed that MPPs belonging to the New Democratic Party (NDP) could become part of the "new majority" in the legislature. He received 162 votes in Dovercourt, finishing last against NDP candidate Tony Lupusella.

== Electoral record ==
1984 Canadian federal election: St. Catharines
Party	Candidate	Votes	%	±%
Progressive Conservative	Joe Reid	26,621	49.7	+11.8
New Democratic	Gerry Michaud	16,397	30.6	+4.2
Liberal	Linus Hand	9,890	18.5	-16.5
Green	Tom Ferguson	365	0.7	
Social Credit	Glen Hodgins	108	0.2	
Communist	Mel Doig	93	0.2	0.0
Commonwealth of Canada	Lancelot Mottley	56	0.1	
Total valid votes		53,530	100.0	

1981 Ontario general election: Dovercourt
Party	Candidate	Votes	%
New Democratic	Tony Lupusella	5,309	37.4
Liberal	Gil Gillespie	5,088	35.8
Progressive Conservative	Joe Burgana	3,386	23.8
Independent	Vince Comero	258	1.8
Communist	Mel Doig	164	1.2
Total valid votes		14,205	100.0

1980 Canadian federal election: St. Paul's
Party	Candidate	Votes	%	±%
Liberal	John Roberts	17,905	45.3	+4.0
Progressive Conservative	Ron Atkey	15,643	39.5	-4.6
New Democratic	James Lockyer	5,301	13.4	+0.1
Rhinoceros	Liza Armour	311	0.8	+0.5
Libertarian	Dan A. Kornitzer	162	0.4	-0.3
Independent	Robert Smith	108	0.3	
Communist	Mel Doig	76	0.2	0.0
Independent	Naomi Jolliffe	37	0.1	
Marxist–Leninist	Keith Ramdeen	22	0.1	0.0
Total valid votes		39,565	100.0	

1979 Canadian federal election: St. Catharines
Party	Candidate	Votes	%	±%
Progressive Conservative	Joe Reid	23,444	46.3	+12.6
Liberal	William Andres	14,990	29.6	-16.7
New Democratic	Peter J. Elliott	11,897	23.5	+4.7
Libertarian	Kenneth F. MacKay	186	0.4	
Communist	Melbourne Doig	111	0.2	0.0
Marxist–Leninist	Victoria A. Wiwcharyk	40	0.1	-0.1
Total valid votes		50,668	100.0	

Canadian federal by-election, 16 October 1950: Welland Death of Humphrey Mitchell
Party	Candidate	Votes	%	±%
Liberal	William Hector McMillan	19,553	48.7	+1.4
Progressive Conservative	Sam Hughes	13,031	32.4	+6.0
Co-operative Commonwealth	Melvin L. Swart	5,972	14.9	-8.0
Labor–Progressive	Melbourne A. Doig	1,616	4.0	+0.6
Total valid votes		40,172	100.0	

1949 Canadian federal election: Welland
Party	Candidate	Votes	%	±%
Liberal	Humphrey Mitchell	23,734	47.3	+3.7
Progressive Conservative	Sam Hughes	13,259	26.4	-6.3
Co-operative Commonwealth	Armour McCrae	11,493	22.9	+6.4
Labor–Progressive	Melbourne A. Doig	1,711	3.4	
Total valid votes		50,197	100.0	

== Notes ==
1. John Fraser, "Commitment to a cause, not votes, prompts these candidates to run", The Globe and Mail, 25 January 1980.
2. Stan Oziewicz, "Communists call for 'new majority' to break hold of U.S. companies", The Globe and Mail, 27 February 1981.
