= Victor Railton =

Canadian politician

Samuel Victor Railton

Member of Parliament for Welland
- In office October 1972 – March 1979
- Preceded by: Donald Tolmie
- Succeeded by: Gilbert Parent

Personal details
- Born: 28 February 1906 Kelvin, Ontario, Canada
- Died: 23 July 1996 (aged 90)
- Party: Liberal
- Profession: physician, surgeon

Samuel Victor Railton (28 February 1906 – 23 July 1996) was a Liberal party member of the House of Commons of Canada. He was born in Kelvin, Ontario and became a physician and surgeon by career.

Railton studied medicine at the University of Toronto after graduation from Brantford Collegiate Institute. After establishing a medical practice at Port Colborne, Ontario, he served in the Royal Canadian Army Medical Corps between 1940 and 1945. Following World War II, he became a surgeon in Welland, Ontario, and volunteered his skills in 1970 for the Nigerian Civil War.

He was first elected at the Welland riding in the 1972 general election and was re-elected there in the 1974 election. He left federal politics after completing his term in the 30th Parliament.

1974 Canadian federal election: Welland
Party	Candidate	Votes	%	±%
Liberal	Victor Railton	21,228	56.5	+7.2
Progressive Conservative	Alex McCrae	9,107	24.2	-7.3
New Democratic	Jim McPherson	6,983	18.6	-0.5
Communist	John Severinsky	238	0.6	
Total valid votes		37,556	100.0	

1972 Canadian federal election: Welland
Party	Candidate	Votes	%	±%
Liberal	Victor Railton	18,693	49.3	-0.5
Progressive Conservative	Kent Hodgson	11,977	31.6	+14.0
New Democratic	Ronald Cook	7,256	19.1	-13.5
Total valid votes		37,926	100.0	
