= Donald Tolmie =

Canadian politician

Donald Ross Tolmie
- Official 1968 portrait

Alderman of Welland, Ontario
- In office 1957–1964

Member of Parliament for Welland
- In office November 1965 – September 1972
- Preceded by: Victor Railton
- Succeeded by: William Hector McMillan

Personal details
- Born: 11 November 1923 Lindsay, Ontario
- Died: 18 March 2009 (aged 85) Pelham, Ontario
- Party: Liberal
- Profession: lawyer

Donald Ross Tolmie (11 November 1923 – 18 March 2009) was a Liberal party member of the House of Commons of Canada.

== Biography ==
Tolmie was born in Lindsay, Ontario and served in World War II as an Avro Lancaster navigator. He became a lawyer in Welland, Ontario where he was an alderman from 1957 to 1964. After this, he entered federal politics winning a seat at the Welland riding in the 1965 general election. Tolmie was re-elected there in 1968, then left federal politics in 1972 after completing his term in the 28th Canadian Parliament.

From October 1971 to September 1972, Tolmie was Parliamentary Secretary to Ron Basford, the Minister of Consumer and Corporate Affairs at that time.

After an undisclosed illness, Tolmie died at his home in Pelham, Ontario on 18 March 2009.

1968 Canadian federal election: Welland
Party	Candidate	Votes	%	±%
Liberal	Donald R. Tolmie	17,335	49.8	-0.5
New Democratic	Robert Wright	11,363	32.6	+6.7
Progressive Conservative	Franklin Bud Law	6,129	17.6	-6.3
Total valid votes		34,827	100.0	

1965 Canadian federal election: Welland
Party	Candidate	Votes	%	±%
Liberal	Donald R. Tolmie	17,869	50.2	-5.0
New Democratic	Robert Wright	9,206	25.9	+12.0
Progressive Conservative	T.G. Spencer	8,496	23.9	
Total valid votes		35,571	100.0	
