= Jane Bigelow =

Canadian politician (1928–2021)

Jane Elizabeth Bigelow (née Dillon; June 9, 1928 – June 1, 2021) was a politician in Ontario, Canada. She was the first female mayor of London, Ontario, serving from 1972 to 1978.

Born Jane Elizabeth Dillon, the daughter of Edward and Margaret Dillon, she grew up in Toronto and was educated at St. Clement's School and at the University of Toronto, where she completed a degree in physical education. In 1954, she married Charlie Bigelow. The couple lived in Hamilton, Edmonton, Ottawa, New York and Copenhagen before settling in London in 1965. She served on the London Board of Control in the 1960s. Bigelow became mayor, in 1972, after James Frederick Gosnell resigned as mayor for health reasons. She died of complications of a fall on June 1, 2021.
