= William McCleary =

Canadian politician

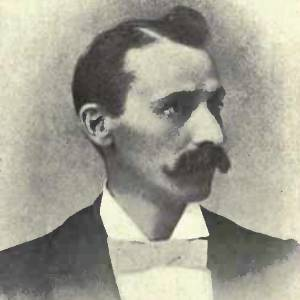
William McCleary

William McCleary (5 November 1853 – 22 May 1917) was a Canadian merchant and politician who represented Welland in the Legislative Assembly of Ontario as a Conservative member from 1890 to 1894 and in the House of Commons of Canada from 1896 to 1900 as a Conservative member.

== Life ==
He was born in Thorold, Canada West in 1853, the son of Beatty McCleary and Matilda McCabe, both Irish immigrants, and was educated there and at Toronto. In 1877, McCleary married Jennie E. Ewart.

He was a lumber merchant at Thorold, a partner in a company which operated saw and planing mills there, and also served as reeve and mayor of the town. McCleary was also warden for Welland County.

He was defeated in the 1894 provincial election, then was elected to the federal parliament in 1896 but was unsuccessful in a bid for reelection in 1900. McCleary was a member of the Thorold Board of Trade and a prominent member in the local chapter of the Ancient Order of United Workmen. He was also a member of the local Orange Lodge and of the Freemasons.

== Electoral results ==
1900 Canadian federal election: Welland
Party	Candidate	Votes	%	±%
Liberal	William Manly German	2,777	52.1	+3.7
Conservative	William McCleary	2,557	47.9	-3.7
Total valid votes		5,334	100.0	

1896 Canadian federal election: Welland
Party	Candidate	Votes	%	±%
Conservative	William McCleary	2,705	51.6	+6.1
Liberal	James A. Lowell	2,536	48.4	-6.1
Total valid votes		5,241	100.0	

Note: popular vote is compared to redsult in 1891 general election.
