= George Hamilton Pettit =

Canadian politician

Member of Parliament for Welland
- In office October 1925 – 1935
- Preceded by: William Manley German
- Succeeded by: Arthur Damude

Personal details
- Born: George Hamilton Pettit; 10 August 1872 Richmond, Ontario, Canada
- Died: 5 June 1953 (aged 80)
- Party: Conservative
- Spouse(s): Grace Evelyn Ghent m. 3 October 1899
- Profession: barrister

George Hamilton Pettit (10 August 1872 – 5 June 1953) was a Canadian politician and barrister. Pettit served as a Conservative member of the House of Commons of Canada. He was born in Richmond, Ontario.

Pettit attended public and secondary schools at Cornwall, Ontario. He then studied at Osgoode Hall Law School where he graduated in 1894. He became president of the Welland County Telephone Company. From May to October 1913, he was a deputy and acting court judge at Welland County.

He was first elected to Parliament at the Welland riding in the 1925 general election then re-elected in 1926 and 1930. After completing his third term in office, Pettit left federal politics and did not seek another term in the 1935 federal election.

1930 Canadian federal election: Welland
| Party | Candidate | Votes | % | ±% |
|---|---|---|---|---|
| Conservative | George Hamilton Pettit | 15,503 | 54.3 | +1.7 |
| Liberal | Arthur Byron Damude | 13,037 | 45.7 | -1.7 |
| Total valid votes | | 28,540 | 100.0 | |
Source: lop.parl.ca

1926 Canadian federal election: Welland
| Party | Candidate | Votes | % | ±% |
|---|---|---|---|---|
| Conservative | George Hamilton Pettit | 14,331 | 52.6 | -7.7 |
| Liberal | William Manly German | 12,890 | 47.4 | +7.7 |
| Total valid votes | | 27,221 | 100.0 | |

1925 Canadian federal election: Welland
| Party | Candidate | Votes | % | ±% |
|---|---|---|---|---|
| Conservative | George Hamilton Pettit | 12,753 | 60.4 | +30.3 |
| Liberal | Harry Punshon Stephens | 8,373 | 39.6 | -13.3 |
| Total valid votes | | 21,126 | 100.0 | |
