= John David Maloney =

Canadian politician

Mayor of Port Colborne
- In office December 1, 2014 – November 30, 2018
- Preceded by: Vance Badawey
- Succeeded by: Bill Steele

Member of Parliament for Welland (Erie—Lincoln; 1997–2004) (Erie; 1993–1997)
- In office October 25, 1993 – October 14, 2008
- Preceded by: Girve Fretz
- Succeeded by: Malcolm Allen

Personal details
- Born: January 5, 1945 (age 81) Welland, Ontario, Canada
- Party: Liberal
- Spouse: Sherrie Maloney
- Profession: Lawyer

John David Maloney (born January 5, 1945) is a Canadian politician. He was a member of the House of Commons of Canada 1993 to 2008, and represented the riding of Welland and its antecedents for the Liberal Party, and subsequently served as mayor of Port Colborne from 2014 to 2018.

Maloney has a Bachelor of Arts degree and a Diploma in Criminology from the University of Toronto, as well as a law degree from Osgoode Hall. He practiced law before entering political life. Maloney worked for the firm of Smith, Shaver, Selzer & McLuskie from 1972 to 1974, operated a private practice in Port Colborne from 1974 to 1976, and has been a partner in Maloney and Maloney from 1976 to the present. In 1980, he was named Port Colborne Citizen of the Year. He received a Queen's Jubilee Medal in 2002.

He was first elected to parliament in the 1993 federal election, winning a convincing victory over his Reform and Progressive Conservative opponents in the riding of Erie. He was re-elected by narrower margins in the elections of 1997 and 2000, in the redistributed riding of Erie—Lincoln. On the latter occasion, he defeated Canadian Alliance candidate and future MP Dean Allison by just over 2,000 votes.

After further redistribution in 2004, Maloney defeated Greg D'Amico and fellow Liberal MP Tony Tirabassi for the party's nomination in Welland. He defeated New Democratic Party candidate Jody Di Bartolomeo and Conservative Mel Grunstein in the election which followed. In the 2006 federal election, he once again defeated Bartolomeo and Grunstein and was returned to office by the voters of Welland.

Maloney served as parliamentary secretary to Canada's Attorney General from 1999 to 2001.

He was defeated in the 2008 federal election, finishing third against New Democratic Party candidate Malcolm Allen. In early 2009, Maloney was again acclaimed as the Liberal Party candidate for the next federal election, held May 2, 2011. Maloney again lost to incumbent, Malcolm Allen.

In April 2014, Maloney announced his filing to run for the office of Mayor of Port Colborne in the 2014 municipal elections. Maloney went on to win the mayoral race in October 2014, with 3,991 (57.5%) votes over candidates Fred Davies at 2,258 votes (32.5%), and Mike Sloat at 693 votes (10%).

He did not seek re-election in the 2018 municipal elections.

== Electoral record ==
2008 Canadian federal election
Party	Candidate	Votes
New Democratic	Malcolm Allen	16,842
Conservative	Alf Kiers	16,542
Liberal	John Maloney	14,295
Green	Jennifer Mooradian	2,816
Independent	Jody Di Bartolomeo	569
Marxist–Leninist	Ron Walker	114

2006 Canadian federal election
Party	Candidate	Votes
Liberal	John Maloney	20,238
New Democratic	Jody Di Bartolomeo	17,484
Conservative	Mel Grunstein	16,665
Green	Brian Simpson	1,960
Christian Heritage	Irma D. Ruiter	536

2004 Canadian federal election
Party	Candidate	Votes
Liberal	John Maloney	19,642
New Democratic	Jody Di Bartolomeo	14,623
Conservative	Mel Grunstein	12,997
Green	Ryan McLaughlin	1,454
Christian Heritage	Irma D. Ruiter	735
Marxist–Leninist	Ron Walker	113

2000 Canadian federal election
Party	Candidate	Votes
Liberal	MALONEY, John	17,054
Alliance	ALLISON, Dean	14,992
Progressive Conservative	HURREN, David	5,174
New Democratic	DI BARTOLOMEO, Jody	2,423
Not affiliated	BYLSMA, David W.	476
Natural Law	GREGORY, John	143
Canadian Action	SCHLEICH, William	137

1997 Canadian federal election
Party	Candidate	Votes
Liberal	MALONEY, John	17,542
Reform	MACINNIS, Jim	12,788
Progressive Conservative	CLARE, Gord	6,317
New Democratic	HANRATH, Willem	2,509
Christian Heritage	KIERS, Alfred	1,301
Canadian Action	SCHLEICH, William	267
Natural Law	LARRASS, Margaret	228

1993 Canadian federal election
Party	Candidate	Votes
Liberal	MALONEY, John	19,799
Reform	LUND, Bob	11,753
Progressive Conservative	WILSON, Bradd	5,894
New Democratic	PENWARDEN, Lesley	1,842
Christian Heritage	KIERS, Alfred	591
National	ROBBINS, Bill	586
Natural Law	DREBEN, Jeffrey Ian	197
