= Fred Davies (politician) =

Canadian politician

Fred Davies MP

Member of Parliament for Niagara South
- Incumbent
- Assumed office April 28, 2025
- Preceded by: Vance Badawey

Personal details
- Party: Conservative

Fred Davies MP is a Canadian politician from the Conservative Party of Canada. He was elected Member of Parliament for Niagara South in the 2025 Canadian federal election. He served as a School Board Trustee and was a Niagara Regional Councillor, representing Port Colborne.

== Early life and background ==
Fred Davies was born and raised in Port Colborne, Ontario. He studied at Brock University and later earned a Master of Business Administration from the University of Cumbria in the United Kingdom.

Davies began his professional career in Ottawa, working as a legislative assistant and executive assistant in the House of Commons. He later returned to Port Colborne, where he helped establish the city's first economic development officer position. Over time, he became involved in a range of local initiatives and community organizations.

He has founded and managed manufacturing businesses in Welland and St. Catharines and currently serves as President and CEO of the Niagara Business & Innovation Fund (NBIF), which provides support for start-ups in Southwestern Ontario through angel investment. In this capacity, he has worked with a number of local businesses to help them grow.

Davies and his wife Monica have also co-founded several food and beverage businesses in Port Colborne, including San Marco’s Ristorante and the Breakwall Brewing Company.

== Political career ==
Davies was elected twice as a Trustee with the former Niagara South Board of Education and the District School Board of Niagara. He has served on the boards of the Niagara Health System Foundation, Pathstone Mental Health, and Bridges Community Health. He was also the Charter President of the Rotary Club of Port Colborne and received a Paul Harris Fellowship.

In the 2022 municipal election, Davies was acclaimed Regional Councillor for Port Colborne. His campaign addressed issues such as increasing housing development and improving access to affordable housing.

That same year, he ran as the Progressive Conservative Party of Ontario candidate in the 2022 Ontario general election for Niagara Centre, placing second behind New Democratic Party incumbent Jeff Burch by fewer than 1,000 votes.

In the 2025 Canadian federal election, Davies ran as the Conservative Party of Canada candidate in Niagara South and defeated long-time Liberal incumbent Vance Badawey, receiving 47.8% of the vote compared to Badawey’s 43.9%. His win marked the first Conservative victory in the riding since the 1980s.

At the time of the 2025 Canadian federal election, he lived in Welland, Ontario.

== Electoral record ==
2025 Canadian federal election: Niagara South
** Preliminary results — Not yet official **
Party	Candidate	Votes	%	±%	Expenditures
Conservative	Fred Davies	36,702	47.81	+14.40	
Liberal	Vance Badawey	33,708	43.91	+10.95	
New Democratic	Chantal McCollum	4,307	5.61	–17.18	
People's	Peter Taras	1,147	1.49	–7.46	
Green	Natashia Bergen	683	0.89	–1.01	
Christian Heritage	David Vedova	215	0.28	N/A	
Total valid votes/expense limit					
Total rejected ballots					
Turnout		76,762	67.86		
Eligible voters		113,111			
Conservative notional hold		Swing		+1.73	
Source: Elections Canada

2022 Ontario general election: Niagara Centre
Party	Candidate	Votes	%	±%	Expenditures
New Democratic	Jeff Burch	16,360	39.70	–4.53	$98,721
Progressive Conservative	Fred Davies	15,506	37.63	+0.12	$60,037
Liberal	Terry Flynn	5,492	13.33	+1.50	$12,584
Green	Michelle McArthur	1,865	4.53	+0.84	$6
New Blue	Gary Dumelie	1,148	2.79	N/A	$1,586
Ontario Party	Vincent Gircys	837	2.03	N/A	$0
Total valid votes/expense limit		41,208	99.53	+0.90	$133,643
Total rejected, unmarked, and declined ballots		194	0.47	–0.90	
Turnout		41,402	43.37	–12.76	
Eligible voters		95,459			
New Democratic hold		Swing		–2.32	
Source(s): "Summary of Valid Votes Cast for Each Candidate" (PDF). Elections Ontario. 2022. Archived from the original on 2023-05-18.; "Statistical Summary by Electoral District" (PDF). Elections Ontario. 2022. Archived from the original on 2023-05-21.; "Political Financing and Party Information". Elections Ontario.
