= John Ferguson (Ontario politician) =

Canadian politician

John Ferguson (April 27, 1839 – September 22, 1896) was a Canadian politician, physician, contractor and farmer. He represented Welland in the House of Commons of Canada from 1882 to 1891 as a Conservative member. He then served as a member of the Senate of Canada from 1892 to 1896.

== Life ==
He was born in Middlesex County, Upper Canada, the son of John Ferguson, and was educated in London. Ferguson received a M.D. from Victoria College in Toronto in 1864. Ferguson continued his studies at Bellevue Hospital in New York City. After his return to Canada, he practised for four years and then entered business as a contractor for public works. Ferguson worked on the construction of the New York and Oswego Midland Railway, the Galt and Berlin Railway, the Welland Canal and the water works for Toronto. He was also responsible for the operation of water works in Toronto and St. Catharines. With H.C. Symmes, he built a pulp mill at Sherbrooke, Quebec. In 1869, Ferguson married a Miss Robinson from Galt. He served as coroner for Middlesex County. He owned a fruit farm on the banks of the Niagara River. Ferguson was defeated when he ran for reelection in 1891. He died in office at the age of 57.

== Electoral history ==
1891 Canadian federal election: Welland
Party	Candidate	Votes	%	±%
Liberal	William M. German	2,726	54.5	
Conservative	John Ferguson	2,279	45.5	-6.6
Total valid votes		5,005	100.0	

1887 Canadian federal election: Welland
Party	Candidate	Votes	%	±%
Conservative	John Ferguson	2,622	52.1	+0.4
Unknown	Thos. Conlon	2,410	47.9	
Total valid votes		5,032	100.0	

1882 Canadian federal election: Welland
Party	Candidate	Votes	%	±%
Conservative	John Ferguson	1,965	51.7	+0.2
Unknown	B.B. Osler	1,833	48.3	
Total valid votes		3,798	100.0	
