= Evan Eugene Fraser =

Canadian politician

Evan Eugene Fraser (March 15, 1865 – August 4, 1949) was an Ontario contractor and political figure. He represented the provincial riding of Welland in the Legislative Assembly of Ontario from 1905 to 1914 as a Conservative member; and the federal riding of Welland in the House of Commons of Canada from 1918 to 1921 as a Unionist member.

The son of Alexander Fraser and Phoebe Upper, he was born in Allanburg, Canada West in 1865. and was educated in Thorold. In 1887, Fraser married Susie Hardie.

1921 Canadian federal election: Welland
Party	Candidate	Votes	%	±%
Liberal	William Manly German	11,195	52.9	+13.5
Conservative	Evan Eugene Fraser	6,365	30.1	-15.9
Progressive	Joseph Henry Staley	3,437	16.2	
Independent	Henry Speakman	156	0.7	
Total valid votes		21,153	100.0	

Note: Conservative vote is compared to Government vote in 1917 election, and Liberal vote is compared to Opposition vote.

1917 Canadian federal election: Welland
Party	Candidate	Votes	%
Government (Unionist)	Evan Eugene Fraser	5,378	46.0
Opposition (Laurier Liberals)	William Manly German	4,616	39.5
Labour	James Arthur Hughes	1,704	14.6
Total valid votes		11,698	100.0
