= Malcolm Allen (politician) =

Canadian politician (born 1953)

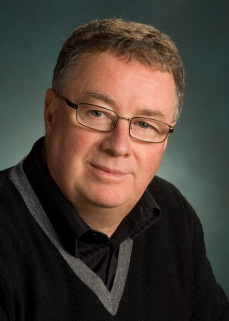
- Official portrait, 2011

Member of Parliament for Welland
- In office October 14, 2008 – October 19, 2015
- Preceded by: John Maloney
- Succeeded by: Vance Badawey (Niagara Centre)

Personal details
- Born: May 30, 1953 (age 73) Glasgow, Scotland
- Party: New Democratic
- Spouse: Peggy Allen
- Profession: Politician; electrician

Malcolm Allen (born May 30, 1953) is a Canadian politician. He represented the riding of Welland in the House of Commons of Canada from 2008 to 2015 as a member of the New Democratic Party. He served as Critic for Agriculture and Agri-Food in the Shadow Cabinet of the Official Opposition (Canada).

== Early life and career ==
Allen was born in Glasgow, Scotland and immigrated to Canada as a child in 1963. His father, a shipwright came over to Canada to work at the Collingwood shipyards. He would later to transfer to the Port Weller Dry Docks located on the Welland Canal where Allen's family would settle.

Allen holds an undergraduate degree in history and political science from Brock University (graduated in 1983). An electrician by trade, he served on the Executive Board of CAW local 199 from 1996 to 2000 as Recording Secretary and from 2000 to 2008 as Financial Secretary.

In 2004, Allen travelled to Africa to oversee the clearing of landmine sites and the construction of women's co-ops as part of the Canadian Autoworkers, Canada Social Justice Fund committee.

In 2007 Allen spearheaded the creation of Genesis Court, a non-profit affordable housing complex with support services that would help people who were at risk to turn their lives around. Through the planning stages of Genesis court it would eventually become part of the Bethlehem Housing and Support Services organization, which includes Bethlehem Place.

Allen was also a member of the Pelham Library Board, the Golden Horseshoe Social Action Committee and the Niagara Health Coalition.

== Pelham municipal politics ==
Allen served on the Pelham Town Council from 2003 to 2008 representing Ward 1.

In 2006, he served as the town's deputy mayor. He also chaired the Municipal Corporate Services Committee and served on it for five years.

== Member of Parliament ==
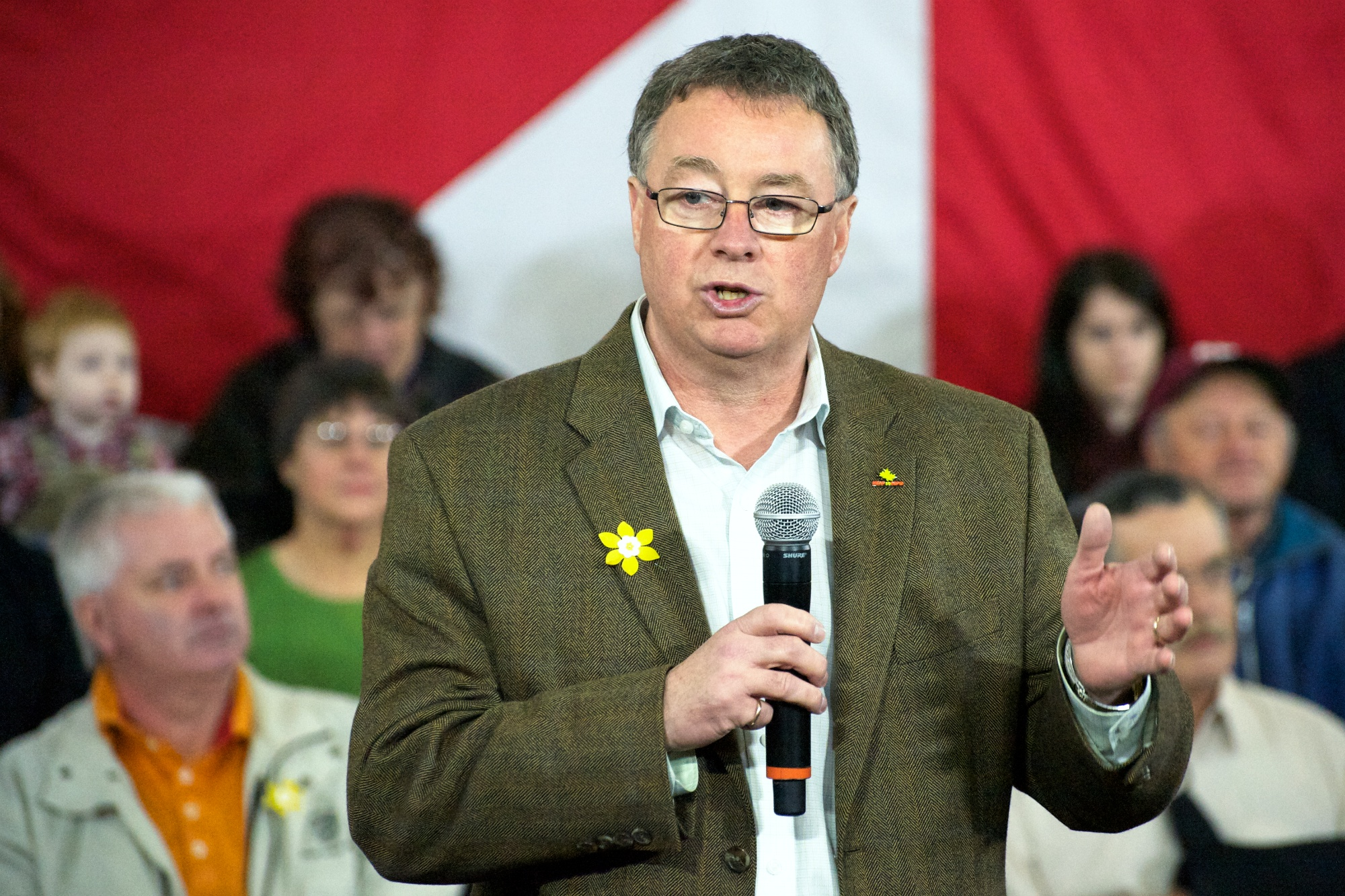
Allen during the 2011 federal election

Allen was first elected to the House of Commons on October 14, 2008 to the 40th Parliament, defeating Conservative Alf Kiers and the Liberal incumbent, John Maloney.

During the 40th Parliament Allen served as the critic for Skills, Training and Apprenticeships and Food Safety and the deputy critic for Agriculture and Food Security (Canadian Food Inspection Agency). He also served for a period as New Democrat Caucus chair.

Allen was re-elected on May 2, 2011, beating Conservative Leanna Villella by over 1000 votes. Allen was one of 103 New Democrats elected, a record for the party and the first time in their history serving as the Official Opposition. Allen was the Critic for Agriculture and Agri-Food in Thomas Mulcair's Official Opposition Shadow Cabinet.

On October 19, 2015, Allen lost his seat to Liberal candidate Vance Badawey.

Allen ran in the 2019 federal election in Niagara Centre, where he placed third, with 26.69% of the vote. He ran in the 2021 federal election in Hamilton Mountain, placing second with 32.4% of the vote.

=== Poppy Bill ===
In November 2009, Allen introduced a private members bill intended to support the Royal Canadian Legion's annual Poppy Campaign by eliminating the GST from the purchase of poppies and poppy wreaths. The taxing of poppies was estimated to cost Legions about $780,000 a year. The money raised by the legions in the Poppy Campaign is used for important services like dental care, replacing broken roofs, supporting meals-on-wheels programs and more. After almost a full year of pressure, both the Provincial Liberal Government and Federal Conservative Government finally agreed to remove each of their portions of the new HST (formerly PST and GST) from the poppy purchases. Canada's Legions now have approximately $780,000 more a year to operate their services.

=== Opposition to Homolka pardon ===
In May 2010, Allen met with Talin French-Doyle, niece of Kristen French who presented him with a petition containing over 1,700 signatures asking for the government to create legislation to prevent Karla Homolka, who was involved in French's murder, from receiving a pardon. Under the law at the time, Homolka would have been eligible to apply for a pardon in the summer of 2010.

Allen introduced a Private Member's Bill that would have effectively fast tracked the portion of Bill C-23 (An Act to Amend The Criminal Records Act). This would have prevented the pardon, and allowed for proper debate of the remaining portion of the bill. When there was hesitation of the Government and Official Opposition sides to go through with Allen's Private Members Bill, he immediately offered it to the government to ensure that the right thing was done. It is because of this pressure that Allen was able to successfully negotiate a deal with Conservative Public Safety Minister Vic Toews to split the Bill C-23 into two bills and was able to fast-track the new Bill C-23a which barred Homolka from receiving a pardon. The bill was passed on the final sitting day of the House of Commons 2010 Winter Session, and Homolka did not receive a pardon.

== Electoral record ==
2021 Canadian federal election: Hamilton Mountain
Party	Candidate	Votes	%	±%	Expenditures
Liberal	Lisa Hepfner	16,547	34.1	+3.8	$53,627.84
New Democratic	Malcolm Allen	15,712	32.4	-3.7	$93,599.93
Conservative	Al Miles	11,838	24.4	-1.1	$50,535.87
People's	Chelsey Taylor	3,097	6.4	+5.0	$0.00
Green	Dave Urquhart	974	2.0	-3.9	$0.00
Christian Heritage	Jim Enos	336	0.7	+0.1	$500.00
Total valid votes		48,460	99.1		
Total rejected ballots		419	0.9		
Turnout		48,879	60.6		
Eligible voters		80,647			
Liberal gain from New Democratic		Swing		+3.8	
Source: Elections Canada

2019 Canadian federal election: Niagara Centre
Party	Candidate	Votes	%	±%	Expenditures
Liberal	Vance Badawey	20,292	35.01	-0.68	$78,098.76
Conservative	April Jeffs	17,987	31.03	+1.32	none listed
New Democratic	Malcolm Allen	15,469	26.69	-4.80	none listed
Green	Michael Tomaino	3,054	5.27	+2.86	$2,561.88
People's	Andrew Sainz-Nieto	776	1.34		none listed
Christian Heritage	Nic Bylsma	308	0.53		none listed
Marxist–Leninist	Robert Walker	77	0.13	-0.04	none listed
Total valid votes/expense limit		57,963	99.08		
Total rejected ballots		539	0.92	+0.33	
Turnout		58,502	64.31	-1.33	
Eligible voters		90,698			
Liberal hold		Swing		-1.00	
Source: Elections Canada

2015 Canadian federal election
Party	Candidate	Votes
Liberal	Vance Badawey	19,432
New Democratic	Malcolm Allen	17,103
Conservative	Leanna Villella	16,157
Green	David Clow	1,314
Animal Alliance	Jody Di Bartolomeo	297
Marxist–Leninist	Ron J. Walker	97

2011 Canadian federal election
Party	Candidate	Votes
New Democratic	Malcolm Allen	21,917
Conservative	Leanna Villella	20,895
Liberal	John Maloney	7,276
Green	Robin Williamson	1,297
Christian Heritage	David Vangoolen	299
Independent	Ray Game	169
Marxist–Leninist	Ron Walker	71

2008 Canadian federal election
Party	Candidate	Votes
New Democratic	Malcolm Allen	16,842
Conservative	Alf Kiers	16,542
Liberal	John Maloney	14,295
Green	Jennifer Mooradian	2,816
Independent	Jody Di Bartolomeo	569
Marxist–Leninist	Ron Walker	114
