= James Frederick Gosnell =

James Fredrick Gosnell (c. 1918–1986) commonly called "Fred" was a mayor of London, Ontario, Canada from January 1, 1972 to March 6, 1972. His son Tom Gosnell was the mayor of London from 1986 to 1994 and was later the deputy mayor and budget chief from 2003 to 2010. Art Cartier recalled Gosnell as taking a businesslike approach to politics. "He was not the smooth, glad-handing type and he related things as if he were running his own business." Former alderman Andy Grant said that although he and Gosnell had differing political philosophies and differences of opinion "we did not hold it against each other. He was a fine guy, very likable and very fair."

== Beginning years ==
Gosnell was born in the Kent County community of Highgate and moved to London in his late teens. He joined the London police force as a constable in 1938, then saw action in India and Burma while serving with the Royal Canadian Air Force during the Second World War. He was a former member of the "Elephant Transport Squadron" No. 436 Squadron RCAF of the Royal Canadian Air Force. During his time in the 436 Squadron he ran a business taking photographs which he later used to make a collection which he sold by subscription to his colleagues. A sample of his collection can by seen on the Canadian Letters Project website under the entry for Joseph Lorne Moore who was also in 436 Squadron: https://www.canadianletters.ca/collections/war/469/collection/20473/doc/223

After the war, Gosnell started and sold a driving school, a golf range and an Amway products distributorship.

== Alderman ==
Gosnell entered municipal politics in 1966 as a council candidate in Ward 6. He told voters that he had no intention of offering a "batch of ridiculous promises. For me to do so would be nothing more than an insult to your intelligence and my integrity." His no nonsense appeal worked as he was elected that year as alderman on his first try.

== Board of Control ==
Gosnell made the jump to board of control in 1968, taking advantage of a vacancy created by the resignation of long-time controller Norman Bradford.

Four people sought the vacant controller's post and Gosnell emerged as winner in a city council vote criticized by press reports of the day because it was held in secret.

== Mayoralty ==
After three years on the board of control, he was ready to run for mayor and beat out incumbent Herb McClure by 2,263 votes. Gosnell campaigned on the theme "let's get London going again." He campaigned on a pledge to bring new leadership to city hall but had little chance to put his goals into action. His mayoral term was only 3 months and 6 days having to resign after a serious heart attack in early February. His doctors had advised him to slow down and he did, deciding against a return to politics despite rumors in the fall of 1973 that he might run for board of control.

== Family ==
Gosnell was married to the former Evelyn Head, and had three sons, James Frederick, Thomas Charles, and William Douglas, and one daughter, Pamela Jane.
