= Erie—Lincoln (federal electoral district) =

Former federal electoral district in Ontario, Canada

Ontario electoral district

Defunct federal electoral district
- Legislature: House of Commons
- District created: 1996
- District abolished: 2003
- First contested: 1997
- Last contested: 2000

Demographics
- Population (2001): 98,312
- Electors (2002): 66,436
- Area (km²): 1,477
- Census division(s): Haldimand, Niagara
- Census subdivision(s): Dunnville, Fort Erie, Wainfleet, Ontario, Port Colborne, West Lincoln, Lincoln

Erie—Lincoln was a federal electoral district in Ontario, Canada, that was represented in the House of Commons of Canada from 1997 to 2004, and was a provincial electoral district represented in the Legislative Assembly of Ontario from 1999 to 2007. This riding was created in 1996 from parts of Erie, Haldimand—Norfolk and Lincoln ridings.

It consisted of the City of Port Colborne, the towns of Fort Erie and Lincoln and the townships of Wainfleet and West Lincoln in the Regional Municipality of Niagara, and the Town of Dunnville in the Regional Municipality of Haldimand-Norfolk.

The electoral district was abolished in 2003 when it was redistributed between Haldimand—Norfolk, Niagara Falls, Niagara West—Glanbrook, and Welland ridings. It was replaced as a provincial riding in the 2007 provincial election by the new federal riding boundaries.

== Members of Parliament ==
The riding has elected the following members of Parliament:

Parliament	Years	Member	Party
Erie—Lincoln; Riding created from Erie, Lincoln and Haldimand—Norfolk
36th	1997–2000	John David Maloney	Liberal
37th	2000–2004	John David Maloney	Liberal
Riding dissolved into Niagara West—Glanbrook, Niagara Falls, Welland and Haldimand—Norfolk

== Election results ==
2000 Canadian federal election
Party	Candidate	Votes	%	±%
Liberal	John Maloney	17,054	42.2%	
Alliance	Dean Allison	14,992	37.1%	
Progressive Conservative	David Hurren	5,174	12.8%	
New Democratic	Jody Di Bartolomeo	2,423	5.9%	
Independent	David W. Bylsma	476	1.1%	
Natural Law	John Gregory	143	0.3%	
Canadian Action	William Schleich	137	0.3%	
Total		40,399		

1997 Canadian federal election
Party	Candidate	Votes	%	±%
Liberal	John Maloney	17,542	42.8%	
Reform	Jim MacInnis	12,788	31.2%	
Progressive Conservative	Gord Clare	6,317	15.4%	
New Democratic	Willem Hanrath	2,509	6.1%	
Christian Heritage	Alfred Kiers	1,301	3.1%	
Canadian Action	William Schleich	267	0.6%	
Natural Law	Margaret Larrass	228	0.5%	
Total		40,952		

== See also ==
- List of Canadian electoral districts
- Historical federal electoral districts of Canada
