= Welland—St. Catharines—Thorold =

Former federal electoral district in Ontario, Canada

Ontario electoral district

Defunct federal electoral district
- Legislature: House of Commons
- District created: 1987
- District abolished: 1996
- First contested: 1988
- Last contested: 1993

Welland—St. Catharines—Thorold was a federal electoral district represented in the House of Commons of Canada from 1988 to 1997. It was located in the province of Ontario. This riding was created in 1987 from Welland riding.

Welland—St. Catharines—Thorold consisted of the southern part of the City of St. Catharines, the City of Thorold and the northern part of the city of Welland.

The electoral district was abolished in 1996 when it was re-distributed between Niagara Centre, Niagara Falls, and St. Catharines ridings.

== Members of Parliament ==
This riding has elected the following members of Parliament:

Parliament	Years	Member	Party
Riding created from Welland
34th	1988–1993	Gilbert Parent	Liberal
35th	1993–1997	Gilbert Parent	Liberal
Riding dissolved into Niagara Centre, Niagara Falls and St. Catharines

== Election results ==
1988 Canadian federal election
Party	Candidate	Votes
Liberal	Gilbert Parent	17,878
Progressive Conservative	Allan Pietz	16,287
New Democratic	Ken Lee	12,646
Green	Rachel Thomson	273
No affiliation	Ron Walker	71
Communist	David Wallis	57

1993 Canadian federal election
Party	Candidate	Votes	%
Liberal	Gilbert Parent	25,534	53.97%
Reform	Don Johnstone	11,901	25.15%
Progressive Conservative	Terry St. Amand	5,472	11.56%
New Democratic	Rob Dobrucki	3,737	7.89%
Natural Law	Laureen Amos	311	0.66%
Green	Jim Fannon	304	0.64%
Abolitionist	Leonard Doucet	64	0.14%

== See also ==
- List of Canadian electoral districts
- Historical federal electoral districts of Canada
