= Niagara West—Glanbrook =

Former federal electoral district in Ontario, Canada

Coordinates: 43.115°N 79.575°W

Ontario electoral district
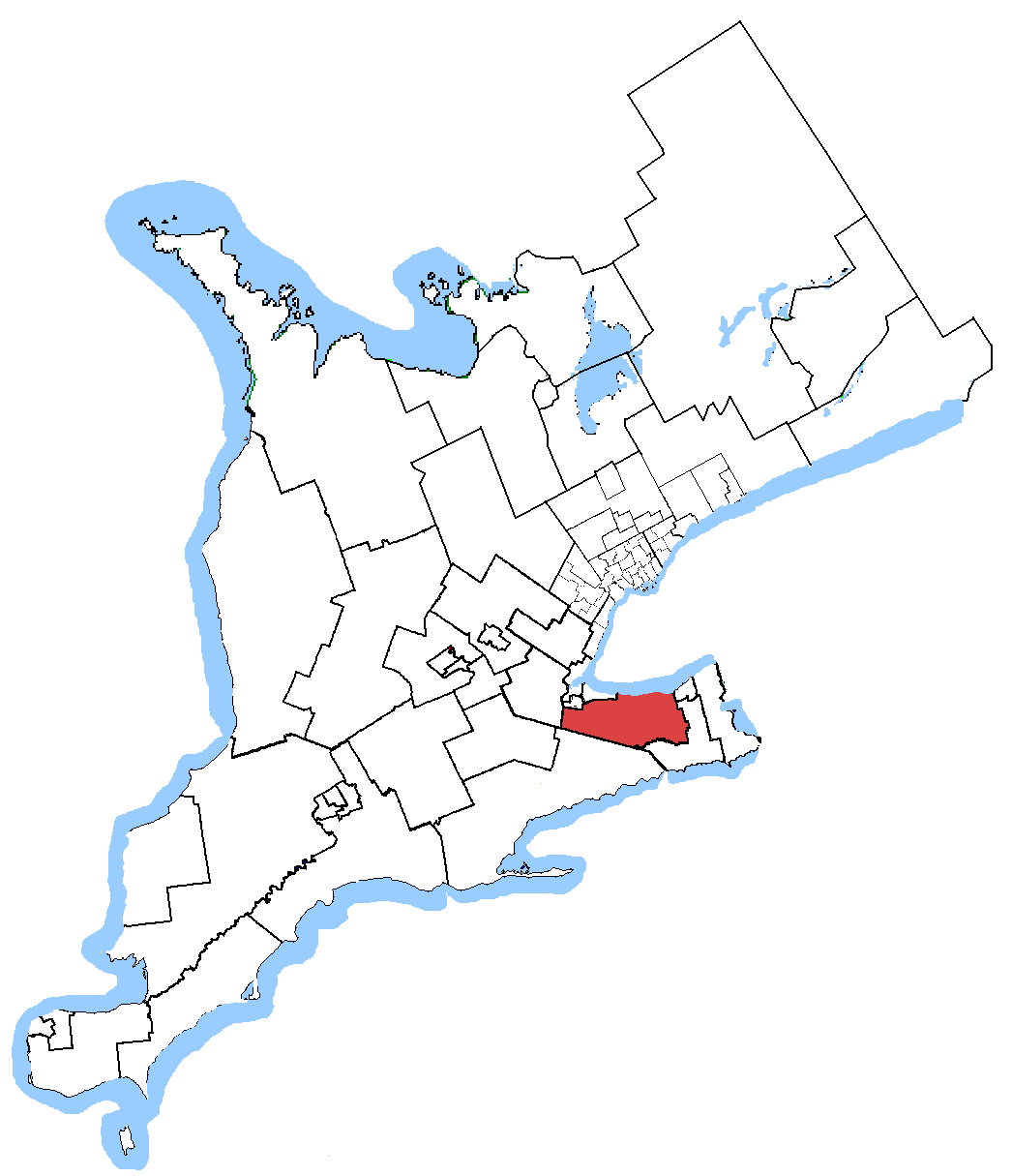
- Niagara West—Glanbrook in relation to other southern Ontario electoral districts

Defunct federal electoral district
- Legislature: House of Commons
- District created: 2003
- District abolished: 2013
- First contested: 2004
- Last contested: 2011
- District webpage: profile, map

Demographics
- Population (2011): 122,134
- Electors (2011): 85,132
- Area (km²): 1,016.47
- Census division(s): Hamilton, Niagara
- Census subdivision(s): Hamilton, Grimsby, Lincoln, Pelham, West Lincoln

Niagara West—Glanbrook was a federal electoral district in Ontario, Canada, that existed from 2004 to 2015.

The riding was created in 2003 from parts of Ancaster—Dundas—Flamborough—Aldershot, Erie—Lincoln, Hamilton Mountain, Niagara Centre, and Stoney Creek.

It consisted of the towns of Grimsby, Lincoln and Pelham, the Township of West Lincoln, and the part of the City of Hamilton lying east and south of a line drawn from the southern city limit north along Glancaster Road, east along the hydroelectric transmission line situated south of Rymal Road West, north along Glover Road, Anchor Road, Arbour Road and Mountain Brow Boulevard and east along Redhill Creek and the Niagara Escarpment to the eastern city limit.

Following the 2015 redistribution, the portion of the Niagara West—Glanbrook riding within the Niagara Region formed the new riding of Niagara West. The portions of Niagara-West Glanbrook in the City of Hamilton formed part of the new riding of Flamborough—Glanbrook.

The riding was represented for the entire period of its existence by Conservative Dean Allison.

== Electoral district ==
=== Member of Parliament ===
Parliament	Years	Member	Party
Niagara West—Glanbrook; Riding created from Ancaster—Dundas—Flamborough—Aldershot, Erie—Lincoln, Hamilton Mountain, Niagara Centre and Stoney Creek
38th	2004–2006	Dean Allison	Conservative
39th	2006–2008	Dean Allison	Conservative
40th	2008–2011	Dean Allison	Conservative
41st	2011–2015	Dean Allison	Conservative
Riding dissolved into Niagara West and Flamborough—Glanbrook

== Election results ==
2011 Canadian federal election
Party	Candidate	Votes	%	±%	Expenditures
Conservative	Dean Allison	33,701	57.25	+5.28	
New Democratic	David Heatley	12,734	21.63	+6.87	
Liberal	Stephen Bieda	8,699	14.78	-9.19	
Green	Sid Frere	2,530	4.30	-2.91	
Christian Heritage	Bryan Jongbloed	1,199	2.04	-0.02	
Total valid votes		58,863	100.00		
Total rejected ballots		194	0.33	0.00	
Turnout		59,057	66.72	+3.03	
Eligible voters		88,519	–	–	

2008 Canadian federal election
Party	Candidate	Votes	%	±%	Expenditures
Conservative	Dean Allison	28,089	51.97	+4.60	$72,842
Liberal	Heather Carter	12,955	23.97	-6.71	$66,035
New Democratic	Dave Heatley	7,980	14.76	-1.26	$4,827
Green	Sid Frere	3,897	7.21	+3.26	$7,882
Christian Heritage	Dave Bylsma	1,118	2.06	+0.10	$17,272
Total valid votes/Expense limit		54,039	100.00	$88,410	
Total rejected ballots		178	0.33	-0.03	
Turnout		54,217	63.69	-8.66	
Conservative hold		Swing		+5.7	

2006 Canadian federal election
Party	Candidate	Votes	%	±%
Conservative	Dean Allison	27,351	47.37	+7.09
Liberal	Heather Carter	17,712	30.68	-8.32
New Democratic	Dave Heatley	9,251	16.02%	+1.20
Green	Tom Ferguson	2,284	3.95	+0.56
Christian Heritage	David W. Bylsma	1,132	1.96	-0.17
Total valid votes		57,730	100.00	
Total rejected ballots		207	0.36	-0.16
Turnout		57,937	72.35	+4.97

2004 Canadian federal election
Party	Candidate	Votes	%	±%
Conservative	Dean Allison	20,874	40.28	-11.72
Liberal	Debbie Zimmerman	20,210	39.00	-1.76
New Democratic	Dave Heatley	7,681	14.82	+9.30
Green	Tom Ferguson	1,761	3.39	
Christian Heritage	David Bylsma	1,107	2.13	
Canadian Action	Phil Rose	179	0.34	
Total valid votes		51,812	100.00	
Total rejected ballots		272	0.52	
Turnout		52,084	67.38	

Change is redistributed from 2000 results. Conservative change is from a combination of Canadian Alliance and Progressive Conservative votes.

== See also ==
- List of Canadian electoral districts
- Historical federal electoral districts of Canada
