= Thomas Clark Street =

Canadian politician

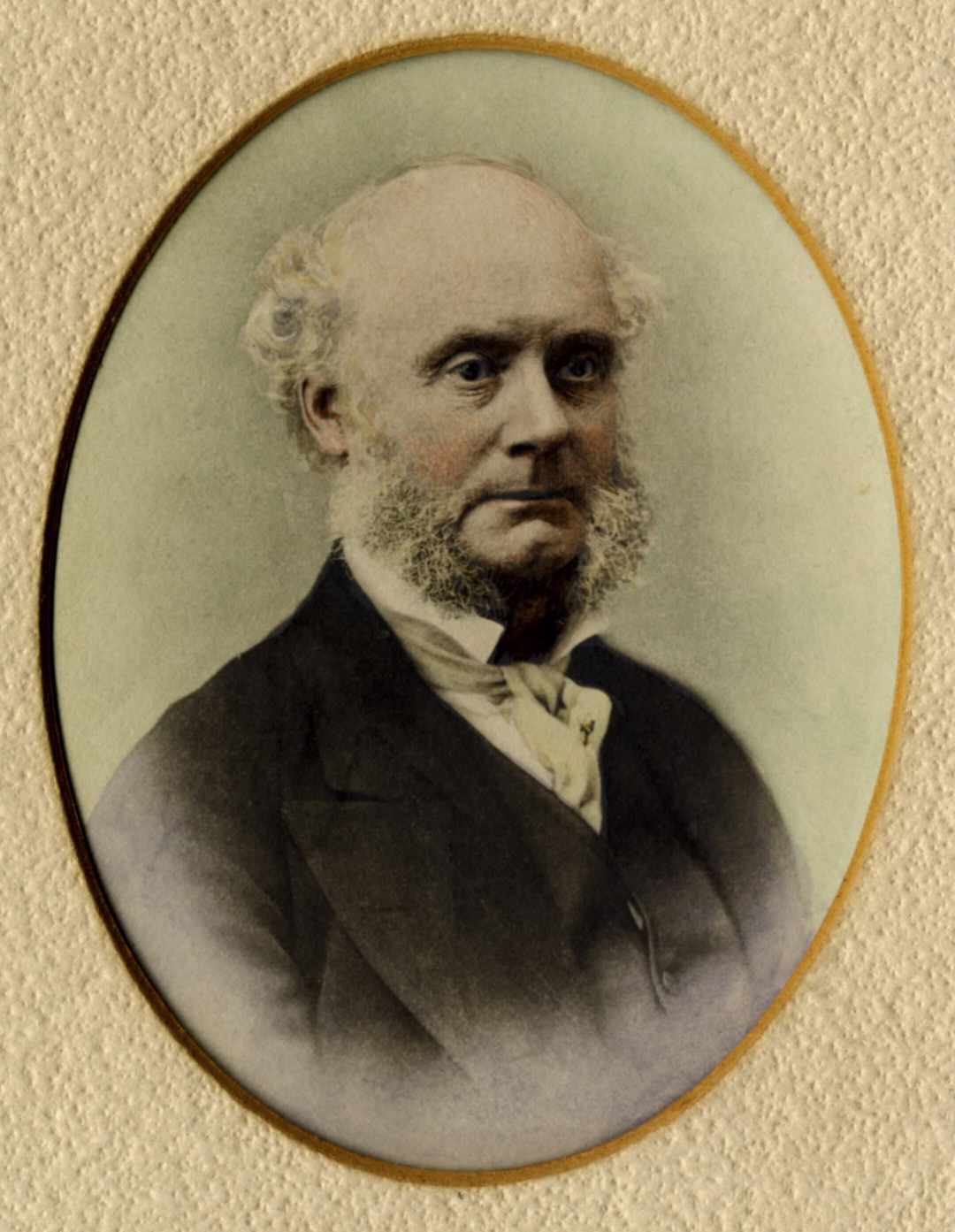
- Born: 1814
- Died: 6 September 1872 (aged 57–58)

Thomas Clark Street (1814 – September 6, 1872) was a lawyer, businessman and political figure in Ontario, Canada. He was a Conservative member of the House of Commons of Canada who represented Welland from 1867 to 1872.

He was born at Chippawa in 1814, the son of Samuel Street Jr. He studied law with Christopher Hagerman and William Henry Draper and was called to the bar in 1838. When his father died in 1844, Street took over his business interests. In 1851, he was elected to the Legislative Assembly of the Province of Canada representing Welland; he was defeated in 1854 and 1857, then reelected in 1861 and 1863. He served as a lieutenant-colonel in the local militia.

He served as president of the Niagara Falls Suspension Bridge Company and the Gore Bank. He also was a director of the Canadian Bank of Commerce and the Bank of Upper Canada.

He died at Chippawa in 1872, after being re-elected for a second term by acclamation.

1872 Canadian federal election: Welland
Party	Candidate	Votes	%
Conservative	Thomas Clark Street	1,590	60.0
Unknown	A.G. Hill	1,060	40.0
Total valid votes		2,650	100.0
Source: Canadian Elections Database

1867 Canadian federal election: Welland
Party	Candidate	Votes
Conservative	Thomas Clark Street	acclaimed
Source: Canadian Elections Database
