= Niagara South (federal electoral district) =

Federal electoral district in Ontario, Canada

Coordinates: 43.009°N 79.280°W

Ontario electoral district
- Interactive map of riding boundaries from the 2025 federal election

Federal electoral district
- Legislature: House of Commons
MP
Fred Davies
Conservative
- District created: 1996
- First contested: 1997
- Last contested: 2025
- District webpage: profile, map

Demographics
- Population (2016): 109,067
- Electors (2019): 90,698
- Area (km²): 301.26
- Pop. density (per km²): 362
- Census division: Niagara
- Census subdivision(s): Welland, Fort Erie, Thorold, Port Colborne

Niagara South (French: Niagara-Sud; formerly Niagara Centre) is a federal electoral district in the Niagara Region of Ontario that has been represented in the House of Commons of Canada from 1867 to 1988 and since 1997.

Under the 2022 Canadian federal electoral redistribution the riding was renamed.

== Demographics ==
According to the 2021 Canadian census

Ethnic groups: 83.0% White, 5.1% Indigenous, 3.1% Black, 2.5% South Asian, 1.3% Chinese, 1.2% Latin American, 1.0% Filipino
Languages: 81.0% English, 4.5% French, 2.2% Italian, 1.1% Spanish
Religions: 60.5% Christian (32.7% Catholic, 5.3% Anglican, 3.5% United Church, 1.8% Presbyterian, 1.3% Baptist, 1.2% Lutheran, 1.1% Pentecostal, 13.6% Other), 2.1% Muslim, 35.2% None
Median income: $37,600 (2020)
Average income: $46,040 (2020)

== Geography ==
Niagara South consists of the cities of Welland, Thorold, and Port Colborne, and the part of the City of St. Catharines lying south of a line drawn from the southern city limit north along First Louth St, east along St. Paul Street West, northeast along St. Paul Crescent, east and south along Twelve Mile Creek, and east along Glendale Avenue to the eastern city limit.

== History ==
=== Early ridings ===
Welland was originally created in 1867 by the British North America Act. It consisted initially of the Townships of Bertie, Crowland, Humberstone, Stamford, Thorold, and Willoughby, and the Villages of Chippawa, Clifton, Fort Erie, Thorold and Welland. In 1892, the riding was redefined to exclude reference to the Village of Clifton, and include the villages of Niagara Falls and Port Colborne, and the town of Niagara Falls. In 1903, it was redefined to consist of the county of Welland.

In 1952, it was redefined to consist of the townships of Pelham, Thorold, Crowland, Humberstone and Wainfleet, including the city of Welland and the towns of Port Colborne, Thorold, Fonthill and Humberstone.

In 1966, it was redefined to consist of:

- in Welland County, the City of Welland and the Townships of Crowland, Humberstone and Wainfleet; and
- in Haldimand County, the Townships of Canborough, Dunn, Moulton and Sherbrooke.

In 1976, it was redefined to consist of the City of Welland, the Town of Thorold, and the part of the City of St. Catharines lying south of the Canadian National Railway.

The electoral district was abolished in 1987 when it was redistributed between Welland—St. Catharines—Thorold, St. Catharines and Erie ridings.

=== Niagara Centre ===
A new riding, named Niagara Centre was created in 1996 from parts of Erie and Welland—St. Catharines—Thorold ridings. It existed only for the 1997 and 2000 elections.

It consisted of the Town of Pelham, the City of Welland, the southern part of the City of St. Catharines, and the part of the City of Thorold lying west of the Welland Canal.

The electoral district was abolished in 2003, being split between Niagara West—Glanbrook, St. Catharines and Welland ridings. A new Welland riding was created from parts of Erie—Lincoln, Niagara Centre, Niagara Falls and St. Catharines. The Welland riding was abolished in 2013, being largely replaced by a new Niagara Centre riding, losing Wainfleet and the rural southwestern corner of St. Catharines.

=== Niagara South ===
Niagara Centre was abolished following the 2022 Canadian federal electoral redistribution, and was replaced by Niagara South. It gained Fort Erie from Niagara Falls, and lost all of its territory in the City of St. Catharines to Niagara West and St. Catharines. These changes came into effect following the call of the 2025 Canadian federal election.

== Federal riding associations ==
Riding associations are the local branches of the national political parties:

Party	Association name	CEO	HQ city
Conservative Party of Canada	Niagara South Conservative Association	Jordan Vandenhoff	St. Catharines
Green Party of Canada	Niagara South Green Party Association	Sergio Paone	Thorold
Liberal Party of Canada	Niagara South Federal Liberal Association	Susan L. Barnett	Welland
New Democratic Party	Niagara South Federal NDP Riding Association	Christian Audette	Welland

== Members of Parliament ==
This riding has elected the following members of Parliament:

Parliament	Years	Member	Party
Welland
1st	1867–1872	Thomas Clark Street	Conservative
2nd	1872–1872	Thomas Clark Street	Conservative
2nd	1872–1874	William Alexander Thomson	Liberal
3rd	1874–1878	William Alexander Thomson	Liberal
4th	1878–1882	Christopher William Bunting	Conservative
5th	1882–1887	John Ferguson	Conservative
6th	1887–1891	John Ferguson	Conservative
7th	1891–1892	William Manley German	Liberal
7th	1892–1896	James A. Lowell	Liberal
8th	1896–1900	William McCleary	Conservative
9th	1900–1904	William Manley German	Liberal
10th	1903–1908	William Manley German	Liberal
11th	1908–1911	William Manley German	Liberal
12th	1911–1917	William Manley German	Liberal
13th	1917–1921	Evan Eugene Fraser	Government (Unionist)
14th	1921–1925	William Manley German	Liberal
15th	1925–1926	George Hamilton Pettit	Conservative
16th	1926–1930	George Hamilton Pettit	Conservative
17th	1930–1935	George Hamilton Pettit	Conservative
18th	1935–1940	Arthur Damude	Liberal
19th	1940–1941	Arthur Damude	Liberal
19th	1942–1945	Humphrey Mitchell	Liberal
20th	1945–1949	Humphrey Mitchell	Liberal
21st	1949–1950	Humphrey Mitchell	Liberal
21st	1950–1953	William Hector McMillan	Liberal
22nd	1953–1957	William Hector McMillan	Liberal
23rd	1957–1958	William Hector McMillan	Liberal
24th	1958–1962	William Hector McMillan	Liberal
25th	1962–1963	William Hector McMillan	Liberal
26th	1963–1965	William Hector McMillan	Liberal
27th	1965–1968	Donald Tolmie	Liberal
28th	1968–1972	Donald Tolmie	Liberal
29th	1972–1974	Victor Railton	Liberal
30th	1974–1979	Victor Railton	Liberal
31st	1979–1980	Gilbert Parent	Liberal
32nd	1980–1984	Gilbert Parent	Liberal
33rd	1984–1988	Allan Pietz	Progressive Conservative
Riding dissolved into Welland—St. Catharines—Thorold, St. Catharines and Erie
Niagara Centre; Riding created from Erie and Welland—St. Catharines—Thorold
36th	1997–2000	Gilbert Parent	Liberal
37th	2000–2004	Tony Tirabassi	Liberal
Welland
38th	2004–2006	John David Maloney	Liberal
39th	2006–2008	John David Maloney	Liberal
40th	2008–2011	Malcolm Allen	New Democratic
41st	2011–2015	Malcolm Allen	New Democratic
Niagara Centre
42nd	2015–2019	Vance Badawey	Liberal
43rd	2019–2021	Vance Badawey	Liberal
44th	2021–2025	Vance Badawey	Liberal
Niagara South
45th	2025–present	Fred Davies	Conservative

== Election results ==
View source data.
Graph of election results in Niagara Centre/Welland (1997–, parties that never received 2% of the vote are omitted)

=== Niagara South, 2025– ===
2025 Canadian federal election
Party	Candidate	Votes	%	±%	Expenditures
Conservative	Fred Davies	36,702	47.81	+14.40	$137,997.01
Liberal	Vance Badawey	33,708	43.91	+10.95	$108,894.66
New Democratic	Chantal McCollum	4,307	5.61	–17.18	$32,877.84
People's	Peter Taras	1,147	1.49	–7.46	$24,879.83
Green	Natashia Bergen	683	0.89	–1.01	$0.00
Christian Heritage	David Vedova	215	0.28	N/A	$4,905.24
Total valid votes/expense limit		77,179	99.46	–	$157,646.79
Total rejected ballots		416	0.54		
Turnout		77,595	68.09		
Eligible voters		113,955			
Conservative notional hold		Swing		+1.73	
Source: Elections Canada

2021 federal election redistributed results
Party	Vote	%
Conservative	21,920	33.41
Liberal	21,622	32.96
New Democratic	14,952	22.79
People's	5,869	8.95
Green	1,247	1.90

=== Niagara Centre, 2015–2025 ===
2021 Canadian federal election: Niagara Centre
Party	Candidate	Votes	%	±%	Expenditures
Liberal	Vance Badawey	20,576	35.0	±0.0	$110,313.54
Conservative	Graham Speck	18,324	31.2	+0.2	$47,554.12
New Democratic	Melissa McGlashan	14,086	24.0	-2.7	$35,052.11
People's	Michael Kimmons	4,670	7.9	+6.6	$9,696.81
Green	Kurtis McCartney	1,123	1.9	-3.4	$1,496.71
Total valid votes		58,779	99.3		
Total rejected ballots		437	0.7		
Turnout		59,216	63.5		
Eligible voters		93,264			
Liberal hold		Swing		-0.1	
Source: Elections Canada

2019 Canadian federal election: Niagara Centre
Party	Candidate	Votes	%	±%	Expenditures
Liberal	Vance Badawey	20,292	35.01	-0.68	$78,098.76
Conservative	April Jeffs	17,987	31.03	+1.32	none listed
New Democratic	Malcolm Allen	15,469	26.69	-4.80	none listed
Green	Michael Tomaino	3,054	5.27	+2.86	$2,561.88
People's	Andrew Sainz-Nieto	776	1.34		none listed
Christian Heritage	Nic Bylsma	308	0.53		none listed
Marxist–Leninist	Robert Walker	77	0.13	-0.04	none listed
Total valid votes/expense limit		57,963	99.08		
Total rejected ballots		539	0.92	+0.33	
Turnout		58,502	64.31	-1.33	
Eligible voters		90,698			
Liberal hold		Swing		-1.00	
Source: Elections Canada

2015 Canadian federal election
Party	Candidate	Votes	%	±%	Expenditures
Liberal	Vance Badawey	19,513	35.68	+21.32	$68,715.34
New Democratic	Malcolm Allen	17,218	31.49	-11.68	$112,516.69
Conservative	Leanna Villella	16,248	29.71	-9.36	$53,250.55
Green	David Clow	1,316	2.41	-0.07	-
Animal Alliance	Jody Di Bartolomeo	291	0.53	–	$118.73
Marxist–Leninist	Ron J. Walker	96	0.18		
Total valid votes/Expense limit		54,682	99.41	-	$218,835.14
Total rejected ballots		323	0.59	–	
Turnout		55,005	65.64	–	
Eligible voters		83,799			
Liberal gain from New Democratic		Swing		+16.50	
Source: Elections Canada

=== Welland, 2003–2015 ===
2011 Canadian federal election
Party	Candidate	Votes	%	±%	Expenditures
New Democratic	Malcolm Allen	21,917	42.2	+9.3	
Conservative	Leanna Villella	20,895	40.2	+7.9	
Liberal	John Maloney	7,276	14	-13.9	
Green	Robin Williamson	1,297	2.5	-3	
Christian Heritage	David Vangoolen	299	0.6	–	
Independent	Ray Game	169	0.3	–	
Marxist–Leninist	Ron Walker	71	0.1	-0.1	
Total valid votes/Expense limit		51,924	100.00		
Total rejected ballots		293	0.6	–	
Turnout		52,217	61.8	–	
Eligible voters		84,434	–	–	

2008 Canadian federal election
Party	Candidate	Votes	%	±%	Expenditures
New Democratic	Malcolm Allen	16,842	32.9	+2.3	$67,119
Conservative	Alf Kiers	16,542	32.3	+2.8	$84,414
Liberal	John Maloney	14,295	27.9	-7.6	$84,267
Green	Jennifer Mooradian	2,816	5.5	+2.1	
Independent	Jody Di Bartolomeo	569	1.1	–	
Marxist–Leninist	Ron Walker	114	0.2	–	
Total valid votes/Expense limit		51,178	100.0	$88,895	

2006 Canadian federal election
Party	Candidate	Votes	%	±%
Liberal	John Maloney	20,238	35.6	-4.0
New Democratic	Jody Di Bartolomeo	17,484	30.7	+1.2
Conservative	Mel Grunstein	16,665	29.3	+3.1
Green	Brian Simpson	1,960	3.4	+0.5
Christian Heritage	Irma D. Ruiter	536	0.9	-0.6
Total valid votes		56,883	100.0	

2004 Canadian federal election
Party	Candidate	Votes	%
Liberal	John Maloney	19,642	39.6
New Democratic	Jody Di Bartolomeo	14,623	29.5
Conservative	Mel Grunstein	12,997	26.2
Green	Ryan McLaughlin	1,454	2.9
Christian Heritage	Irma D. Ruiter	735	1.5
Marxist–Leninist	Ron Walker	113	0.2
Total valid votes		49,564	100.0

=== Niagara Centre, 1996–2003 ===
2000 Canadian federal election
Party	Candidate	Votes	%	±%
Liberal	Tony Tirabassi	21,641	45.73	-3.97
Alliance	Bernie Law	13,313	28.13	+3.29
New Democratic	Mike Grimaldi	7,029	14.85	+3.50
Progressive Conservative	Joe Atkinson	4,893	10.34	-1.67
Canadian Action	Tom Prue	290	0.61	
Marxist–Leninist	Ron Walker	149	0.31	+0.02
Source:Elections Canada

Note:The 2000 Alliance vote is compared to the 1997 Reform vote

1997 Canadian federal election
Party	Candidate	Votes	%
Liberal	Gilbert Parent	24,115	49.70
Reform	Don Johnstone	12,053	24.84
Progressive Conservative	Joe Atkinson	5,827	12.01
New Democratic	James Wilson	5,510	11.35
Christian Heritage	David Bylsma	515	1.06
Natural Law	Anne Larrass	363	0.75
Marxist–Leninist	Ron Walker	143	0.29
Source:Elections Canada

=== Welland, 1867–1987 ===
1984 Canadian federal election: Welland
Party	Candidate	Votes	%	±%
Progressive Conservative	Allan Pietz	18,418	42.0	+14.7
Liberal	Gilbert Parent	14,481	33.0	-10.8
New Democratic	Rob Dobrucki	10,508	24.0	-4.4
Green	Andrew Rivett	284	0.6	
Communist	John MacLennan	145	0.3	+0.1
Total valid votes		43,836	100.0	

1980 Canadian federal election: Welland
Party	Candidate	Votes	%	±%
Liberal	Gilbert Parent	18,112	43.8	+6.6
New Democratic	Robert Wright	11,729	28.4	+2.5
Progressive Conservative	George Krusell	11,292	27.3	-8.7
Communist	John Severinsky	95	0.2	0.0
Marxist–Leninist	Ron Walker	78	0.2	0.0
Total valid votes		41,306	100.0	
lop.parl.ca

1979 Canadian federal election: Welland
Party	Candidate	Votes	%	±%
Liberal	Gilbert Parent	16,025	37.2	-19.3
Progressive Conservative	Allan E. Pietz	15,527	36.1	+11.8
New Democratic	Robert Wright	11,151	25.9	+7.3
Independent	John L. Sabados	218	0.5	
Communist	John Severinsky	83	0.2	-0.4
Marxist–Leninist	Ron Walker	62	0.1	
Total valid votes		43,066	100.0	

1974 Canadian federal election: Welland
Party	Candidate	Votes	%	±%
Liberal	Victor Railton	21,228	56.5	+7.2
Progressive Conservative	Alex McCrae	9,107	24.2	-7.3
New Democratic	Jim McPherson	6,983	18.6	-0.5
Communist	John Severinsky	238	0.6	
Total valid votes		37,556	100.0	

1972 Canadian federal election: Welland
Party	Candidate	Votes	%	±%
Liberal	Victor Railton	18,693	49.3	-0.5
Progressive Conservative	Kent Hodgson	11,977	31.6	+14.0
New Democratic	Ronald Cook	7,256	19.1	-13.5
Total valid votes		37,926	100.0	

1968 Canadian federal election: Welland
Party	Candidate	Votes	%	±%
Liberal	Donald R. Tolmie	17,335	49.8	-0.5
New Democratic	Robert Wright	11,363	32.6	+6.7
Progressive Conservative	Franklin Bud Law	6,129	17.6	-6.3
Total valid votes		34,827	100.0	

1965 Canadian federal election: Welland
Party	Candidate	Votes	%	±%
Liberal	Donald R. Tolmie	17,869	50.2	-5.0
New Democratic	Robert Wright	9,206	25.9	+12.0
Progressive Conservative	T.G. Spencer	8,496	23.9	
Total valid votes		35,571	100.0	

1963 Canadian federal election: Welland
Party	Candidate	Votes	%	±%
Liberal	William Hector McMillan	19,879	55.3	+7.7
Progressive Conservative	Francis Goldring	9,291	25.8	-7.2
New Democratic	Guy Mersereau	5,010	13.9	-2.9
Social Credit	J.M. Patterson	1,413	3.9	+2.2
Communist	Frank Haslam	372	1.0	+0.2
Total valid votes		35,965	100.0	

1962 Canadian federal election: Welland
Party	Candidate	Votes	%	±%
Liberal	William Hector McMillan	17,614	47.6	+4.9
Progressive Conservative	Allan Pietz	12,209	33.0	-6.1
New Democratic	Mel Swart	6,225	16.8	-1.4
Social Credit	W.F. Trelford	630	1.7	
Communist	Frank Haslam	317	0.9	
Total valid votes		36,995	100.0	

Note: NDP vote is compared to CCF vote in 1958 election.

1958 Canadian federal election: Welland
Party	Candidate	Votes	%	±%
Liberal	William Hector McMillan	15,365	42.7	+0.3
Progressive Conservative	Allan Ernest Pietz	14,053	39.1	+5.1
Co-operative Commonwealth	Mel Swart	6,550	18.2	-5.4
Total valid votes		35,968	100.0	

1957 Canadian federal election: Welland
Party	Candidate	Votes	%	±%
Liberal	William Hector McMillan	13,241	42.4	-12.8
Progressive Conservative	William Bigelow Wellington	10,620	34.0	+7.6
Co-operative Commonwealth	Melvin L. Swart	7,356	23.6	+7.8
Total valid votes		31,217	100.0	

1953 Canadian federal election: Welland
Party	Candidate	Votes	%	±%
Liberal	William Hector McMillan	15,411	55.2	+6.5
Progressive Conservative	Clarence Lavern Robins	7,373	26.4	-6.0
Co-operative Commonwealth	Melvin L. Swart	4,408	15.8	+0.9
Labor–Progressive	Frank Haslam	721	2.6	-1.4
Total valid votes		27,913	100.0	

Canadian federal by-election, 16 October 1950: Welland
Party	Candidate	Votes	%	±%
On Mr. Mitchell's death, 1 August 1950
Liberal	William Hector McMillan	19,553	48.7	+1.4
Progressive Conservative	Sam Hughes	13,031	32.4	+6.0
Co-operative Commonwealth	Melvin L. Swart	5,972	14.9	-8.0
Labor–Progressive	Melbourne A. Doig	1,616	4.0	+0.6
Total valid votes		40,172	100.0	

1949 Canadian federal election: Welland
Party	Candidate	Votes	%	±%
Liberal	Humphrey Mitchell	23,734	47.3	+3.7
Progressive Conservative	Sam Hughes	13,259	26.4	-6.3
Co-operative Commonwealth	Armour McCrae	11,493	22.9	+6.4
Labor–Progressive	Melbourne A. Doig	1,711	3.4	
Total valid votes		50,197	100.0	

1945 Canadian federal election: Welland
Party	Candidate	Votes	%	±%
Liberal	Humphrey Mitchell	19,522	43.6	+1.3
Progressive Conservative	Thomas Oscar Oliver	14,637	32.7	
Co-operative Commonwealth	Harland Roy Potter	7,383	16.5	-5.3
Farmer–Labour	Fern A. Sayles	3,258	7.3	
Total valid votes		44,800	100.0	

Canadian federal by-election, 9 February 1942: Welland
Party	Candidate	Votes	%	±%
On Mr. Damude's death, 15 September 1941
Liberal	Humphrey Mitchell	11,875	42.3	-10.2
Independent	J. Douglas Watt	10,106	36.0	
Co-operative Commonwealth	Mark Kriluk	6,122	21.8	+14.1
Total valid votes		28,103	100.0	

1940 Canadian federal election: Welland
Party	Candidate	Votes	%	±%
Liberal	Arthur Damude	19,132	52.5	+1.9
National Government	Allan Brooks	14,491	39.8	+5.1
Co-operative Commonwealth	Ernest Woodworth	2,818	7.7	-3.5
Total valid votes		36,441	100.0	

Note: "National Government" vote is compared to Conservative vote in 1935 election.

1935 Canadian federal election: Welland
Party	Candidate	Votes	%	±%
Liberal	Arthur Damude	17,324	50.6	+5.0
Conservative	Fred M. Cairns	11,850	34.6	-19.7
Co-operative Commonwealth	Thomas C. Daly	3,836	11.2	
Reconstruction	W. Herbert Smith	1,200	3.5	
Total valid votes		34,210	100.0	

1930 Canadian federal election: Welland
Party	Candidate	Votes	%	±%
Conservative	George Hamilton Pettit	15,503	54.3	+1.7
Liberal	Arthur Byron Damude	13,037	45.7	-1.7
Total valid votes		28,540	100.0	
Source: lop.parl.ca

1926 Canadian federal election: Welland
Party	Candidate	Votes	%	±%
Conservative	George Hamilton Pettit	14,331	52.6	-7.7
Liberal	William Manly German	12,890	47.4	+7.7
Total valid votes		27,221	100.0	

1925 Canadian federal election: Welland
Party	Candidate	Votes	%	±%
Conservative	George Hamilton Pettit	12,753	60.4	+30.3
Liberal	Harry Punshon Stephens	8,373	39.6	-13.3
Total valid votes		21,126	100.0	

1921 Canadian federal election: Welland
Party	Candidate	Votes	%	±%
Liberal	William Manly German	11,195	52.9	+13.5
Conservative	Evan Eugene Fraser	6,365	30.1	-15.9
Progressive	Joseph Henry Staley	3,437	16.2	
Independent	Henry Speakman	156	0.7	
Total valid votes		21,153	100.0	

Note: Conservative vote is compared to Government vote in 1917 election, and Liberal vote is compared to Opposition vote.

1917 Canadian federal election: Welland
Party	Candidate	Votes	%
Government (Unionist)	Evan Eugene Fraser	5,378	46.0
Opposition (Laurier Liberals)	William Manly German	4,616	39.5
Labour	James Arthur Hughes	1,704	14.6
Total valid votes		11,698	100.0

1911 Canadian federal election: Welland
Party	Candidate	Votes
Liberal	William Manly German	acclaimed

1908 Canadian federal election: Welland
Party	Candidate	Votes	%	±%
Liberal	William Manly German	4,449	53.9	-3.6
Conservative	George Hanan	3,806	46.1	
Total valid votes		8,255	100.0	

1904 Canadian federal election: Welland
Party	Candidate	Votes	%	±%
Liberal	William Manly German	3,543	57.5	+5.4
Conservative	Walter Upper	2,621	42.5	
Total valid votes		6,164	100.0	

1900 Canadian federal election: Welland
Party	Candidate	Votes	%	±%
Liberal	William Manly German	2,777	52.1	+3.7
Conservative	William McCleary	2,557	47.9	-3.7
Total valid votes		5,334	100.0	

1896 Canadian federal election: Welland
Party	Candidate	Votes	%	±%
Conservative	William McCleary	2,705	51.6	+6.1
Liberal	James A. Lowell	2,536	48.4	-6.1
Total valid votes		5,241	100.0	

Note: popular vote is compared to redsult in 1891 general election.

By-election on 29 April 1892 On Mr. German being unseated, 5 April 1892
Party	Candidate	Votes
Liberal	James A. Lowell	acclaimed

1891 Canadian federal election: Welland
Party	Candidate	Votes	%	±%
Liberal	William M. German	2,726	54.5	
Conservative	John Ferguson	2,279	45.5	-6.6
Total valid votes		5,005	100.0	

1887 Canadian federal election: Welland
Party	Candidate	Votes	%	±%
Conservative	John Ferguson	2,622	52.1	+0.4
Unknown	Thos. Conlon	2,410	47.9	
Total valid votes		5,032	100.0	

1882 Canadian federal election: Welland
Party	Candidate	Votes	%	±%
Conservative	John Ferguson	1,965	51.7	+0.2
Unknown	Britton Bath Osler	1,833	48.3	
Total valid votes		3,798	100.0	

1878 Canadian federal election: Welland
Party	Candidate	Votes	%	±%
Liberal–Conservative	Christopher William Bunting	1,926	51.6	
Unknown	H. Edwin	1,810	48.4	
Total valid votes		3,736	100.0	

1874 Canadian federal election: Welland
Party	Candidate	Votes	%	±%
Liberal	William Alexander Thomson	1,682	53.0	+2.0
Unknown	E.W. Brookfield	1,493	47.0	
Total valid votes		3,175	100.0	
Source: lop.parl.ca

Canadian federal by-election, 23 November 1872: Welland
Party	Candidate	Votes	%	±%
On Mr. Street's death, 6 August 1872
Liberal	William Alexander Thomson	1,539	51.0	
Unknown	Richard S. King	1,480	49.0	
Total valid votes		3,019	100.0	

1872 Canadian federal election: Welland
Party	Candidate	Votes	%
Conservative	Thomas Clark Street	1,590	60.0
Unknown	A.G. Hill	1,060	40.0
Total valid votes		2,650	100.0
Source: Canadian Elections Database

1867 Canadian federal election: Welland
Party	Candidate	Votes
Conservative	Thomas Clark Street	acclaimed
Source: Canadian Elections Database

== See also ==
- List of Canadian electoral districts
- Historical federal electoral districts of Canada
