= Arthur Damude =

Canadian politician

Member of Parliament for Welland
- In office October 1935 – September 1941
- Preceded by: George Hamilton Pettit
- Succeeded by: Humphrey Mitchell

Personal details
- Born: Arthur Byron Damude; 15 October 1889 Thorold Township, Ontario, Canada
- Died: 15 September 1941 (aged 51) Fonthill, Ontario, Canada
- Party: Liberal
- Spouse(s): Kathleen Ross m. 12 September 1912, d. 1940
- Profession: insurance agent

Arthur Byron Damude (15 October 1889 – 15 September 1941) was a Liberal party member of the House of Commons of Canada. He was born in Thorold Township, Ontario and became an insurance agent by career and also served as reeve of Fonthill, Ontario from 1923 to 1929.

Damude made an unsuccessful attempt to win an Ontario provincial legislature seat in 1929.

He was first elected to Parliament at the Welland riding in the 1935 general election after an unsuccessful campaign there in 1930. Damude was re-elected in 1940, but died of asthma complications at his home in Fonthill on 15 September 1941 during his term in the 19th Canadian Parliament. Damude was predeceased by his wife and is survived by one son.

1940 Canadian federal election: Welland
Party	Candidate	Votes	%	±%
Liberal	Arthur Damude	19,132	52.5	+1.9
National Government	Allan Brooks	14,491	39.8	+5.1
Co-operative Commonwealth	Ernest Woodworth	2,818	7.7	-3.5
Total valid votes		36,441	100.0	

Note: "National Government" vote is compared to Conservative vote in 1935 election.

1935 Canadian federal election: Welland
Party	Candidate	Votes	%	±%
Liberal	Arthur Damude	17,324	50.6	+5.0
Conservative	Fred M. Cairns	11,850	34.6	-19.7
Co-operative Commonwealth	Thomas C. Daly	3,836	11.2	
Reconstruction	W. Herbert Smith	1,200	3.5	
Total valid votes		34,210	100.0	
