= James A. Lowell =

Canadian politician and merchant

James A. Lowell (April 21, 1849 – April 10, 1900) was a merchant and politician in Niagara Falls, Ontario. He was elected by acclamation from the riding of Welland to the House of Commons of Canada in an 1892 by-election as a Liberal and served a single term until his defeat in the 1896 federal election by Conservative William McCleary.

1896 Canadian federal election: Welland
| Party | Candidate | Votes | % | ±% |
|---|---|---|---|---|
| Conservative | William McCleary | 2,705 | 51.6 | +6.1 |
| Liberal | James A. Lowell | 2,536 | 48.4 | -6.1 |
| Total valid votes | | 5,241 | 100.0 | |

Note: popular vote is compared to redsult in 1891 general election.

By-election on 29 April 1892 On Mr. German being unseated, 5 April 1892
| Party | Candidate | Votes |
| Liberal | James A. Lowell | acclaimed |
