= Girve Fretz =

Canadian politician (1927–2020)

Claude Girven (Girve) Fretz (4 March 1927 – 5 November 2020) was a Canadian politician, who represented the electoral district of Erie in the House of Commons of Canada from 1979 to 1993. He was a member of the Progressive Conservative Party of Canada (PC).

Born in Ridgeway, Ontario, Fretz worked as a retail merchant for many years before entering politics. He served as both Mayor and Regional Councillor for the city of Fort Erie from 1977 to 1978. He won the Progressive Conservative Party nomination for Erie riding in 1979 and was elected later that year.

In Parliament, Fretz first served as the Secretary of the Progressive Conservative caucus from 1979 to 1980. He later served as parliamentary secretary to the Minister of Indian Affairs and Northern Development from 1 November 1984 to 24 November 1985, and to the Minister of State (Mines) from 25 November 1985 to 14 October 1986. He also served twice on the House Standing Committee for External Affairs, and also served on the House Standing Committee for Defence.

During the 1993 PC leadership race, he supported Alberta MP Jim Edwards on the first ballot and Jean Charest on the second ballot. He did not run for re-election in the 1993 election.

Parliament of Canada
| Preceded by first member | Member of Parliament for Erie; 1979-1993 | Succeeded by John Maloney |
