= Erie (electoral district) =

Former federal electoral district in Ontario, Canada

Ontario electoral district

Defunct federal electoral district
- Legislature: House of Commons
- District created: 1976
- District abolished: 1996
- First contested: 1979
- Last contested: 1993

Erie was a federal electoral district represented in the House of Commons of Canada from 1979 to 1997. It was located in the province of Ontario. This riding was created in 1976 from parts of Lincoln and Welland ridings.

It initially consisted of the Townships of Wainfleet and West Lincoln, the City of Port Colborne and the Towns of Fort Erie and Pelham.

In 1987, it was redefined to include the part of the City of Welland lying south of a line drawn from west to east along the Welland River, east along Broadway Avenue, north along Regional Road No. 68, east along Ontario Road, and east in a straight line to Ridge Road.

The electoral district was abolished in 1996 when it was redistributed between Erie—Lincoln, Niagara Centre and Niagara Falls ridings.

== Members of Parliament ==
This riding has elected the following members of Parliament:

Parliament	Years	Member	Party
Riding created from Lincoln and Welland
31st	1979–1980	Girve Fretz	Progressive Conservative
32nd	1980–1984	Girve Fretz	Progressive Conservative
33rd	1984–1988	Girve Fretz	Progressive Conservative
34th	1988–1993	Girve Fretz	Progressive Conservative
35th	1993–1997	John David Maloney	Liberal
Riding dissolved into Erie—Lincoln, Niagara Centre and Niagara Falls

== Election results ==
1979 Canadian federal election
Party	Candidate	Votes
Progressive Conservative	Girve Fretz	15,500
Liberal	Pierre Lafontaine	11,175
New Democratic	Clarence Gibson	6,985
Libertarian	Jerry Kubias	180

1980 Canadian federal election
Party	Candidate	Votes
Progressive Conservative	Girve Fretz	12,861
Liberal	John M. Plyley	12,334
New Democratic	Clarence Gibson	6,848
Marxist–Leninist	Betty Blashill	105

1984 Canadian federal election
Party	Candidate	Votes
Progressive Conservative	Girve Fretz	19,197
Liberal	Pierre Lafontaine	9,316
New Democratic	Elaine Havlin	5,868

1988 Canadian federal election
Party	Candidate	Votes
Progressive Conservative	Girve Fretz	15,063
Liberal	Allard Colyn	14,278
New Democratic	Sean O'Flynn	8,168
Christian Heritage	Cope Gritter	1,607

1993 Canadian federal election
Party	Candidate	Votes
Liberal	John David Maloney	19,799
Reform	Bob Lund	11,753
Progressive Conservative	Bradd Wilson	5,894
New Democratic	Lesley Penwarden	4,842
Christian Heritage	Alfred Kiers	591
National	Bill Robbins	586
Natural Law	Jeffrey Ian Dreben	197

== See also ==
- List of Canadian electoral districts
- Historical federal electoral districts of Canada
