= Vance Badawey =

Canadian politician

Member of Parliament for Niagara Centre
- In office October 19, 2015 – March 23, 2025
- Preceded by: Malcolm Allen
- Succeeded by: Fred Davies

Personal details
- Born: October 5, 1964 (age 61) Port Colborne, Ontario, Canada
- Party: Liberal
- Profession: Parliamentary Secretary to the Minister of Transport

Vance M. Badawey (born October 5, 1964) is a Canadian politician who was elected to represent the riding of Niagara Centre in the House of Commons of Canada in the 2015 federal election. He was re-elected in 2019 and 2021.

Badawey was first elected to the city council of Port Colborne in 1994, serving until 1997, at which point he was elected mayor. He retired from mayoral office in 2003, but sought another term in 2006, serving until 2014. He was simultaneously elected as a councillor for the Regional Municipality of Niagara, and served on the Police Services Board. He currently resides in Port Colborne.

On August 23, 2023, Vance Badawey was appointed Parliamentary Secretary to Canada's Minister of Transport.

He was unseated by Conservative Fred Davies in the 2025 Canadian federal election.

== Electoral record ==
=== Federal ===
2025 Canadian federal election: Niagara South
** Preliminary results — Not yet official **
Party	Candidate	Votes	%	±%	Expenditures
Conservative	Fred Davies	36,702	47.81	+14.40	
Liberal	Vance Badawey	33,708	43.91	+10.95	
New Democratic	Chantal McCollum	4,307	5.61	–17.18	
People's	Peter Taras	1,147	1.49	–7.46	
Green	Natashia Bergen	683	0.89	–1.01	
Christian Heritage	David Vedova	215	0.28	N/A	
Total valid votes/expense limit					
Total rejected ballots					
Turnout		76,762	67.86		
Eligible voters		113,111			
Conservative notional hold		Swing		+1.73	
Source: Elections Canada

2021 Canadian federal election: Niagara Centre
Party	Candidate	Votes	%	±%	Expenditures
Liberal	Vance Badawey	20,576	35.0	±0.0	$110,313.54
Conservative	Graham Speck	18,324	31.2	+0.2	$47,554.12
New Democratic	Melissa McGlashan	14,086	24.0	-2.7	$35,052.11
People's	Michael Kimmons	4,670	7.9	+6.6	$9,696.81
Green	Kurtis McCartney	1,123	1.9	-3.4	$1,496.71
Total valid votes		58,779	99.3		
Total rejected ballots		437	0.7		
Turnout		59,216	63.5		
Eligible voters		93,264			
Liberal hold		Swing		-0.1	
Source: Elections Canada

2019 Canadian federal election: Niagara Centre
Party	Candidate	Votes	%	±%	Expenditures
Liberal	Vance Badawey	20,292	35.01	-0.68	$78,098.76
Conservative	April Jeffs	17,987	31.03	+1.32	none listed
New Democratic	Malcolm Allen	15,469	26.69	-4.80	none listed
Green	Michael Tomaino	3,054	5.27	+2.86	$2,561.88
People's	Andrew Sainz-Nieto	776	1.34		none listed
Christian Heritage	Nic Bylsma	308	0.53		none listed
Marxist–Leninist	Robert Walker	77	0.13	-0.04	none listed
Total valid votes/expense limit		57,963	99.08		
Total rejected ballots		539	0.92	+0.33	
Turnout		58,502	64.31	-1.33	
Eligible voters		90,698			
Liberal hold		Swing		-1.00	
Source: Elections Canada

2015 Canadian federal election: Niagara Centre
Party	Candidate	Votes	%	±%	Expenditures
Liberal	Vance Badawey	19,432	35.7	+21.7	
New Democratic	Malcolm Allen	17,103	31.4	-10.8	
Conservative	Leanna Villella	16,157	29.7	-10.5	
Green	David Clow	1,314	2.4	-0.1	
Animal Alliance	Jody Di Bartolomeo	297	0.5	–	
Marxist–Leninist	Ron J. Walker	97	0.2	+0.1	
Total valid votes/Expense limit		54,400	100.00		
Total rejected ballots		–	–	–	
Turnout		54,400	66.1	–	
Eligible voters		82,305			
Source: Elections Canada

=== Provincial ===
2003 Ontario general election: Erie-Lincoln
Party	Candidate	Votes	%	±%
Progressive Conservative	Tim Hudak	20,348	48.49	-2.19
Liberal	Vance Badawey	16,290	38.82	+2.68
New Democratic	Julius Antal	3,950	9.41	-0.20
Green	Tom Ferguson	713	1.7	
Family Coalition	Steve Elgersma	666	1.59	-0.91

=== Municipal ===
2014 Municipal Election	Regional Councillor, Port Colborne
Candidate	Votes
Barrick, David	3,725
Badawey, Vance	3,163
Source: City of Port Colborne Election Results

2010 Port Colborne mayoral election
Mayoral Candidate	Vote	%
Vance Badawey (X)	4,800	61.58
Frank DiBartolomeo	2,995	38.42
