= Allan Pietz =

Canadian politician (1925–2021)

Member of the Canadian Parliament
- In office 1984–1988
- Preceded by: Gilbert Parent
- Succeeded by: riding dissolved
- Constituency: Welland

Mayor of Welland, Ontario
- In office 1965–1978
- Succeeded by: Eugene Stranges

Personal details
- Born: 18 June 1925 Welland, Ontario, Canada
- Died: 24 April 2021 (aged 95) Port Colborne, Ontario, Canada
- Party: Progressive Conservative

Allan Ernest Pietz (18 June 1925 – 24 April 2021) was a Progressive Conservative party member of the House of Commons of Canada. He was a businessman and dairy operator by career. He held a series of elected municipal offices in the former Crowland Township before he was elected mayor of Welland in 1965. He held office until 1978, when he did not run for re-election for mayor. He was succeeded by Eugene Stranges. In 1981, he was elected as a Niagara Regional Councillor from Welland. While holding office, he was the morning radio farm reporter for the local radio station CHOW-AM.

After several unsuccessful attempts to enter national politics at the Welland riding in the 1958, 1962 and 1979 federal elections, he won the riding in the 1984 federal election, defeating Liberal incumbent Gilbert Parent. Pietz only served one term, during the 33rd Canadian Parliament, as he was defeated in the 1988 federal election at the reorganized Welland—St. Catharines—Thorold riding by Parent.

He made a political comeback in 1991 when he was again elected as a Niagara Regional Councillor for Welland. Shortly afterward, he ran for the Chairmanship of the Niagara Regional Council, but was defeated by Brian Merritt. He did not seek re-election in 1994. Pietz died on 24 April 2021 at the age of 95 from complications of pneumonia.
