= Tony Tirabassi =

Canadian politician

Member of Parliament for Niagara Centre
- In office 27 November 2000 – 28 June 2004
- Preceded by: Gilbert Parent
- Succeeded by: John David Maloney (Welland)

Personal details
- Born: Anthony Tirabassi; 30 October 1957 (age 68) Thorold, Ontario, Canada
- Party: Liberal; Independent Liberal
- Profession: Salesman

Anthony Tirabassi (born 30 October 1957) was a Liberal member of the House of Commons of Canada from 2000 to 2004. In the 2000 federal election he won the Niagara Centre riding in Ontario to become a member of the 37th Canadian Parliament; he succeeded the Liberal incumbent, retiring Speaker of the House Gilbert Parent, who had held the riding since its creation in 1988. He is a career salesman.

His term in Parliament included service as Parliamentary Secretary of the Treasury Board President.

Tirabassi retired from political life after his first term, when his Niagara Centre riding was abolished and replaced by other electoral districts due to redistribution. Tirabassi lost the Liberal nomination for the Welland riding to John Maloney, another incumbent Member of Parliament (see 2004 Liberal Party of Canada infighting).
