= Gilbert Parent =

Canadian politician

The Honourable Gilbert Parent PC
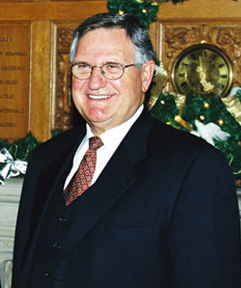
- Parent in December 2000

33rd Speaker of the House of Commons
- In office January 17, 1994 – January 29, 2001
- Preceded by: John Allen Fraser
- Succeeded by: Peter Milliken

Member of Parliament for Niagara Centre (Welland—St. Catharines—Thorold; 1988–1997) (Welland; 1979–1984) (St. Catharines; 1974–1979)
- In office November 21, 1988 – November 27, 2000
- Preceded by: Allan Pietz
- Succeeded by: Tony Tirabassi
- In office July 8, 1974 – September 4, 1984
- Preceded by: Trevor Morgan
- Succeeded by: Allan Pietz

Personal details
- Born: July 25, 1935 Mattawa, Ontario, Canada
- Died: March 3, 2009 (aged 73) Toronto, Ontario, Canada
- Party: Liberal
- Spouse(s): Joan Parent (partner); Sandra Page
- Profession: Teacher

Gilbert "Gib" Parent PC (July 25, 1935 – March 3, 2009) was a Canadian member of Parliament. He is best known in his role as speaker of the House of Commons between 1994 and 2001.

Parent was born on July 25, 1935, in Mattawa, Ontario, and his janitor father, a Mattawa-born Metis, moved the young family to Welland, Ontario. He went to St. Joseph's College on a football scholarship, and earned a teaching certificate from the Ontario College of Education.

Prior to his election to the House of Commons, he worked as a teacher and was vice-principal at Thorold Secondary School.

== Political career ==
Parent was elected to Parliament six times as a member of the Liberal Party of Canada. He was first elected in the 1974 election representing the riding of St. Catharines. He was re-elected in the 1979, 1980. Parent was defeated in the 1984 election as Brian Mulroney's Progressive Conservative Party swept to power, but regained his seat four years later in 1988, and was re-elected in the 1993 and 1997 elections.

His riding's name was subsequently changed to Welland, then Welland—St. Catharines—Thorold and finally Niagara Centre. Under Prime Minister Pierre Trudeau, Parent served, at different times between 1977 and 1981, as Parliamentary Secretary to the Minister of Veterans Affairs, to the Minister of Labour and to the Minister of State (Sports).

Parent was first elected Speaker in January 1994. In the House, Parent was forced into the challenge of presiding over a five-party Parliament that resulted from the emergence of the Bloc Québécois and the Reform Party. Upon being re-elected to the position in September 1997, he told the Montreal Gazette that he expected the different voices in Parliament, informed by strong opinions on all sides, would make the House the lively place it should be.

Parent died at Mount Sinai Hospital in Toronto at the age of 73 of pneumonia while recovering from colon cancer surgery. He is survived by his brothers, Gerald Parent and Romeo Parent, wife of 39 years, Joan Parent (née Davis), their 4 daughters, Michele (Dave) Hundertmark, Monique (John) Finley, Madeleine (Mark) Thomas, and Terri (Sandro) Perruzza and 13 grandchildren, and partner Sandra Page, 2 daughters and 1 grandchild.

== Electoral record ==
1997 Canadian federal election
Party	Candidate	Votes
Liberal	PARENT, Gib	24,115
Reform	JOHNSTONE, Don	12,053
Progressive Conservative	ATKINSON, Joe	5,827
New Democratic	WILSON, James	5,510
Christian Heritage	BYLSMA, David	515
Natural Law	LARRASS, Anne	363
Marxist–Leninist	WALKER, Ron	143

1993 Canadian federal election
Party	Candidate	Votes	%	±%
Liberal	PARENT, Gilbert	25,534	53.97%	
Reform	JOHNSTONE, Don	11,901	25.15%	
Progressive Conservative	ST. AMAND, Terry	5,472	11.56%	
New Democratic Party	DOBRUCKI, Rob	3,737	7.89%	
Natural Law	AMOS, Laureen	311	0.66%	
Green	FANNON, Jim	304	0.64%	
Abolitionist	DOUCET, Leonard	64	0.14%	

1988 Canadian federal election
Party	Candidate	Votes	%	±%
Liberal	PARENT, Gilbert	17,878		
Progressive Conservative	PIETZ, Allan	16,287		
New Democratic Party	LEE, Ken	12,646		
Green	THOMSON, Rachel	273		
No affiliation	WALKER, Ron	71		
Communist	WALLIS, David	57		

1984 Canadian federal election
Party	Candidate	Votes
Progressive Conservative	Allan Pietz	18,418
Liberal	Gilbert Parent	14,481
New Democratic	Rob Dobrucki	10,508
Green	Andrew Rivett	284
Communist	John MacLennan	145

1980 Canadian federal election
Party	Candidate	Votes
Liberal	Gilbert Parent	18,112
New Democratic	Robert Wright	11,729
Progressive Conservative	George Krusell	11,292
Communist	John Severinsky	95
Marxist–Leninist	Ron Walker	78

1984 Canadian federal election: Welland
Party	Candidate	Votes	%	±%
Progressive Conservative	Allan Pietz	18,418	42.0	+14.7
Liberal	Gilbert Parent	14,481	33.0	-10.8
New Democratic	Rob Dobrucki	10,508	24.0	-4.4
Green	Andrew Rivett	284	0.6	
Communist	John MacLennan	145	0.3	+0.1
Total valid votes		43,836	100.0	

1980 Canadian federal election: Welland
Party	Candidate	Votes	%	±%
Liberal	Gilbert Parent	18,112	43.8	+6.6
New Democratic	Robert Wright	11,729	28.4	+2.5
Progressive Conservative	George Krusell	11,292	27.3	-8.7
Communist	John Severinsky	95	0.2	0.0
Marxist–Leninist	Ron Walker	78	0.2	0.0
Total valid votes		41,306	100.0	
lop.parl.ca

1979 Canadian federal election: Welland
Party	Candidate	Votes	%	±%
Liberal	Gilbert Parent	16,025	37.2	-19.3
Progressive Conservative	Allan E. Pietz	15,527	36.1	+11.8
New Democratic	Robert Wright	11,151	25.9	+7.3
Independent	John L. Sabados	218	0.5	
Communist	John Severinsky	83	0.2	-0.4
Marxist–Leninist	Ron Walker	62	0.1	
Total valid votes		43,066	100.0	

== Archives ==
There is a Gilbert Parent fonds at Library and Archives Canada.
