= William Hector McMillan =

Canadian politician

Member of Parliament for Welland
- In office October 1950 – September 1965

Personal details
- Born: 24 January 1892 Blenheim, Ontario, Canada
- Died: 8 September 1974 (aged 82)
- Party: Liberal
- Profession: physician

William Hector McMillan (24 January 1892 – 8 September 1974) was a Liberal party member of the House of Commons of Canada. He was born in Blenheim, Ontario and became a physician by career.

He was first elected at the Welland riding in a 16 October 1950 by-election, then won successive terms there in the 1953, 1957, 1958, 1962 and 1963 federal elections. McMillan left Parliament in 1965 after completing his term in the 26th Canadian Parliament and did not seek further re-election.
