= Ingersoll (surname) =

Ingersoll is a surname derived of the Old Norse words "Ingvar" or "Inger" and "sál", common words in found in modern Icelandic, Swedish and Norwegian.

Surnames derived from Old Norse have changed over time due to the splitting of the language into modern Icelandic, Norwegian, Swedish, Greenlandic, Faroese and Danish as well as names being changed with immigration into new countries like the United States.

This surname has split over time into some of these common spellings: Ingersoll, Ingersöll, Ingersol, Ingersole, Ingvarsson, Ingersson, Inkersoll, and Ingwersol.

During the Viking Age, from the late 8th century to the mid-11th century, the Old Norse language expanded through Europe as the Vikings conquered and settled areas like Normandy (Normanni in Old Norse) and Inkersall (Ingvarsál in Old Norse).

- Andrew Ingersoll (born 1940), American astronomer and professor of planetary science at the California Institute of Technology
- Bob Ingersoll (born 1952), American lawyer and writer
- Charles Ingersoll (disambiguation), multiple people
- Colin M. Ingersoll (1819–1903), United States. Representative from Connecticut, son of Ralph Isaacs Ingersoll
- Ebon C. Ingersoll (1831–1879), United States Representative from Illinois
- Ernest Ingersoll (1852–1946), American naturalist, writer and explorer
- Ezekiel J. Ingersoll (1838–1925), American politician of Illinois
- Frederick Ingersoll (1876–1927) American inventor, engineer, and entrepreneur who created the world's first amusement park chain
- Jared Ingersoll (1749–1822), United States Constitution signer
- Jonathan Ingersoll (died 1823), Lieutenant Governor of Connecticut from 1816 to 1823
- Jonathan E. Ingersoll, (born circa 1949) American economist
- Joseph Reed Ingersoll (1786–1868), American lawyer and statesman from Philadelphia, Pennsylvania
- Ralph Isaacs Ingersoll (1789–1872), United States Representative from Connecticut
- Ralph McAllister Ingersoll (1900–1985), American publisher
- Robert G. Ingersoll (1833–1899), American orator and political leader
- Robert Stephen Ingersoll (1914–2010), American businessman and diplomat
- Robert Sturgis Ingersoll (1891–1973), American president of the Philadelphia Museum of Art from 1948 to 1964
- Robert Hawley Ingersoll, co-founder of the Ingersoll Watch Company
- Royal R. Ingersoll (1847–1931), Rear Admiral, U.S. Navy
- Royal E. Ingersoll (1883–1976), Admiral, U.S. Navy, son of Royal R. Ingersoll the elder above
- Royal R. Ingersoll, II (1913–1942), Lieutenant, U.S. Navy, son of Royal E. Ingersoll above
- Simon Ingersoll (1818–1894), American founder of Ingersoll Rand, from Connecticut
- Stuart H. Ingersoll (1898–1983), Admiral, U.S. Navy
- Thomas Ingersoll (1749–1812), Canadian early settler
- Truman Ward Ingersoll (1862–1922), US photographer
- Warren Ingersoll (1908–1995), American hockey player
- William Ingersoll (actor) (1860–1936), American actor

== See also ==
- Ingersoll (disambiguation)
- Ingvar
- Inger (given name)
- Ingvarsson
- Ingerson
- sál
