= Admiral Ingersoll =

Admiral Ingersoll may refer to:

- Royal E. Ingersoll (1883–1976), U.S. Navy admiral
- Royal R. Ingersoll (1847–1931), U.S. Navy rear admiral
- Stuart H. Ingersoll (1898–1983), U.S. Navy vice admiral
