= Charles Ingersoll =

Charles Ingersoll may refer to:

- Charles A. Ingersoll (1798–1860), American jurist
- Charles Fortescue Ingersoll (1791–1832), Canadian businessman and politician
- Charles Henry Ingersoll (1865–1948), American entrepreneur who co-founded the Ingersoll Watch Company in 1892
- Charles Jared Ingersoll (1782–1862), American lawyer and legislator
- Charles L. Ingersoll (1844–1895), American educator and president of Colorado State University
- Charles Roberts Ingersoll (1821–1903), American state legislator and executive

== See also ==
- Ingersoll (surname)
