= Ingersoll =

Ingersoll may refer to:

== People ==
- Ingersoll (surname)
- Ingersoll Lockwood (1841–1918), American lawyer and writer

== Places ==
=== Canada ===
- Ingersoll, Ontario

=== United States ===
- Ingersoll, Oklahoma
- Ingersoll, Wisconsin
- Ingersoll Township, Michigan
- Ingersoll Schoolhouse, Butte County, South Dakota

== Other uses ==
- Ingersoll Power Equipment, manufacturer of lawn equipment
- The Ingersoll Lectures on Human Immortality, lecture series at Harvard founded by a bequest from Caroline Haskell Ingersoll in memory of her father, George Goldthwait Ingersoll
- Ingersoll Rand, industrial firm founded by Simon Ingersoll and two Rand brothers
- Ingersoll Tile Elevator, in Ingersoll, Oklahoma
- USS Ingersoll, ships named Ingersoll in the United States Navy
- SS Jared Ingersoll, a World War II Liberty ship
- Ingersoll Watch Company, New York, produced the "Yankee" watch known as "The Watch that Made the Dollar Famous"
- Ingersoll Cutting tools, subsidiary of IMC, a part of Berkshire Hathaway

== See also ==
- Ingersoll's Luna Park - see Luna Park
