= USS Ingersoll =

Two ships of the United States Navy have borne the name USS Ingersoll, honoring members of the Ingersoll family. DD-652 was named for Rear Admiral Royal R. Ingersoll (1847–1931) — and for his grandson, Lieutenant Royal R. Ingersoll, II (1913–1942) who had died in the Battle of Midway, just weeks before the ship's christening. DD-990 was named for RADM Ingersoll's son, Admiral Royal E. Ingersoll (1897–1975).

- USS Ingersoll (DD-652), was a Fletcher-class destroyer, launched in 1942 and struck in 1970
- USS Ingersoll (DD-990), was a Spruance-class destroyer, launched in 1979 and struck in 1998

== See also ==
- SS Jared Ingersoll, a World War II Liberty ship, launched in 1942 and scrapped in 1964
