= Richard Rothwell =

Richard Rothwell may refer to:

- Richard Rothwell (painter), Irish portrait and genre painter
- Sir Richard Rothwell, 1st Baronet, English member of parliament
- Richard Pennefather Rothwell, Canadian-American civil, mechanical and mining engineer
