= Richard Pennefather =

Richard Pennefather may refer to:

- Richard Pennefather (Cashel MP, died 1777), Irish MP for Cashel
- Richard Pennefather (Cashel MP, died 1831), Irish MP for Cashel
- Richard Pennefather (judge) (1772–1859), Irish judge
- Richard Pennefather (civil servant, born 1806) (1806–1849), Under-Secretary for Ireland
- Richard Pennefather (colonial administrator) (c. 1828–1865), British colonial administrator in Canada and Ceylon
- Sir Richard Pennefather (civil servant) (1845–1918), Receiver of the Metropolitan Police
- Richard Pennefather (Australian politician) (1851–1914), lawyer and politician in Western Australia

== See also ==
- Richard Pennefather Rothwell (1836–1901), Canadian-American civil, mechanical and mining engineer
