= USS Ingersoll (DD-990) =

Spruance-class destroyer

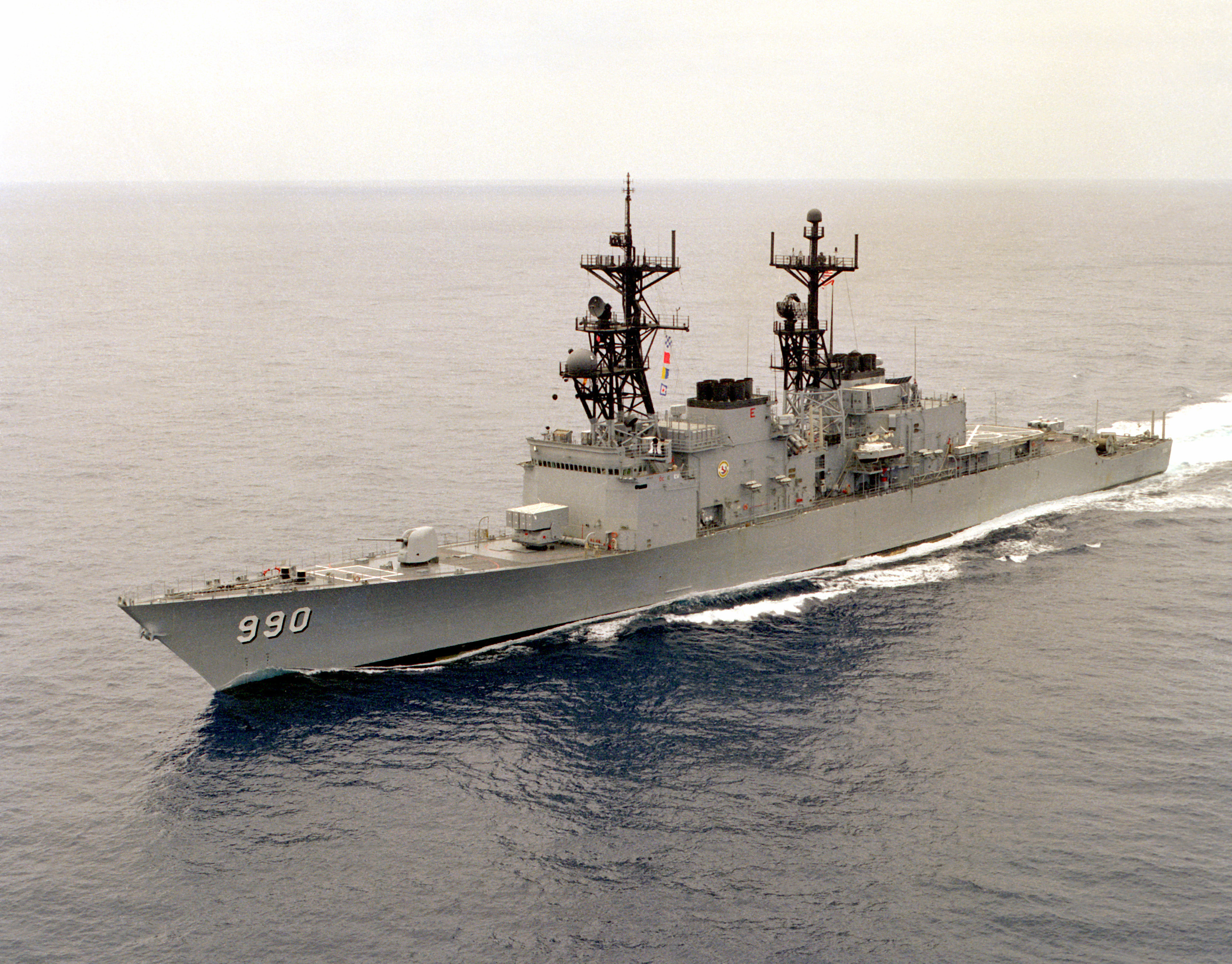
- USS Ingersoll on 1 September 1982

History

United States
- Name: Ingersoll
- Namesake: Royal E. Ingersoll
- Ordered: 15 January 1975
- Builder: Ingalls Shipbuilding
- Laid down: 5 December 1977
- Launched: 10 March 1979
- Acquired: 24 March 1980
- Commissioned: 12 April 1980
- Decommissioned: 24 July 1998
- Stricken: 24 July 1998
- Identification: Callsign: NBKW; Hull number: DD-990
- Motto: Cognitus Eventu; 'Known by the Results'
- Fate: Sunk as target, 29 July 2003
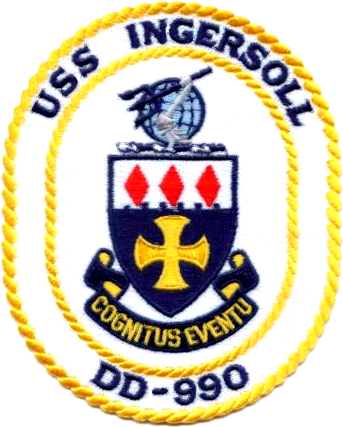
- Badge

General characteristics
- Class & type: Spruance-class destroyer
- Displacement: 8,040 long tons (8,170 t) full load
- Length: 529 ft (161 m) waterline; 563 ft (172 m) overall
- Beam: 55 ft (17 m)
- Draft: 29 ft (8.8 m)
- Installed power: 3 × 501-K17 generator sets (2,000 kW (2,700 hp) each)
- Propulsion: 4 × General Electric LM2500 gas turbines, 2 shafts, 80,000 shp (60 MW)
- Speed: 32.5 knots (60.2 km/h; 37.4 mph)
- Range: 6,000 nmi (11,000 km; 6,900 mi) at 20 knots (37 km/h; 23 mph)
- Complement: 19 officers, 315 enlisted
- Sensors & processing systems: AN/SPS-40 air search radar; AN/SPG-60 fire control radar; AN/SPS-55 surface search radar; AN/SPQ-9 gun fire control radar; Mark 23 TAS automatic detection and tracking radar; AN/SPS-65 missile fire control radar; AN/SQS-53 bow-mounted active sonar; AN/SQR-19 TACTAS towed array passive sonar; Naval Tactical Data System
- Electronic warfare & decoys: AN/SLQ-32 electronic warfare system; AN/SLQ-25 Nixie torpedo countermeasures; Mark 36 SRBOC decoy launching system; AN/SLQ-49 inflatable decoys
- Armament: 2 × 5 in (127 mm) 54 caliber Mark 45 dual purpose guns; 2 × 20 mm Phalanx CIWS Mark 15 guns; 1 × 8 cell ASROC launcher (removed); 1 × 8 cell NATO Sea Sparrow Mark 29 missile launcher; 2 × quadruple Harpoon missile canisters; 2 × Mark 32 triple 12.75 in (324 mm) torpedo tubes (Mk 46 torpedoes); 1 × 61 cell Mk 41 VLS launcher for Tomahawk missiles
- Aircraft carried: 2 × Sikorsky SH-60 Seahawk LAMPS III helicopters
- Aviation facilities: Flight deck and enclosed hangar for up to two medium-lift helicopters

USS Ingersoll (DD-990), a Spruance-class destroyer, was the second U.S. Navy ship to be named USS Ingersoll; in this case, in honor of Admiral Royal E. Ingersoll (1883–1976), who served as CINC, Atlantic Fleet during most of World War II.

== Construction and career ==
Ingersoll was laid down on 5 December 1977 by Ingalls Shipbuilding, Pascagoula, Miss.; launched on 10 March 1979; and commissioned on 12 April 1980.

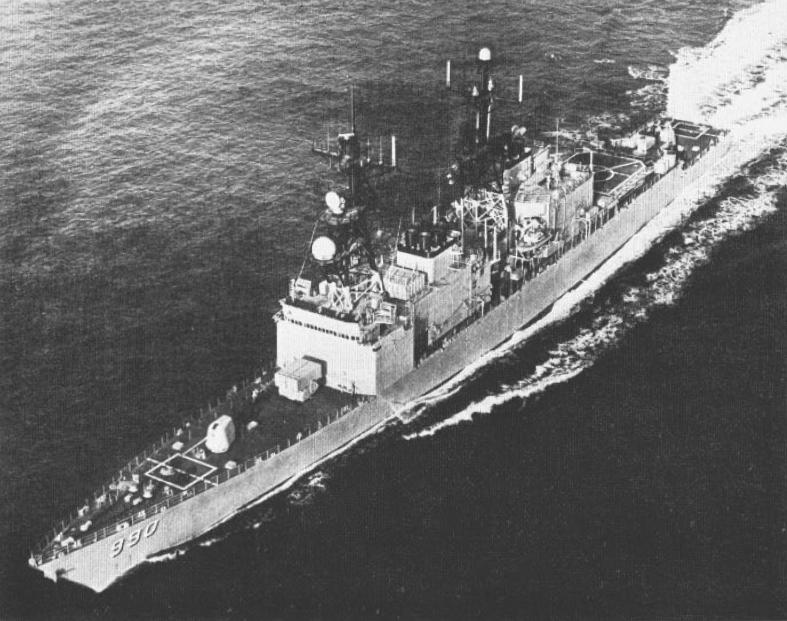
USS Ingersoll in 1981

Ingersoll was first homeported in San Diego, CA, then Long Beach, CA (for overhaul) and then Pearl Harbor.

Ingersoll was one of the first US Navy ships to receive the Armored Box Launcher version of the Tomahawk cruise missile system in 1985. This early variant of the missile system held up to four missiles in each of two canisters located directly forward of the pilothouse on the fore deck. However, this system proved to be very heavy and affected the ship's seakeeping. The much more capable Vertical Launch missile system quickly made the Armored Box Launcher obsolete.

=== Collision ===
On 20 June 1992 while transiting the Straights of Malacca, Ingersoll collided with M/V Matsumi Maru No. 7, a Pakistani oil tanker. Flooding was minimal and Ingersoll was able to reach port in Singapore. After temporary repairs, Ingersoll returned to Pearl Harbor where it completed repairs and began overhaul.

=== Fate ===
Though Ingersoll was one of the newest ships of the Spruance class, it was one of the earliest to be decommissioned. The cost to remove the Armored Box Launcher system and retrofit the Vertical Launching System likely contributed to the ship's early decommissioning. Ingersoll was decommissioned and stricken from the Naval Vessel Register on 24 July 1998. She was sunk as a target on 29 July 2003 north-northwest of Kauai, Hawaii, at 023°02′N 160°04′W.

== Gallery ==
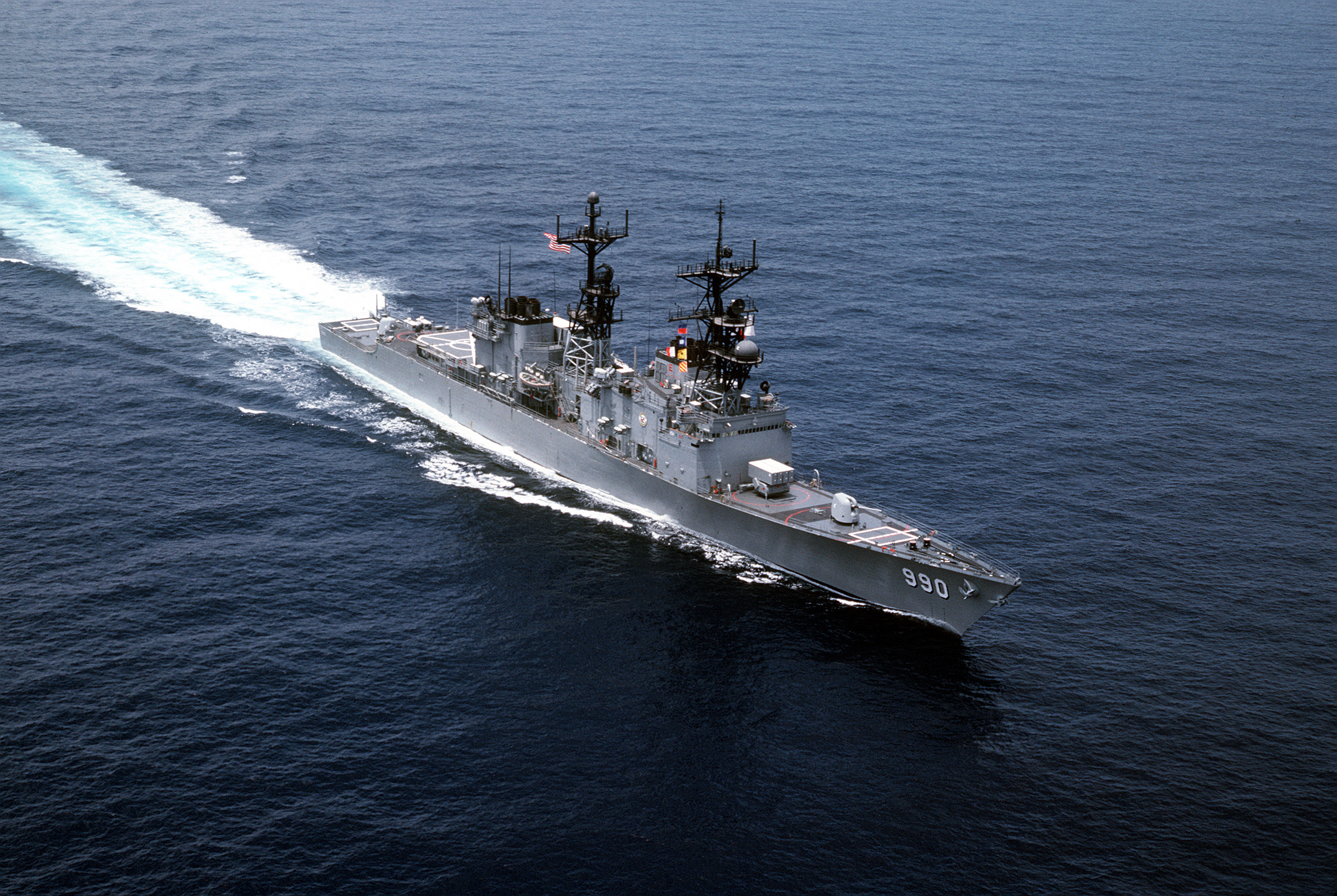
USS Ingersoll on 13 May 1982

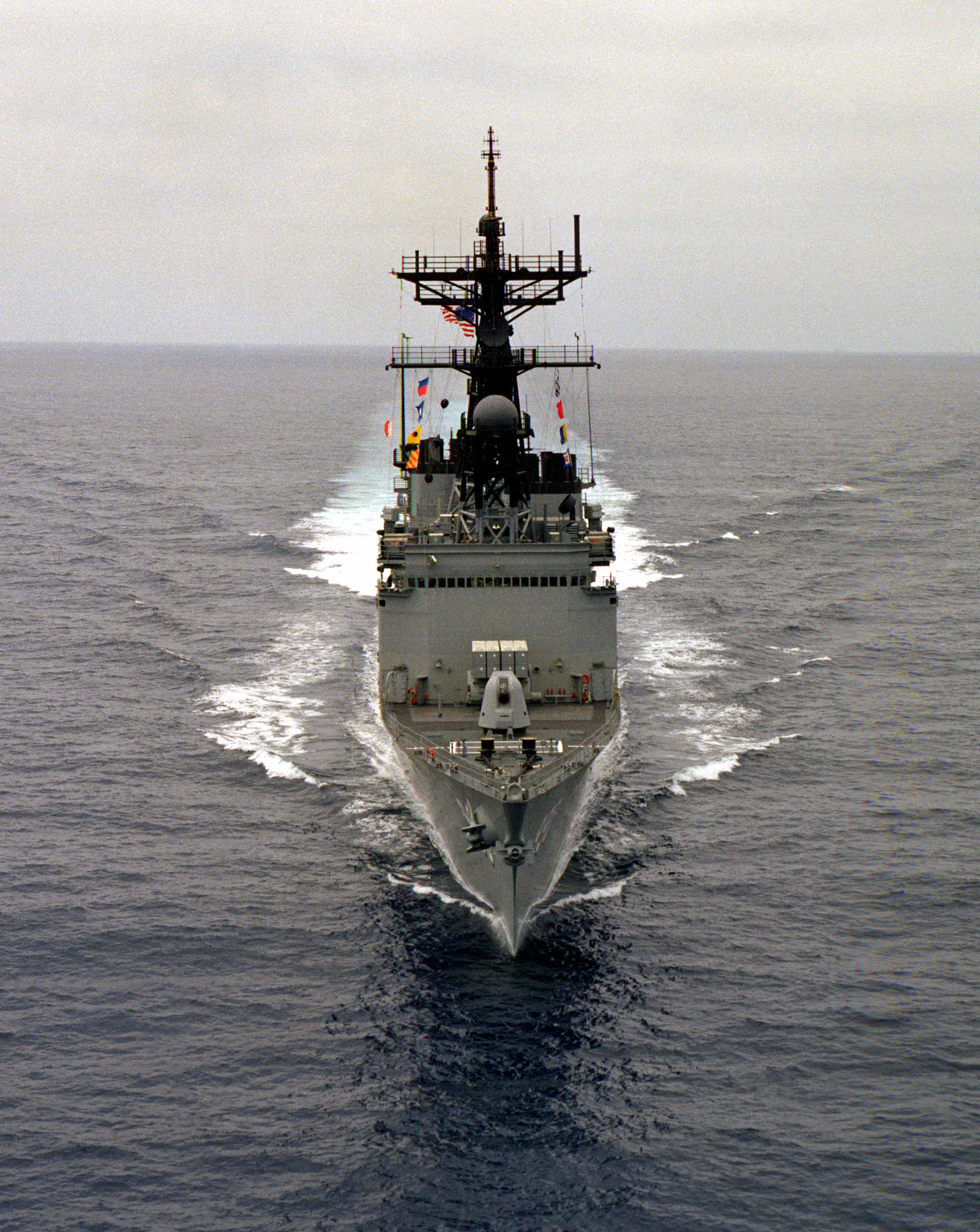
USS Ingersoll on 1 September 1982

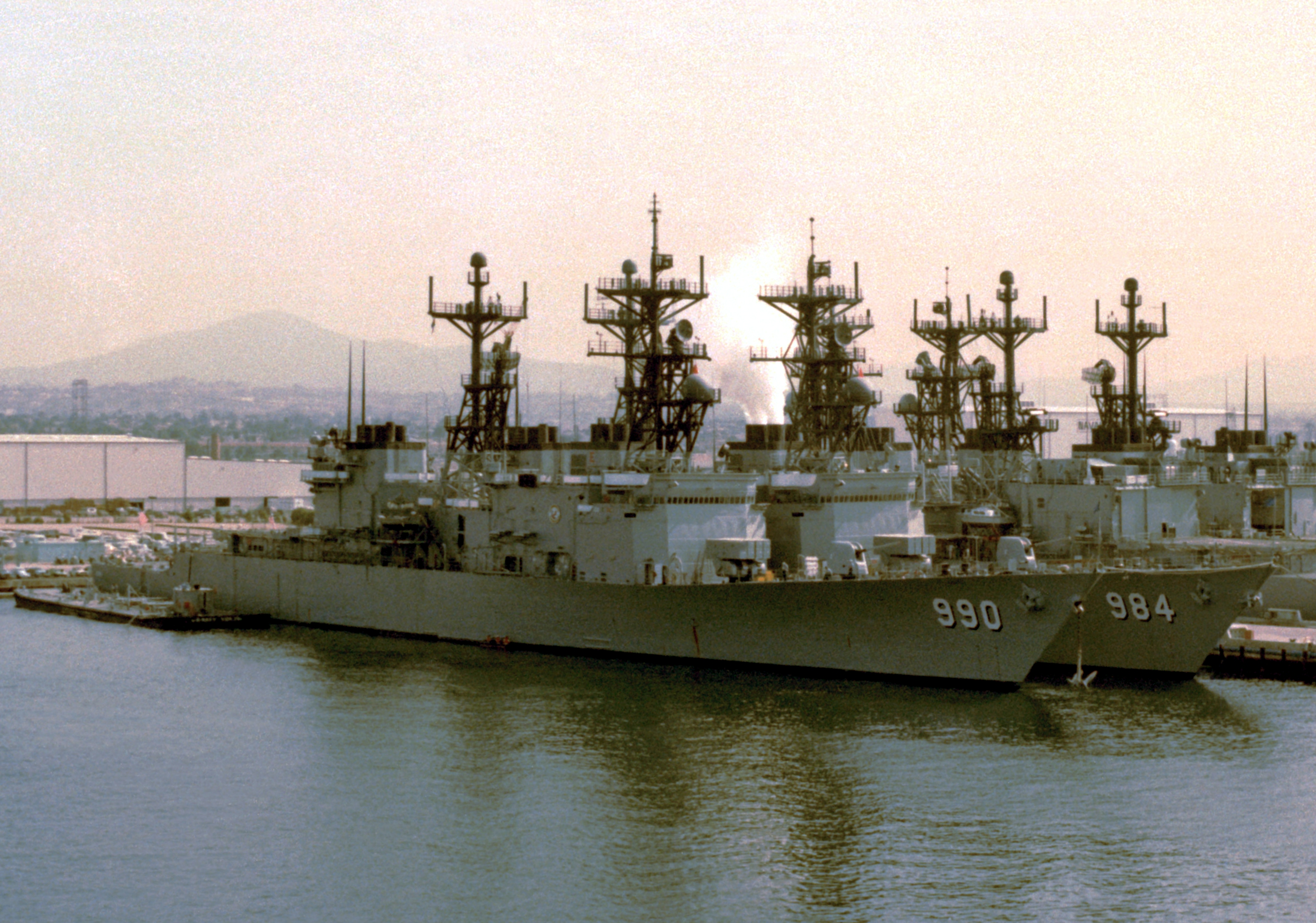
USS Ingersoll and USS Leftwich at Pearl Harbor on 1 April 1983

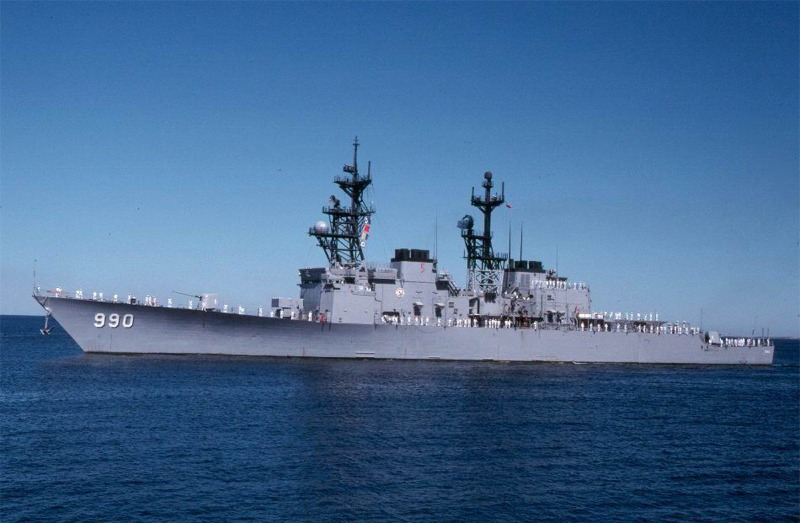
USS Ingersoll in 1989

== Awards ==
- Navy Unit Commendation – (Oct 1997 – Apr 1998)
- Navy Meritorious Unit Commendation – (Nov 1984 – May 1985, May–Sep 1992)
- Southwest Asia Service Medal – (Apr–Jul 1991)
- Humanitarian Service Medal – (11 October 1981)
