= Ingersoll Axles =

Ingersoll Axles is part of the IMT Partnership. It originated in Ingersoll, Ontario, Canada, in 1913 as a small factory producing a short-lived soap called Fun to Wash. The facility was soon converted to make brooms, and in 1914 was purchased by E.A. Wilson, who founded Ingersoll Machine & Tool (IMT) in 1915.

Ingersoll Machine & Tool specialized in the manufacture of steering gear assemblies for cars and boats – including car starters, steering gears, millimeter shells, truck axle parts, house trailer parts, and machine parts. IMT established a major presence within the automotive industry, and by the early 1930s, IMT made every steering gear assembly for Canadian-built Ford, Mercury, Dodge, Chrysler, DeSoto, Plymouth, Hudson, and Nash cars.

The company expanded significantly over the following decades and went public in 1947, listing on the Toronto Stock Exchange. By the early 1970s, IMT had diversified into washing machines and hovercraft production.

In 1970, Ivaco acquired a majority stake in IMT, later strengthening its position with the 1981 purchase of PC Forge. Around this time, IMT secured a 10-year, $100 million federal contract for large-caliber ammunition shells and built a new facility with a $125,000 grant from the Town of Ingersoll.

In 1990, IMT developed its own self-steering axle, now known as the SmartSteer Axle, which remains one of the lightest and strongest leading kingpin self-steering axles in the world.
