= Charles L. Ingersoll =

American professor of agriculture

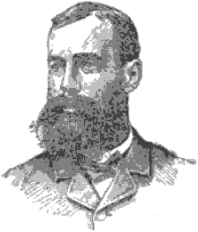

President of Colorado State University
- In office 1882–1891
- Preceded by: Elijah Evan Edwards (Ainsworth E. Blount interim)
- Succeeded by: Alston Ellis (James W. Lawrence interim)

Personal details
- Born: Charles Lee Ingersoll; November 1, 1844 Perry, New York, United States
- Died: December 8, 1895 (aged 51) Grand Junction, Colorado
- Education: State Agricultural College of Michigan

Charles Lee Ingersoll (1844–1895) was an American professor of agriculture and academic administrator.

== Career ==
Ingersoll was born in Perry, New York, on November 1, 1844. He enlisted in Ninth Michigan Cavalry in the Civil War. In 1872, he enrolled at the State Agricultural College of Michigan and received a B.S. degree in 1874. After graduating, he taught and managed the experimental farm at the State Agricultural College of Michigan.

In 1879, Ingersoll was hired as the first instructor in School of Agriculture at Purdue University. In 1882, he became the President of Colorado State Agricultural College (which later became Colorado State University), where he served until 1891. Ingersoll broadened and strengthened the curriculum Colorado State, which was a fledgling, narrow-focused struggling agricultural school when he arrived there. He then went on to serve as dean of the Industrial College of the University of Nebraska.

He died on December 8, 1895, in Grand Junction, Colorado.
