= Ingersoll, Ontario =

Town in Oxford County, Ontario

Ingersoll
- Town (lower-tier)
- Downtown Ingersoll
- Motto: Prosperity Through Progress
- Location within Southern Ontario
- Coordinates: 43°02′21″N 80°53′01″W
- Country: Canada
- Province: Ontario
- County: Oxford
- Established: 1852 (village)
- 1861 (town)

Government
  - Mayor: Brian Petrie
  - Federal riding: Oxford
  - Provincial riding: Oxford

Area
  - Land: 12.90 km^{2} (4.98 sq mi)
- Elevation: 280 m (920 ft)

Population (2021)
  - Total: 13,693
  - Density: 1,075.3/km^{2} (2,785/sq mi)
- Time zone: UTC-5 (EST)
  - Summer (DST): UTC-4 (EDT)
- Forward sortation area: N5C
- Area codes: 519 and 226
- Website: www.ingersoll.ca

Ingersoll is a town in Oxford County on the Thames River in southwestern Ontario, Canada. The nearest cities are Woodstock to the east and London to the west.

Ingersoll is situated north of and along Highway 401. Oxford County Road 119 (formerly Ontario Highway 19) runs north diagonally through the town. A Canadian National rail line bisects the town east to west through its centre. Passenger service from the Ingersoll train station is provided to other stops in Southwestern Ontario by Via Rail. To the south is the Ontario Southland Railway (former CP) line, with spurs into local industries, which provides freight service to points in the region. The local high school is Ingersoll District Collegiate Institute.

The Ingersoll area was first settled in the 1790s by families from New England, became famous for homemade cheese production before the War of 1812, and its surrounding County of Oxford was home to the first cheese factories in Canada, starting in 1864. In 1866, through collaboration by the town's businessmen, a giant wheel of cheese weighing 7,300 pounds (3,311 kg) was produced at the James Harris Cheese Factory just south of Ingersoll, for promotion of the area's cheese industry. The "Mammoth Cheese" was exhibited at the New York State Fair in Saratoga, NY, and then in England. It was a Eureka! accomplishment applauded by the whole country, and in 1867 the Canadian Dairymen's Association was established in Ingersoll, attended by nearly two hundred dairymen from across Canada, followed by annual conventions long thereafter. A booming cheese export industry in the millions of pounds grew from Ingersoll to many parts of the world, and the town's name became synonymous with quality products.

Ingersoll also developed as an industrial centre. During the late 19th century, the town's largest industries were Noxon Bros., a manufacturer of farm implements (1856-1916) and the Ingersoll Packing Co., a cheese-exporting and pork-packing firm (1880-1920s). The Noxons' firm was shuttered in 1916, but other large industries took root during the early 20th century, including the St. Charles Condensing Co. (later Borden's Condensed Milk), the Morrow Screw & Nut Co., the Ingersoll Machine and Tool Co., and the Ingersoll Cream Cheese Company.

In the 21st century, heavy manufacturing is Ingersoll's largest industry, including CAMI Assembly, a General Motors car manufacturing plant. Originally a joint venture established in 1986 with Suzuki Motors of Canada, it has produced millions of vehicles.

Ingersoll is twinned with Great Barrington, Massachusetts.

== Early history ==
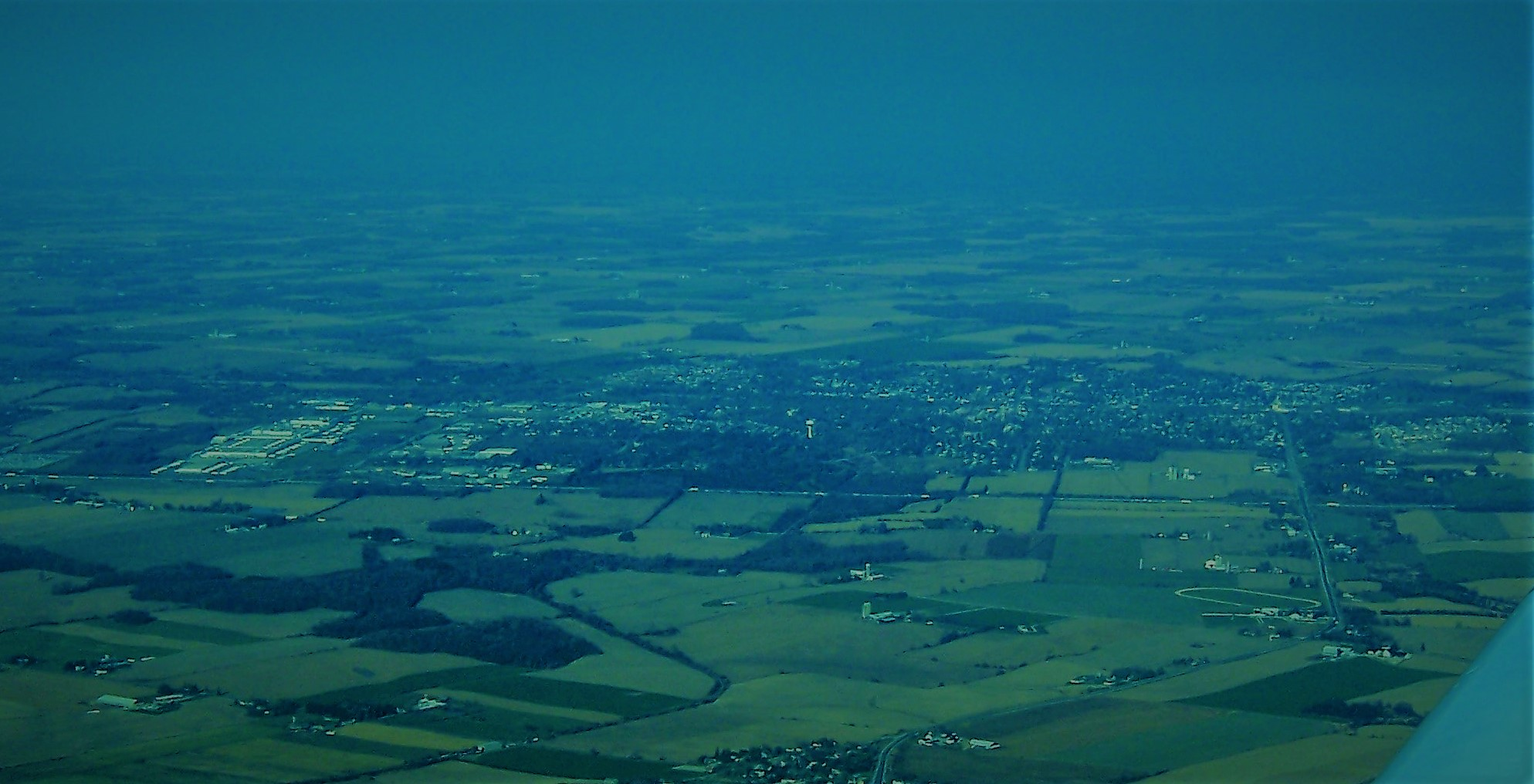
Ingersoll from the sky - a forested community amidst the farming area it serves - GM plant to the left, old Hwy 19 running north into town on right, water tower in centre, village of Salford in foreground

Ingersoll's founder, Thomas Ingersoll (1749–1812), was a native of Westfield, Massachusetts who moved to Great Barrington, Massachusetts in the early 1770s, and then to Queenston in the Niagara District, Upper Canada in 1795, where he operated an inn while organizing his grand venture to create a new settlement deep in the Upper Canadian wilderness. In 1793 he and associates had received grant of Oxford township, which became the site of the community of Oxford-on-the-Thames, and where he opened roads, established a farm for his family and settled dozens of other families on their own farms nearby. Further rights to the township were revoked in 1798, and Ingersoll's own grant was limited to 1200 acres (486 ha). Discouraged by this and the resulting slow pace of the settlement, Thomas withdrew his family from Oxford in 1806 and took up operation of a government-owned inn and ferry at Port Credit, but after his death the family decided to return to the Oxford homestead, at first Thomas Jr. (1796-1847) with James (1801-1886) in 1818, then his widow Sarah and his other children in 1821 along with eldest son Charles (1791-1832) and Charles' wife and children. Together Thomas Ingersoll's four sons laid the foundations for the hamlet of Ingersoll. Thomas's eldest daughter, Laura Secord (1775-1868), who had married in 1797, had distinguished herself as a heroine of the War of 1812, and remained with her husband and children in Queenston.

The hamlet of Ingersoll was proclaimed a village in 1852 and a town in 1865. Whereas Woodstock, the county seat, was Oxford County's administrative centre, Ingersoll became the county's principal industrial centre, in 1871 home to all four of the County's industries that had 50 or more hands. Noxon Brothers and the Eastwood foundry, both manufacturers of agricultural implements, employed 103 and 70 hands respectively. With 4,022 in population in 1871, Ingersoll's population surpassed that of Woodstock (3,982), although its advantage was not to last. By the 1860s, dairying was an emerging industry, sparked farm-wife production of cheese and butter, and then by the introduction of the factory system of cheese production in 1864. In 1866, to promote Ingersoll cheese as a high-quality, standardized brand, a cheese producer, James Harris, and local businessmen produced a 7,300-pound mammoth cheese, exhibited it at the New York State Fair in Saratoga, N.Y., and then exported it to England.

== Annual town events ==
Downtown business area along Thames, King and Oxford streets in Ingersoll, Ontario. Town Hall in centre, small park and pavilion in foreground celebrated as site of Thomas Ingersoll's 1790s homestead.

Ingersoll was home to the fall fair of the Ingersoll, North and West Oxford Agricultural Society (founded 1847) for more than a century. In 1967 it was succeeded by the Ingersoll Cheese and Wine Festival, which continued for two decades, featuring a variety of events, zaniest of which was the Mayors' Grape Stomp contest, in which the mayors from other communities, appearing in a boxing ring at the town's arena in front of cheering crowds, competed with Ingersoll's mayor to stomp the greatest quantity of juice from each one's bathtub full of grapes. From this later came Harvest Fest, a multi-day event which has now been divided into Harvest Fest, Pumpkin Fest and Kiwanis Rural Urban Dinner Night events. In 1999 a free folk festival was launched which continues each July as the Canterbury Folk Festival. For a number of years there was a Ribfest and an arts program known as the Halls Creek Festival. The year ends with Santa's Village weekends and parade and Winter Lights Festival.

== Cultural resources ==
=== Fusion Youth Centre ===
As part of a community strategic plan developed in 2003, Ingersoll Town Council adopted a vision statement that “Youth will be encouraged to achieve a high sense of purpose, of identity and of pride for, and within their community.” Towards this, the Fusion Youth Centre was developed by the town in a former elementary school property on Thames Street, which offers after-school and weekend programs and special events for any and all youth between ages 12 and 18, using the centre's meeting rooms, computer equipment, skatepark, recording studio, TV studio, gym, cafeteria and kitchen. Some of the creative work from the centre is posted on its YouTube channel at FusionIngersoll.

=== Ingersoll Seniors Activity Centre ===
Operating from a former residential and recreation complex built for Suzuki employees involved in management in the early years at the CAMI auto plant, Ingersoll Services for Seniors organizes a full calendar of social programs.

=== Ingersoll Cheese and Agricultural Museum and Sports Hall of Fame ===
Ingersoll has the distinction of having been Oxford County's cheese capital from the mid-1800s to early 1900s, producing and packaging a good deal of the county's renowned cheddar. The museum showcases the town's unique history. It opened in 1977, consisting of a re-creation of a 19th century cheese factory. Buildings that are part of the museum include: a working blacksmith shop, two barns, a bread oven and a schoolhouse portraying two different time periods of one room schools. The agricultural barns were built from lumber and timbers taken from barns found in Oxford County. It required the barn board and beams to be reclaimed from three existing barn buildings in the area. The buildings were disassembled and materials transported to the site where these building now stand. Construction was done by hand like the original process. No power tools were used in the construction of these buildings. Workers worked from a single photograph of the original Old Ingersoll Cheese Factory. The buildings were completed within 3 months by a crew of approximately 6 people from the Ingersoll area.

The Sports Hall of Fame showcases the town's athletic history. "Path of the Giants" – a 20-foot (6 m) "fully round" wood carved scene by the late Wilson Johnston – depicts the pioneer trek of his ancestors, the "Dunkards", from Lancaster, Pennsylvania to Cambridge, Ontario in the 1700s.

=== Ingersoll Creative Arts Centre ===
Started in 1972, this active arts centre features an exhibit gallery as well as offering classes in a variety of arts and crafts in pottery, painting and fibre arts studios. This arts centre is located at 125 Centennial Lane.

=== Ingersoll Pipe Band ===
The Ingersoll Pipe Band is Canada's oldest, non-military, independent pipe band. Beginning in 1910 with two brothers, Jack and James Little, their cousin William Collins, and Pipe Major Tom Johnston, the band was formed. For over 100 years the band has attracted many talented players, competed and traveled world wide. The band hall is the site for practices and offers lessons to those interested in learning to play.

=== Ingersoll Public Library ===
A branch of the Oxford County Library. It is located in the Ingersoll Municipal Building. War Memorial and Honour Roll are located on the south side of the Town Centre. In the lobby are a statue and plaque to honour Thomas Ingersoll, the founder of Ingersoll. The former library was a Carnegie library located near the corner of Thames and Charles Streets.

=== Ingersoll Theatre of Performing Arts ===
Several amateur productions are presented each year by ITOPA in the former Park Place Theatre, the town's second cinema, which has received several upgrades since 2011 to help improve the experience of its patrons.

=== Media ===
The young village's first newspaper was the Ingersoll Chronicle, begun as a weekly in 1853 and operating as both a weekly and daily starting in the 1890s, by which time it was the second-largest in the county. It ceased publication in 1919 and its offices became the Ingersoll branch of the Woodstock Sentinel-Review, the county's largest and only other daily newspaper. Starting from the 1860s, Ingersoll always had more than one newspaper published in town, sometimes several. The longest-running was the Oxford Tribune, later renamed the Ingersoll Tribune, which published as a weekly from the 1870s to the 1970s. It succumbed to competition from the Ingersoll Times, a weekly which operated for nearly fifty years before ceasing publication in 2018. A complete archive of bound volumes of the Ingersoll Chronicle which was being housed in the lower level of the Carnegie Library building was destroyed by flooding in 1976. An online archive of the Ingersoll Times spanning the internet era disappeared when its website was shut down by the newspaper's owner, Sun Media, soon after print publication ceased. As of 2018, Ingersoll is served with a monthly public announcements newsletter published in Thamesford, the Village Voice page. The Woodstock Ingersoll Echo, a new monthly newspaper, is scheduled to be launched on June 16, 2023.

== Transportation ==
Ingersoll is served by Via Rail Canada at Ingersoll station on the Quebec City-Windsor Corridor. London International Airport is the closest international airport. The closest large airport is Toronto Pearson International Airport.

== Sports and recreation facilities ==
The town of Ingersoll maintains more than 20 parks with various playgrounds, baseball diamonds, basketball courts and tennis courts as well as several nature trails. It also has several indoor facilities.

=== Ingersoll District Memorial Centre ===
For nearly sixty years the home of hockey and large-gathering indoor events in Ingersoll, this facility has a regulation-size rink, change rooms, shops, and an upstairs auditorium. The boys hockey and girls hockey leagues use the largest blocks of available ice time and also make use of available time at the arena buildings in nearby Thamesford and Embro. Planning is underway in Ingersoll for a new facility which eventually will have two rinks, an upper level walking track, and an indoor basketball court.

=== Victoria Park Community Centre ===
Ingersoll displays its spirit of renaissance with construction of this indoor pool and fitness complex at Victoria Park, a rebuild and renovation of the original pool built in the 1940s from public donations. The town publishes a full range of aquatics and fitness programs based at this facility.

=== Ingersoll Seniors Resource Centre ===
Operating from a former residential and recreation complex built for Suzuki employees involved in management in the early years at the CAMI auto plant, the Seniors Resource Centre provides support services for senior citizens.

== Demographics ==
Historical populations
| Year | Pop. | ±% |
|---|---|---|
| 1841 | 400 | — |
| 1871 | 4,022 | +905.5% |
| 1881 | 4,318 | +7.4% |
| 1891 | 4,191 | −2.9% |
| 1901 | 4,573 | +9.1% |
| 1911 | 4,763 | +4.2% |
| 1921 | 5,150 | +8.1% |
| 1931 | 5,233 | +1.6% |
| 1941 | 5,757 | +10.0% |
| 1951 | 6,524 | +13.3% |
| 1961 | 6,874 | +5.4% |
| 1971 | 7,783 | +13.2% |
| 1981 | 8,494 | +9.1% |
| 1991 | 9,378 | +10.4% |
| 1996 | 10,502 | +12.0% |
| 2001 | 10,977 | +4.5% |
| 2006 | 11,760 | +7.1% |
| 2011 | 12,146 | +3.3% |
| 2016 | 12,757 | +5.0% |

In the 2021 Census of Population conducted by Statistics Canada, Ingersoll had a population of 13,693 living in 5,467 of its 5,627 total private dwellings, a change of 7.3% from its 2016 population of 12,757. With a land area of 12.73 km^{2} (4.92 sq mi), it had a population density of 1,075.6/km^{2} (2,785.9/sq mi) in 2021.

Canada census – Ingersoll community profile

| | 2021 | 2016 | 2011 |
| Population | 13,693 (+7.3% from 2016) | 12,757 (5.0% from 2011) | 12,146 (3.3% from 2006) |
| Land area | 12.73 km^{2} (4.92 sq mi) | 12.75 km^{2} (4.92 sq mi) | 12.90 km^{2} (4.98 sq mi) |
| Population density | 1,075.3/km^{2} (2,785/sq mi) | 1,000.7/km^{2} (2,592/sq mi) | 941.8/km^{2} (2,439/sq mi) |
| Median age | 40.8 (M: 39.6, F: 41.6) | 41.1 (M: 39.7, F: 42.4) | 40.2 (M: 38.9, F: 41.3) |
| Private dwellings | 5,627 (total) 5,467 (occupied) | 5090 (total) | 4998 (total) |
| Median household income | $88,000 | $74,103 |

References: 2021 2016 2011

== Education ==
Public education is managed by the Thames Valley District School Board (TVDSB), who oversee three elementary schools; (Harrisfield Public School (formerly Harris Heights Public School), Royal Roads Public School (formerly Princess Anne Public School) and Laurie Hawkins Public School. The TVDSB also manages Ingersoll District Collegiate Institute. The current building for IDCI opened in 1954. It replaced the older, smaller building of the Ingersoll Collegiate. As a district school, it draws students from outlying rural and village communities, transported into Ingersoll by school bus.

Catholic education is under the administration of the London District Catholic School Board, who manage one elementary school in Ingersoll; St. Jude's Catholic School.

=== Historical schools ===
- Ingersoll District Collegiate Institute: The initial section of the current building was constructed in 1953, and large extensions were added in the 1960s and the 1970s, raising its capacity to serve more than a thousand students drawn by bus from a large radius inside and outside town. The original school from the 1870s was demolished in 1954. A cairn and plaque mark its original location in the front parking lot. The gymnasium building from the original school was saved and moved to a site on Kensington Avenue where it became the Peoples Revival Centre. It was demolished in 2015 to make way for eight new houses.
- Princess Elizabeth Public School: It originally opened in the same year as Canada's Confederation – 1867. The current building includes the one that opened as a replacement in 1909. This school was closed and was taken over by Vedic Institute of Canada in May, 2014.
- Victory Memorial Public School: Built in 1920, Victory Memorial School was named in honour of Canada's participation and victory in the First World War. It replaced Central Public School, built in 1850. The property had served as the site of Ingersoll's first school starting in the 1820s. Victory Memorial was closed in 2015, and the building has been repurposed as a seniors residence. The two cannons mounted in front were a gift to the town from the federal government in the early 1900s. They were cast in Great Britain and date from the reign of King George III, and most likely saw service in the War of 1812.
- Sacred Heart School: Originally founded in the early 20th century, two schools of this name have existed immediately next door to Sacred Heart Church on Thames Street North. This was the original Catholic school in Ingersoll, and from the 1970s onwards it typically held the grades three through eight, with the primary grades one and two and kindergarten classes taught at St. Jude's Catholic School. Sacred Heart School was closed and the classes transferred to an enlarged St. Jude's Catholic School in 2006. The school building itself was converted soon after into The Fusion Centre.

== Social issues ==
=== Ingersoll Train Station ===
Ingersoll has been losing its historic landmarks to the process of 'demolition by neglect'. The proud old 19th-century CN passenger station in the middle of town has deteriorated to the verge of collapse and has recently been demolished. (June 2021) .

=== Carmeuse Environmental Issues/Walker Megadump ===
Residents of Ingersoll and surrounding area have been in a militant state of opposition since the announcement in 2012 that the international conglomerate Carmeuse intends to give a 20-year lease to Walker Industries to operate a megadump taking in garbage from Toronto and London to fill the spent portion of the limestone quarry operated by Carmeuse on nearly 2,000 acres (809 ha) stretching east and north from Ingersoll's eastern boundary. Walker has referenced plans to use the quarry site for a multi-use 'campus' for garbage and recycling operations. Carmeuse has also announced plans to switch to burning garbage in its kilns, which must be heated to 1,000 °C (1,830 °F) to process limestone into industrial lime. As a preliminary step, it will conduct a pilot Alternative Low-Carbon Fuels (“ALCF”) project to assess pollution levels that result from burning 'engineered' garbage to be trucked in from New York state. Longterm, ALCF garbage to be burned would include non-recyclable paper and plastic packaging materials, cardboard/paper sludge, non-recyclable rubber and plastic from automotive manufacturing, nylon tire fluff/belting, waste materials from diaper manufacturers, and wood refuse. This could also include farm waste. The impact of all this on quality of life for the surrounding human population will be immense, and could continue for centuries.

== Historical figures ==
- Thomas Ingersoll (1749–1812) b. Westfield, Mass., removed to Great Barrington, Berkshire County, Mass., in the early 1770s where his uncles were already prominent citizens, and then to Queenston, Niagara District, Upper Canada, in 1795. While in Great Barrington he married three times, was involved in a number of businesses including partnership in a mill, joined the Episcopal (Anglican) church, and rose through the ranks of the local militia, achieving the rank of Major. With associates from Berkshire County he received grant of Oxford-on-the-Thames township in Upper Canada in 1793, and from his new base as an innkeeper at Queenston devoted his energy and resources for the next five years to opening the Oxford wilderness for dozens of families to settle there. Started his own farm within the settlement on land along the creek best suited to a millsite, which became the site of the modern town of Ingersoll. His township rights were revoked in 1798 and reduced to a grant of 1,200 acres (490 ha). Discouraged, he ceased his promotion of settlement in Oxford in 1806, moved the family and launched a new career as the government innkeeper and ferryman at Port Credit, but his sons returned to the family homestead in Oxford starting in 1818 and laid the foundations for the hamlet of Ingersoll.
- Laura Ingersoll Secord (1775–1868). Daughter of Thomas Ingersoll and wife of James Secord, who served in the militia under Isaac Brock. The couple lived in St. Davids (now Queenston) where American troops stopped at their home seeking supplies during the War of 1812. On June 21, 1813, Laura Secord overheard plans of a surprise attack on British Troops led by Lt. James Fitzgibbon at Beaver Dams. Secord was responsible for walking 20 miles (32 km) through the woods, in newly controlled American territory in the Niagara Peninsula, to Beaver Dams to warn the British. As a result of this information Lt. Fitzgibbon's small British troop and a larger contingent of allied Mohawk warriors were able to intercept and defeat the attack. Although not initially recognized for her role, Lt. James Fitzgibbon later certified that the informant was Laura Secord. Secord's story has often been embellished over the years but her role in Canadian history has since been established by various historians. Secord was never a resident of Oxford County, and possibly never visited Ingersoll, although she and her kin were highly mobile. On hearing her father had suffered a massive stroke in early 1812, she hurriedly made the 60-mile (96 km) journey to Port Credit and arrived the day before his death. In the fall of 1818, her home in Queenston became the focus of many family gatherings as Thomas Ingersoll's brother-in-law John Whiting visited from Great Barrington, Massachusetts, travelled to Port Credit to visit his sister Sarah (Thomas Ingersoll's widow), and took Sarah back with him to Great Barrington for further family reunions (it is believed that her son Charles Ingersoll went to Great Barrington in early 1819 to accompany his mother back to Canada, while sons Thomas Ingersoll Jr. and James Ingersoll were busy rebuilding the family farm in Oxford).
- Hall, Canfield, Whiting, Carroll and Harris families. On the departure of Thomas Ingersoll and family from the Oxford settlement in 1806, leadership passed to the other New England families he had encouraged to settle near him within what became the first town boundaries (roughly Harris Street in the east to Whiting Street in the west). Command of the neighbourhood within the Oxford Militia passed to Captain Ichabod Hall (1774-1814), who with brother Samuel had come with Ingersoll from the Great Barrington area in 1797. Ichabod was also W.M. of the Masonic Lodge in the settlement at the time of his death, which came two weeks after his involvement in a skirmish between Upper Canada militia and American raiders in what is now London, Ontario. Ichabod's son Elisha Hall (1800-1868) eventually took over the family farm, which included the land which is now Centennial Park and Victoria Park. Ichabod's daughter Clarissa (1803-1884) married Daniel Carroll (1805-1873), and their son Dr. D.W. Carroll (1838-1912) made creation of Memorial Park possible.
- Charles Ingersoll (1791–1832), Thomas Ingersoll Jr. (1796-1847), James Ingersoll (1801–1886) and Samuel Ingersoll (1806-1861). Sons of Thomas Ingersoll. Thomas Jr. and James were the first to return in 1818, constructing a mill pond, spillway, and raceway to drive a sawmill, which was put into operation for the first time in April 1819, lumber from which was then used to build a new family home. Charles was a comrade-in-arms, business partner and brother-in-law of William Hamilton Merritt, the St. Catharines merchant, miller, canal promoter, Tory politician, and Charles's financial backer. Charles was MP for the Oxford riding 1824–28 and 1830–32. Died of cholera in 1832. During the 1820s, the Ingersoll brothers established businesses – a grist mill, a store, a distillery, and an ashery – which became the nucleus for the hamlet of Ingersoll (a village 1852 and a town, 1865). James was appointed county land registrar in 1835, which eventually necessitated his move to Woodstock when it became the county seat in the 1840s. Thomas Jr. and Samuel were invited by the Canada Company in 1839 to build the first mills in Blanshard Township at St. Marys, and they again became town founders there.

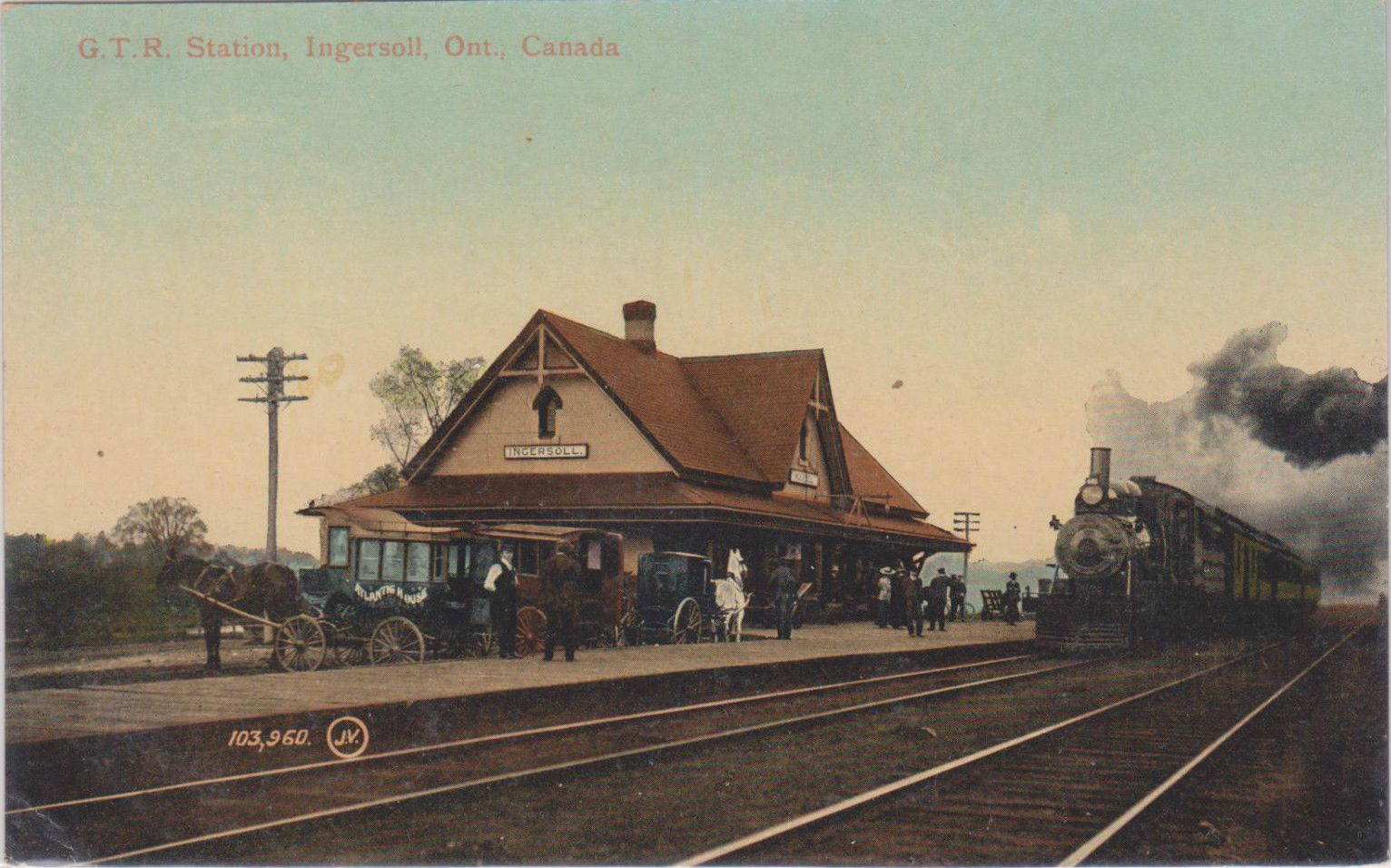
Hotel 'omnibuses' awaiting passenger train in Ingersoll c. 1900, on the railway line for which planning began in the 1830s

- McNab, Crotty, Carnegie, Holcroft and Rothwell families. By the start of the 1830s the hamlet had extended beyond the Ingersoll family ventures clustered around their millpond, and families from Ireland, Scotland and England were setting down roots, particularly on the vacant land north of it, which had remained dormant in the hands of speculators until then. Between them, Crotty (from Ireland, 1831), Carnegie (Scotland, 1834) and Rothwell (Ireland, 1834) became the owners of most of it. McNab, from Scotland via Ireland, probably came with or around the same time as Crotty. McNab and wife fell victim to the same cholera epidemic that took Charles Ingersoll in 1832. James Ingersoll became guardian of the five orphaned McNab children. Holcroft, from England, had commanded the Royal Artillery regiment in Upper Canada during the War of 1812, and became owner of large blocks of land including what is now the Ingersoll golf course. These families soon joined in collaboration with the Ingersolls and others to steer projects to improve the community. Crotty in particular led the effort in the 1840s to ensure the area's first railway would be built through the centre of the growing village rather than bypassing it. Charles. E. Chadwick, a farmer and businessman who witnessed the next half-century of growth in Ingersoll, predicted the future belonged to immigrants from many ethnic groups who would, with the aid of Canada's institutions, be moulded into a new people "not second to any in the world.".
- James Harris (1824–1885). Owner of the factory in which was built Ingersoll's famous Mammoth Cheese, 7,300 pounds, in 1866. Sponsorship of the venture came from a newly formed private corporation, the Ingersoll Cheese Company, whose shareholders included Harris, farmers who supplied the milk and expertise for construction of the mammoth, and businessmen. The cheese was exhibited at the New York State Fair at Saratoga in 1866, and then exported to England.
- Adam Oliver (1823–1882). Born Scotch Lake settlement, near Fredericton, NB in 1823. Moved with his family to Middlesex County, Upper Canada, in 1819. Moved to nearby Ingersoll, 1850. There he established himself as a lumberman, mill owner, contractor, and politician. Developed businesses in Orillia (1868–72) and Thunder Bay District (1872–78). Mayor of Ingersoll, 1865–66. Warden of Oxford County, 1866. MLA for the Oxford riding, 186–-75. His daughter Belle Chone Oliver (1875-1947) became a medical doctor and devoted her life to improving health care in India.

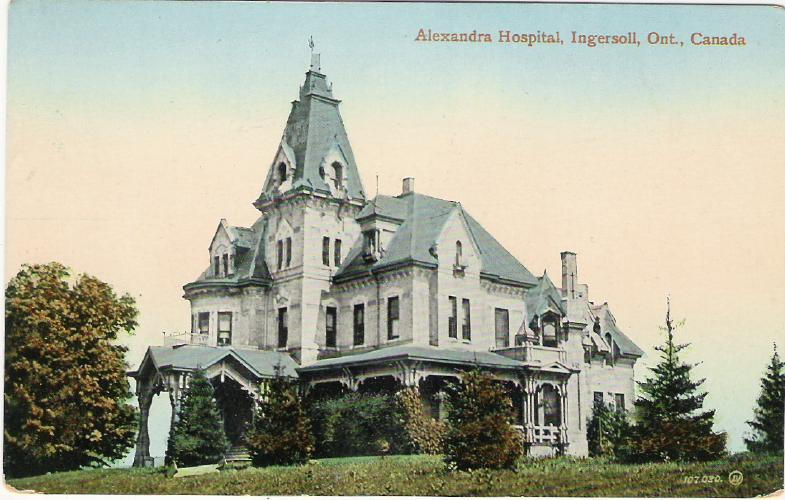
James Noxon House, after it was acquired by the town for its hospital

- James Noxon (1833–1906). Born Bloomfield, Prince Edward County, Upper Canada. Moved to Ingersoll, Canada West, 1856. With his brothers and his father's financial backing, he established one of the largest manufactory of agricultural implements in the province (Noxon Company Ltd.) and the chief industry in Ingersoll. In 1878 he built a mansion which was later to become the town's Alexandra hospital (1909). Mayor of Ingersoll, 1884–85 and 1887. As president of the firm and its largest shareholder, James lived beyond his means, running up credit and draining the company's resources to pay the bank interest. To save the firm, his brothers ousted him in 1887. He removed to Woodstock to become plant manager of Patterson & Brother, an agricultural implements firm (1887–1891) and then to Toronto, to serve as provincial Inspector of Prisons and Charities (1891–1905). Meanwhile, in Ingersoll, the Noxon Company's Noxon-family ownership ended in 1898, the company lost its prominence of early years, and the company was shuttered in 1916.
- James McIntyre (1828-1906). Born in Scotland, moved to Canada 1841, and to Ingersoll, 1854. Cabinetmaker and undertaker, proprietor of furniture factory. But best remembered as author of some famously awful poetry, and above all for his 1866 poem, "Ode on the Mammoth Cheese", a tribute to 7,300-pound cheese that local men built to advertise the Ingersoll brand.

We have seen thee, queen of cheese,
Lying quietly at your ease,
Gently fanned by evening breeze,
Thy fair form no flies dare seize.

- Hugh McKay Sutherland (1843–1926). Born P.E.I. Moved to Oxford County, 1849. Worked for Adam Oliver as a bookkeeper in 1858 and became a partner in the Adam Oliver Company, formed 1867, Became a partner in the company's sawmill business, 1868–72. Became Dominion Superintendent of Public Works for the Northwest Territories, 1874–78. Removed to Winnipeg where he succeeded as a promoter of railway, mining, and lumber companies. MP for Selkirk, Manitoba, 1882–87. Retired to England, where he died in 1926.
- Lt. Col. William George Wonham (1819-1887), Provincial Land Surveyor, Ingersoll. b. England 1819. Resided in Ingersoll by 1851. Drew the 1857 Tremaine Map of Oxford County. Married with four children but became a widower in 1861. Died in Winnipeg after surgery for a stomach tumour; remains buried beside wife in Ingersoll. Wonham Street in Ingersoll is named for him. During the early 1880s he left Ingersoll for the Northwest to take employment with the Dominion Department of the Interior. In 1884, in an interview with the Winnipeg Times, he described his work in the Rocky Mountains in surveying a national park [Banff] for the Dominion Government:

"Some time ago I received instructions from the Department of the Interior to proceed to the Rockies and survey a park in the Cochrane Ranch Co.’s timber limit, using my own judgment as to the best location. The spot I located is about 4 miles from East Padmore and about 64 miles from Calgary in the first range of the Rockies. The scenery is grand and beautiful in the extreme, rivalling everything I have ever seen. The surface of the park, which is traversed from one end to the other by the main line of the C.P.R. is heavily timbered and contains one large lake and several smaller ones. The surface is very rocky and broken and the hills are picturesque in the extreme. As the train service does not extend past Calgary the journey west of that point has to be made by hand car. On the return journey the pumping apparatus broke, and owing to the strong wind and the track being on the downgrade we ran the car at the rate of thirteen miles per hour for seven hours by standing up and holding our coats sail fashion to catch the wind."

- Robert Stuart, (1852–1926), born in Embro, raised in Ingersoll. Robert's extended family of origin comprised three Stuart brothers who emigrated to Canada from Banffshire, Scotland, and had businesses in Ingersoll John, a miller (1825–1899), Peter, a miller (1827–98), and Robert, a grocer (1834–1913). Robert's father, John Stuart, operated mills in Embro and Ayr during the early 1850s. In 1858 he bought Elisha Hall's sawmill in Ingersoll, which he converted into an oatmeal mill (named North Star Oatmeal Mills). In 1873 John sold North Star Oatmeal Mills to his brother, Peter; moved to Cedar Rapids, Iowa, with his son, Robert; and opened a second North Star Oatmeal Mills in Cedar Rapids. In 1874 John and Robert entered into partnership with a railroader, George Douglas Sr., of Cedar Rapids. In 1876 Robert married Maggie Shearer, a niece of George Douglas. In 1877 Robert Stuart & George Douglas of Cedar Rapids Iowa became co-partners with the father, John Stuart, and an Ingersoll miller, W.S. King, in founding new steam mill in Ingersoll, on north side of the River Thames. The father and son team, John and Robert, later opened a second mill in Chicago. There in 1899 Robert became a co-founder of the American Cereal Company, which was renamed the Quaker Oats Company in 1901. Robert's progeny did well with that company. His son, Robert Douglas Stuart (1886–1975), became CEO of Quaker Oats in 1922 and served as United States ambassador to Canada from 1953 to 1956. His grandson, Robert Douglas Stuart Jr. (1916–2014), was CEO of Quaker Oats from 1966 to 1981 and served as United States Ambassador to Norway from 1984 to 1989.

== Historical landmarks ==
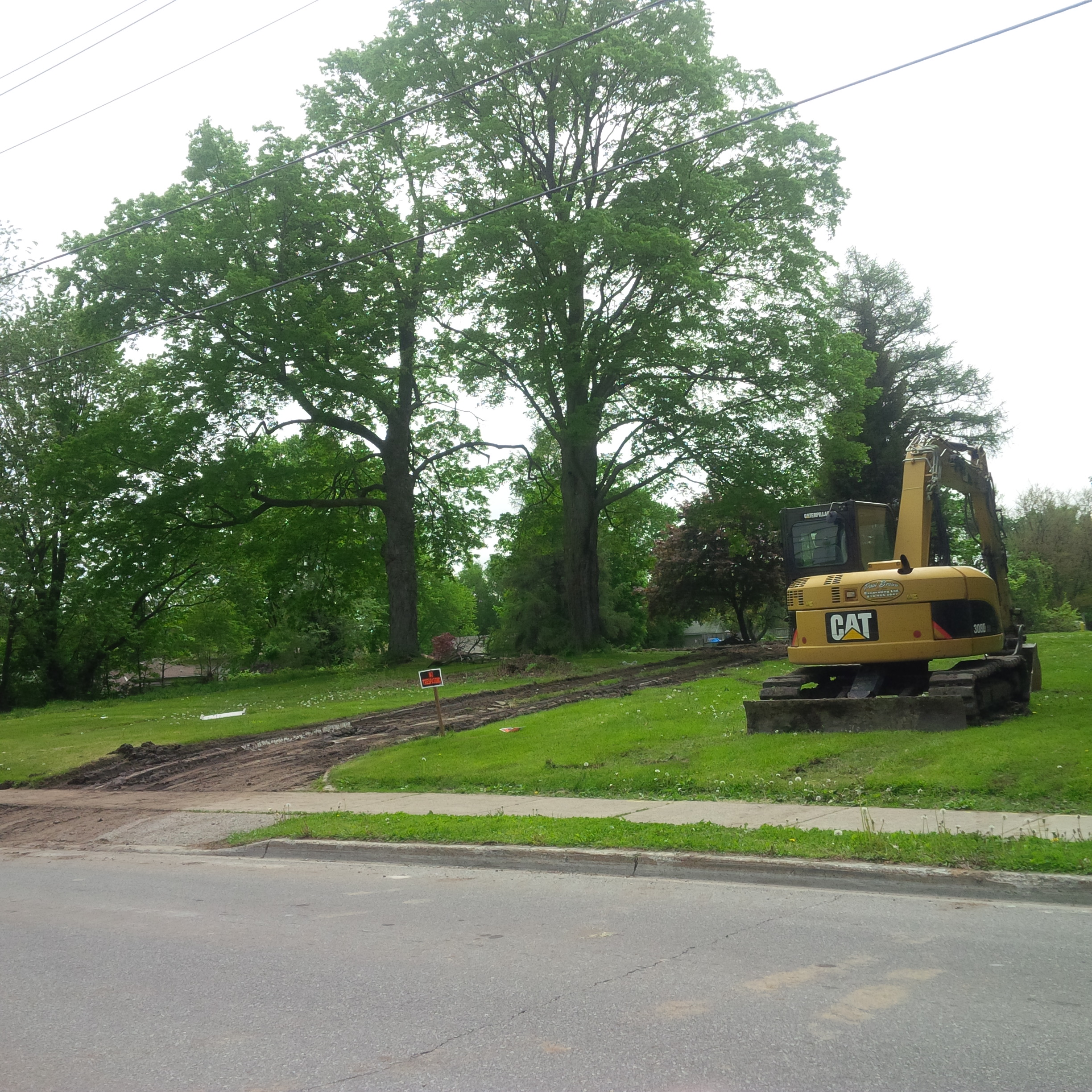
Demolished May 2017

=== Elisha Hall House ===
The first constructed of brick in the hamlet of Ingersoll in the 1830s and the centrepiece of a large property near to what is now Royal Roads Public School (210 King Street East), this was the home of Elisha Hall (1800-1868), rival to James Ingersoll for title of first child born in village, farmer and sawmill owner, local rebel leader in the Rebellion of 1837, confidant of William Lyon Mackenzie during his exile, W.M. of local Masonic lodge, advocate for emancipation of slaves and fair treatment of local black community, and figurehead of the Reform party in Oxford for the remainder of his years. His house was demolished in 2017 without public comment, a sad example of the lack of protection for heritage properties in Ingersoll.

=== Rothwell House, 1835 ===
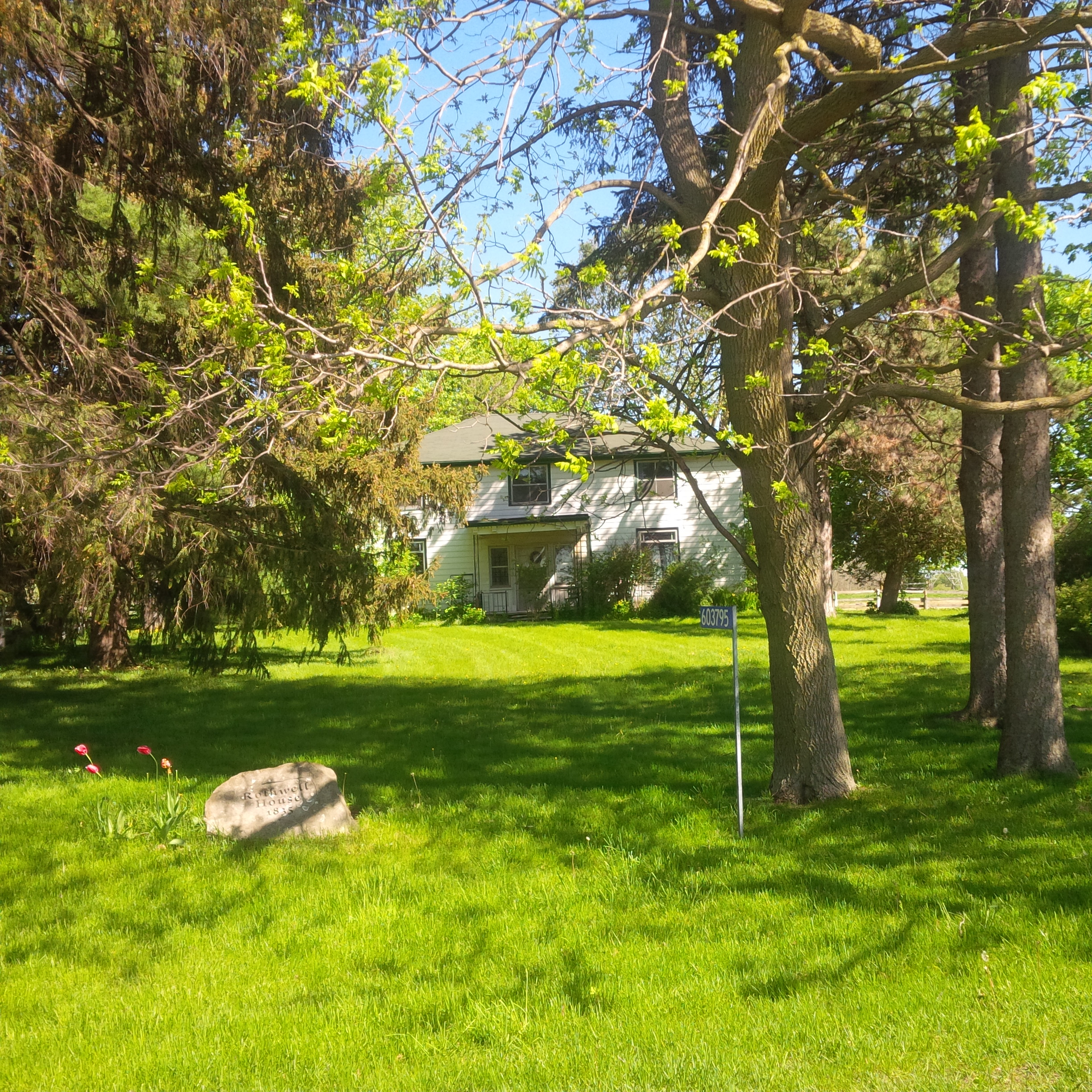
Rothwell House, 1835 and commemorative stone

Located on Cemetery Lane, this was the home of Rev. John Rothwell and family, and is one of the few heritage properties for which documentation survives describing its construction, being letters written at the time to family back in Ireland by Rothwell's wife. The Rothwells were landholders in County Meath, north of Dublin, and it may have been their promise of employment for tradesmen to construct their home which drew Edward Comiskey, a carpenter from their hometown who later had a hand in the construction of the first St. James Anglican Church.

=== Elm Hurst ===
Now the hub of the Elm Hurst Inn and Spa (Harris Street at 401), this was the home of James Harris (1824-1885), who operated the Maple Leaf Cheese Factory on the same property, where the world-famous Mammoth Cheese was manufactured in 1866.

=== Christopher Brothers Residences ===
Building contractors and operators of a steam saw mill and lumber export business in Ingersoll's boom years in the 1860s and 1870s, the four Christopher brothers built palatial residences for themselves, each distinguished with a central tower. Two still stand - one serves as the Royal Canadian Legion Branch 119 (211 Thames Street North) and the other as Oxford Manor (276 Oxford Street). The two which have been lost to the wrecker's hammer were nearby the Legion property on Thames Street North.

=== Norsworthy House ===
Norsworthy House (250 King St. E.) was home to the family of James Counter Norsworthy (1846–1936). James, native of Devonshire, England, had moved to the Thamesford area in 1852, entered the insurance business, and in 1876 removed to Ingersoll, where he became an inspector for the North British Mercantile Insurance Co. Norsworthy acquired his house in 1878, as part of a dowry from his marriage to Mary Jane Cuthbert (1853–91). James had four sons and a daughter by his first wife, Mary Jane. After her death in 1891, at the age of 38, he remarried to Mrs. John T. MacDonald of Sarnia in 1895.

Today, the Norsworthy family is known for its family home, a stately Victorian mansion. styled "Norleigh." James enlarged the house to add an office and a separate entrance for clients and a large front porch; and he added ornate features such as stained glass windows and finely carved fireplaces, and an upper-story tank to supply the house with water in a gravity system.

The family is remembered for its outstanding contribution to Canada's war effort during the First World War. All four Norsworthy sons enlisted as officers, and two of them, Edward and Fred, were killed in action. After the loss of his sons, J.C. Norsworthy became an expert historian on the war and travelled extensively to speak on the subject.

The house is rumoured to be haunted by the ghost of Norsworthy's first wife, Mary Jane, who died in 1891 after nursing her children back to health from diphtherias. Perhaps the ghostly Mary Jane's target was the second wife, the replacement mother for her children. That said, the current owners have never seen the Lady in Grey or anything else that could be considered ghostly. Neither have any of the guests who have stayed with them through the bed and breakfast they operate.

== Natural areas and parks ==
=== Victoria Park ===
Ingersoll's first park, established in 1869. It was known as the Town Park until 1882 when, on the occasion of the town's Queen's Birthday Celebration, it was named Victoria. This park lies adjacent to Centennial Park and is home to the Victoria Park Community Recreation Centre.

=== Soldiers' Carroll Memorial Park ===
Ingersoll's second oldest park and, unlike Victoria Park, located near the centre of the town (north of Canterbury Street and east of Thames Street). Formerly the site of Partlo's mill pond. The town established Soldiers' Carroll Memorial Park in 1919, using a bequest from Dr. D.W. Carroll (1838–1912), by purchasing and draining of Partlo's mill pond. Hall's Creek, which formerly flowed into the pond, continued, but its course was changed and widened; rustic bridges were erected and other improvements made, including the installation of a swimming pool for children. Also about 1920, the Lady Dufferin Chapter, Imperial Order Daughters of the Empire, erected a Park Cenotaph to honour Ingersoll men who gave their lives and served the Empire in two World Wars and the Korean War. Thus, many townspeople have referred to Carroll's Park as Memorial Park. In 2006 a Town by-law renamed Memorial Park honour of Yvonne Holmes Mott (1934-2005) for "outstanding contributions to the Town and its people over her lifetime."

Each July the Park serves as the main venue for the annual Canterbury Folk Festival, with the main stages, seating area, beverage tents, and craft vendors located there.

=== Centennial Park ===
This eight-acre park was created as a Canada Centennial project in 1967. The Ingersoll Cheese Factory Museum and the Creative Arts Centre are located at the upstream end of the former Stuart's Millpond (1822-1909). Centennial is a long and narrow, grass-lined park with a variety of young and older trees. There is a small cheese-themed playground with benches and a walking bridge over a small babbling brook. The playground and benches are constructed of natural wood and bright yellow 'cheese slices'. The backs of the benches look like pieces of Swiss Cheese with the requisite holes. Camping is allowed in the summer with basic toilet facilities at a cost of $15.00 per night. In the winter, there is a charming display of lights that runs the length of the park from the entrance on Harris Street to the exit on Wellington Street.

=== John Lawson Park and Trail ===
Located along the south bank of the Thames River, this park contains walking trails in a natural area. Accessed from Charles St. West, at the bottom of Wonham St. South.

=== Smith's Pond Park ===
This park is a natural area with walking trails, tall grass, and an annual fishing derby. Its location on the south side of Canterbury Street is the former site of Smith's mill pond. This pond vanished on 5 March 1976 when its swollen waters broke through the embankment supporting Smith's dam. The park was established in 2000. The park includes the ruins of the old cement dam and a new, much smaller pond, created by splitting the flow of Hall's Creek. One fork of the creek runs through the pond, the other fork alongside it.

=== 19th-century millponds ===
Early mills required water power, which was obtained by damming steams to create millponds and mill races. Thus, Ingersoll's first pond most likely dated from the years 1818-1819, when Thomas Ingersoll Jr. and James Ingersoll built a saw mill on the family farm, fulfilling their father's vision when he chose the site for his family in 1793. Construction of a dam, spillway, raceway and millwheel machinery and structures was a complex process, but the saw mill was finally put into operation by April 1819. This was followed by construction of a grist mill as the family ventures grew. By the 1850s Ingersoll had five ponds whose mill races delivered power to grist mills, flour mills, saw mills and a woollen mill. All five ponds were located south of the River Thames, four of them using water from two north-flowing tributaries of the Thames River and one using water from the Thames itself. Three mill ponds were located along Hall's Creek, which flowed swiftly northward from Elisha Hall's farm: Hall's Pond (later Stuart's Pond), Smith's Pond, and Smith's "lower pond" (later Partlo's Pond). To the west was Benson's Pond (later King's Pond) on Whiting Creek. Lastly, there was Carroll's pond, just south of the River Thames. To make this pond, Daniel Carroll diverted water from the west-flowing Thames to create an artificial, west-flowing creek; then he damned the creek to create the pond and mill race, which delivered power to two grist mills; the outflow of water from these mills returned the creek water to the River Thames.The last of the ponds, Smith's Pond, came to an end in 1976.

The advent of steam power in the 1850s freed industries from dependence on water power and proximity to mill ponds. This allowed new industries to locate on the north side of the Thames and other hitherto neglected places.

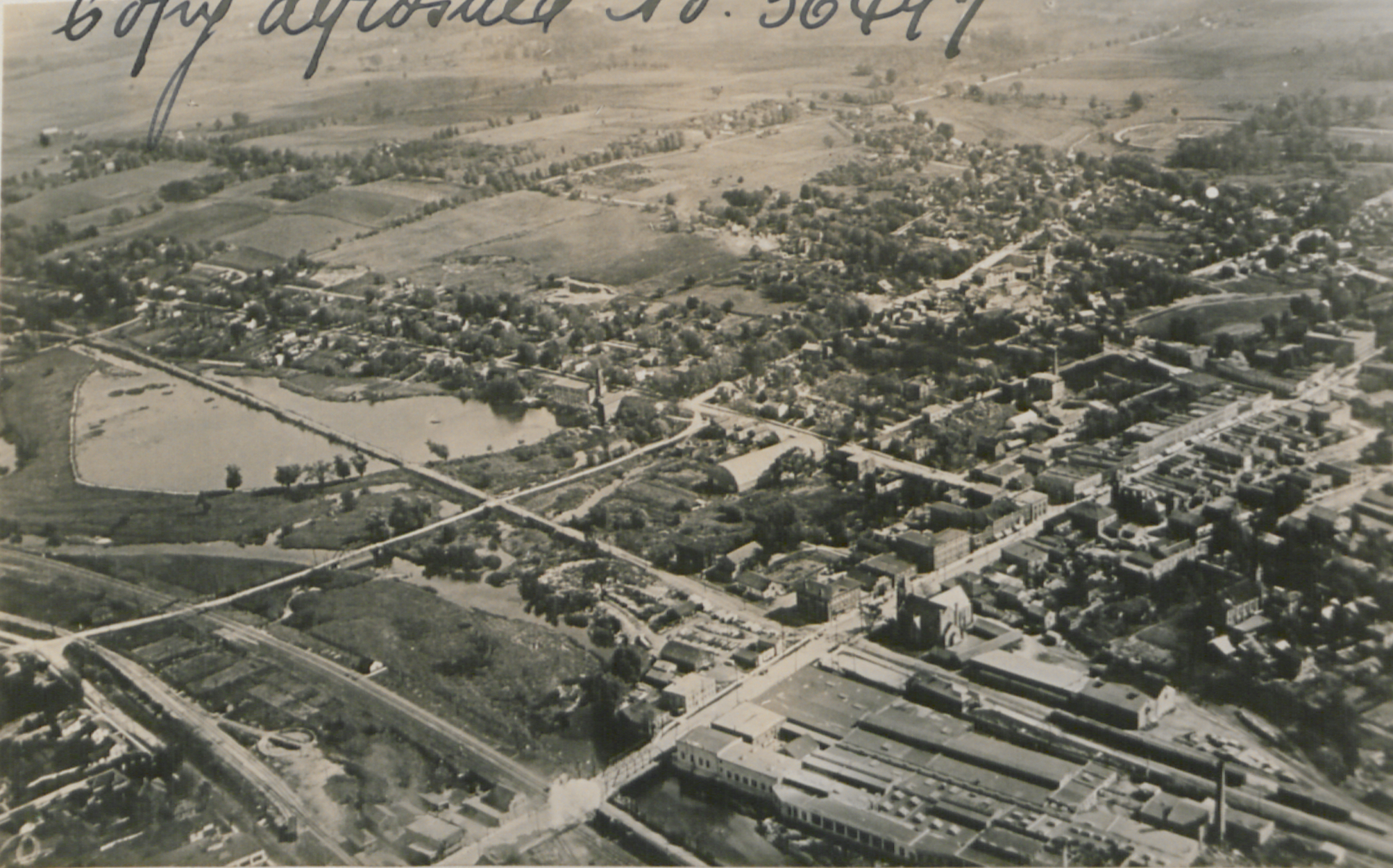
1919 aerial view of Carroll's pond (Noxon factory roof in foreground).

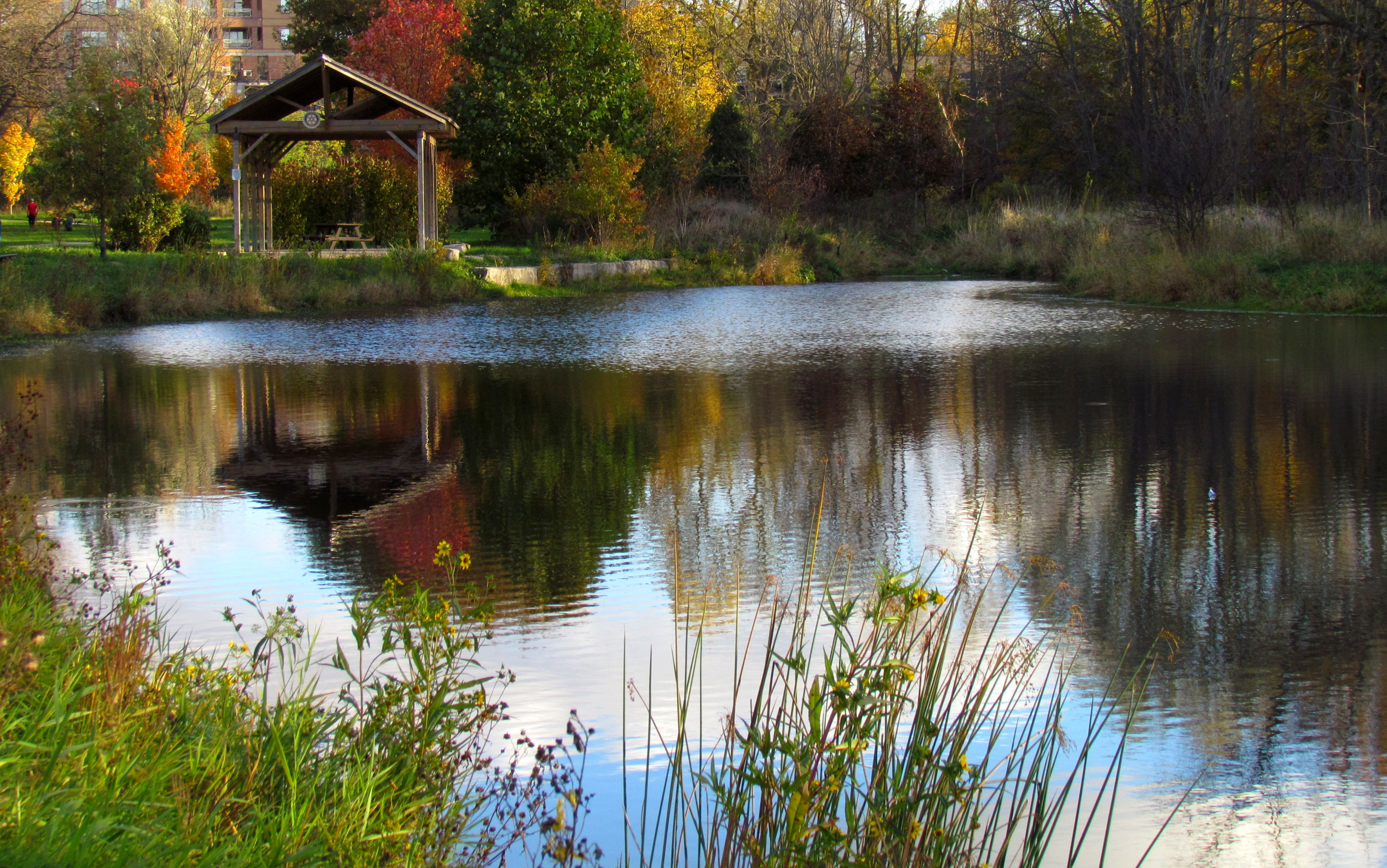
Smith's Pond Park in Ingersoll.

== Historical churches ==
From the earliest days, the people of the Oxford settlement were drawn to evangelicals and evangelism. The families brought in by Thomas Ingersoll were active in an era when Puritanism (Congregational Church) was still the official religion in most of New England, and a great many could not abide the extreme self-denial preached by such men as the pastor at Great Barrington, one of many who have been described by historians as "Puritans gone haywire". The Anglican, Methodist and Baptist forms of worship had become popular alternatives. Thomas Ingersoll's associate, Rev. Gideon Bostwick was so popular that the people of Great Barrington refused to make any further payments to support the Congregational pastor, although required by law. Bostwick's missionary circuit from Great Barrington grew to include parts of Vermont, Connecticut, New York state, and the whole western end of Massachusetts. In his journeys he preached in the same frontier towns as Baptist and Methodist missionaries. After Bostwick's unexpected death in 1793, at least five Baptist preachers were amongst the Thomas Ingersoll settlers, and Methodist missionaries won the hearts of two of Ingersoll's daughters. All of the churches established in the hamlet of Ingersoll had their origin in such missionary work. As the community grew, it raised its own missionaries who went out into the wider world, including the first mayor's daughter Dr. Belle Chone Oliver, and most famous of all, Aimee Semple McPherson.

=== First Baptist Church ===
Without any resident clergy, the Oxford settlement relied on visiting missionaries for spiritual guidance in its earliest years. Amongst the first of these to make the journey were sent by Baptist associations in the state of Vermont, where families such as the Canfields and Burdicks, who were headed by Baptist preachers, had spent time before their move to Canada in the 1790s. Members of the first Baptist congregations joined in covenants to watch over each other. By the 1850s there were several such separate congregations in the Ingersoll area. A Baptist Meeting House opened "on the side of a hill in Albert Street, near the English [Anglican] Church" in June, 1858. This came from ongoing efforts to unite the separate congregations, which continued for the next four decades under pastors such as the Rev. John Dempsey(1822-1899). A graduate of the first Baptist College in Canada which operated in Montreal in the 1840s, Dempsey was appointed pastor in several communities in Quebec and Ontario (including Ingersoll) during his career, and after retiring to Ingersoll, he continued with efforts to develop a Baptist College in Oxford, at Woodstock (later moved to Toronto, then to Hamilton, as the nucleus of today's McMaster University). The fully united congregation in Ingersoll constructed a red brick church building in 1896, on what is now the northeast corner of Thames Street South and Canterbury Street. This building was destroyed by fire following a lightning strike in 1898, but was immediately re-built on the existing site. It is still an active, community-oriented, Christian Church.

=== British Methodist Episcopal Church ===
During the 1850s and 1860s a congregation of escaped slaves from the American south grew up in Ingersoll who were served by this church, which owned a building on Catherine Street from about 1860 to 1900. Its most famous pastor was the Rev. Solomon Peter Hale (1815–1903), whose flamboyant sermons drew the attention of newspapers in the area.

=== Ingersoll Christian Reformed Church ===
The church's original congregation came from the Netherlands in the mid-1850s. In 1955, a barn was renovated into a church on King Street. In 1973 the barn was sold and later burned in 1975. In 1976, the congregation decided to rebuild on 1.6 ha (4 ac) just west of the first church.

=== Peoples Revival Centre ===
In 1942, the congregation bought the collegiate gym and moved the complex to its present location.

=== Princess Elizabeth Community Centre ===
In 2012, Princess Elizabeth Public School was purchased by a charity named the Vedic Institute of Canada and has been converted to Vedic ashram or retreat centre.

=== Sacred Heart Roman Catholic Church ===
The congregation was established in 1838, served by missionaries. The first church, a wooden building, was built on John Street in 1850. It was raised to parish status in 1864. The brick church building on the corner of Thames Street North and Bell Street was built in 1879, it is one of the tallest structures in the town, and its interior contains numerous oil paintings and large stained-glass windows.

=== Salvation Army ===
The congregation was established in 1884 and the church was built in 1935.

=== St. James Anglican Church ===
On granting the township of Oxford-on-the-Thames to Thomas Ingersoll's associates in 1793, Governor Simcoe had hoped the new settlement would be led by the Rev. Gideon Bostwick (1742–1793), who had been ordained by the Bishop of London at St. James Palace in 1770 and by 1793 had a large and well-known missionary circuit extending many miles north, south and east from St. James Episcopal (Anglican) Church in Great Barrington, Massachusetts. (He had presided over each of Thomas Ingersoll's marriages there). Bostwick was named first amongst Thomas Ingersoll's associates, and his "well known suffering" for the church caused Simcoe to note him just the type who should be encouraged to settle here. Bostwick made strenuous preparations for the move but died suddenly from pneumonia before seeing his new home in Upper Canada. His sons and daughters made the move a few years later, and son Henry Bostwick (1782–1816) was appointed by Isaac Brock to command the Oxford Militia in the War of 1812. The Oxford settlement later hamlet of Ingersoll did not have a resident Anglican priest until 40 years after Gideon's death, although it was included on the bishop's occasional circuits through the province until then. The congregation was formally established in 1834 with the arrival of the Rev. John Rothwell (1797–1866), ordained following his graduation from Trinity College, Dublin. Rather than appointed by the bishop, Rothwell himself chose the hamlet of Ingersoll as his new home, purchasing farm land for his family and volunteering his services for the first five years without asking compensation, encouraging the congregation to concentrate instead on building a suitable first church for the community, using land donated by the Ingersolls on its highest hill (now the site of the senior citizens apartment building on Earl Street), finally completed and consecrated in 1840. The present church building on Oxford Street near the town hall was erected in 1868. The contractors were the Christopher Brothers.

=== St. Paul's Presbyterian Church ===
The congregation was established in 1846. It was originally named Knox Presbyterian until the union of a number of parishes – Knox, Erskine and St. Andrews – at what became St. Paul's in 1889. A fascinating description (available online) of the early days of the Knox congregation and the interplay between the Presbyterians, Baptists, Methodists and Anglicans in Ingersoll in the 1840s and 1850s was written by the son of the first pastor of Knox Church, Rev. Robert Wallace (1820–1897). The Presbyterian church sometimes drew followers who could not abide the "ranters" presiding at the other churches.

=== Trinity United Church ===
The United Church was formed in 1925 to complete the national movement underway for decades to unite Methodist, Presbyterian and Congregationalist churches across Canada. The Methodists were originally reformers in the Church of England (Anglican Church) in the 1700s who formed their own church movement when reforms were rejected. The earliest Methodist missionaries to the Oxford settlement came with permission from Thomas Ingersoll, who mourned the loss of Gideon Bostwick's evangelical powers, but saw the need for other forms of spiritual leadership. Two of his daughters eventually married Methodist missionaries. As the hamlet of Ingersoll grew in the 1820s, Methodists used the log schoolhouse on Oxford Street for worship, and shared it with the Anglicans when Rev. John Rothwell arrived in 1834. Two branches of the Methodists developed in the hamlet, each with its own church building by the 1850s (Episcopal Methodists on Charles Street at the foot of Oxford Street, and Wesleyan Methodists on Oxford Street across from the Town Hall). The original "Two Tower" church on King Street West was built in 1865 for the Wesleyans. With expansions over the years, it eventually became the home of both Methodist congregations along with some of the Presbyterians in the town. The three-portal entranceway that was added to it and the name Trinity were symbolic of the union.

== Sports history ==
=== Baseball ===
The New England settlers of Oxford-on-the-Thames brought with them an early version of the stick and ball game now known as baseball. This was played in the Great Barrington area in the 1790s, and was a part of the Queen's Birthday celebrations in pioneer Oxford, as immortalized in the writings of Dr. Ford which gave nearby Beachville its fame as the birthplace of baseball in Canada. By the 1860s a Canadian championship circuit had been developed from Oxford. Ingersoll's team took the title in 1868 and went on to display its prowess in matches against American teams in the 1870s. By the 1930s Ingersoll had a semi-pro team that recruited Oscar 'Lefty' Judd (1908–1995), a pitcher from Nissouri township who helped the team go on to the provincial championship before launching his career as a professional player in the United States.

=== Hockey ===
During the 1954-55 season, the Woodstock's Warriors recruited Bobby Hull for its Junior B team and went on to win the provincial championship. Ingersoll's Reems captured the Junior C provincial championship that same year, while Tillsonburg topped the Intermediate A ranks.

=== Cycling ===
When bicycling increased in popularity 1890s, completing a 'century' was a significant achievement, meaning completion of at least 100 miles of travel. Doug Carr (1910-1994) from Ingersoll made a round-the-world bicycle tour of over 60,000 miles from 1937 to 1939, followed by a speaking tour celebrating the feat, before settling into his career as a book and china store operator. The physical artifacts he saved are housed at the Ingersoll Cheese and Agricultural Museum; his diaries, photographs and papers from his years of adventure are at the Ontario Archives. An online archive has been created from a presentation at the HASTAC 2013 conference at York University, Toronto, and numerous other online summaries are available.

=== School athletics ===
Through much of the last century, the elementary schools in Ingersoll joined each year in presenting a May Festival program of dancing and singing for entertainment of parents at the town arena, and a Field Day program when all the schools paraded to Victoria Park for a day of athletic competitions on the playing fields in front of the covered grandstands. At the high school level, the school boards collaborated in organizing competitions between teams from all the high schools in the county. In 1958 this was expanded to create tri-county athletics championship competitions amongst the high schools of Oxford, Elgin and Norfolk counties, as a preliminary to determining entry in the Western Ontario Secondary School Athletics Association (WOSSAA) championship. When the school boards were merged to form the current Thames Valley District School Board in 1998, the tri-county competition was modified to include Oxford, Elgin and Middlesex as the championship series preliminary to WOSSAA. Ingersoll earned its first tri-county championship in football with a string of IDCI Blue Bombers senior team victories in 1968. The IDCI girls hockey team has reached the WOSSAA championship level three years in a row as of 2018. Rankings, standings and championship holders are all provided on the Thames Valley Regional Athletics website.

== Plaques and monuments ==
=== The Big Cheese ===
Located south of Ingersoll, at the Elm Hurst Inn, off Road 119, the first exit north of Highway 401 has a plaque that marks the site of James Harris's co-operative cheese factory, in which was constructed a giant 7,300-pound "Big Cheese." The mammoth cheddar was made in eight days and cured in three months in a specially built shed. In August 1866, the "Big Cheese" was transported on a modified wagon by six horses to the train station in Ingersoll. It was exhibited at the New York State Fair in Saratoga and then shipped to England, where it was bought by a Liverpool merchant.

=== First cheese factory ===
Located at the Ingersoll Post Office, a historical plaque commemorates the establishment of the first cheese factory in Canada near the Oxford County village of Norwich in 1864. The rapid, widespread adoption of the co-operative factory system across Ontario marked the beginning of the modern dairy industry in Canada. The Canadian Dairymen's Association was founded in Ingersoll in 1867.

=== Founders of Ingersoll ===
Located on the south east corner of the Thames Street bridge. Commemorates Major Thomas Ingersoll and his son Charles who were responsible for the first major settlement of the Townships of East, West and North Oxford and who founded the community of Ingersoll in 1793.

=== Site of Thomas Ingersoll's log cabin ===
This plaque, situated on a pavilion, marks the former location of Thomas Ingersoll's log cabin, circa 1795. Located between 131 and 147 Thames Street, Ingersoll.

=== The old town halls and the present-day one ===
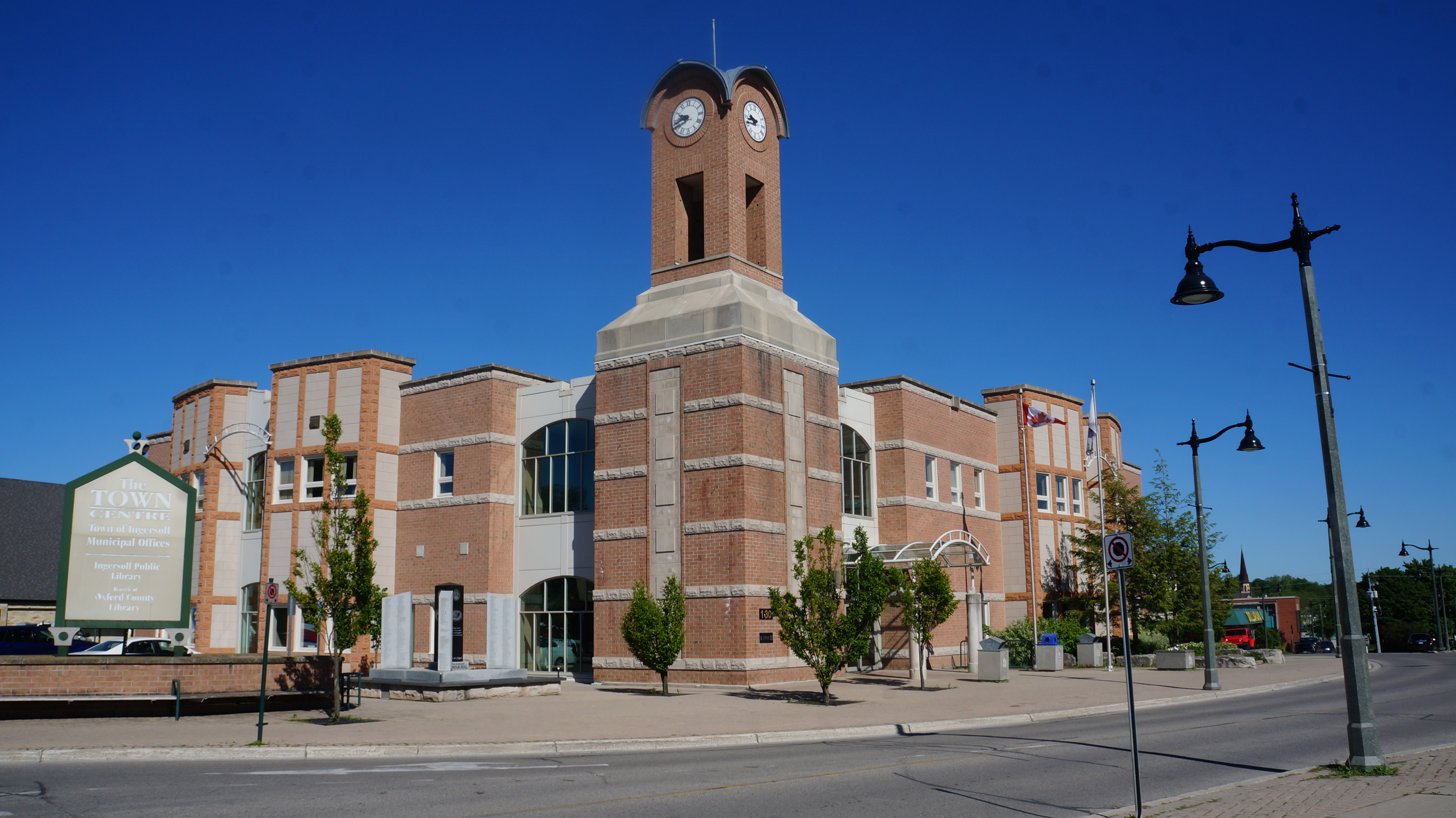
Ingersoll Town Hall in 2017

The original market house and town hall, constructed of wood in 1853 on the southeast corner of King and Oxford streets, was destroyed by fire in April 1856. The village council replaced it with a brick building in 1857, at a cost of £2,700, and paid £8 15s to have its image displayed on Tremaine's 1857 Map of Oxford County. The town demolished that building in 1990 and replaced it with the present-day town hall, on the southwest corner of King and Oxford streets. A Saturday-morning farmer's market operates seasonally on the town hall square, situated on original site of the town hall. An historical plaque marking the second building vanished with its demolition.

== Notable people ==
- Elizabeth 'Betty' Gardner Taylor, (1916–1977), born in Ingersoll. A track and field specialist in the 80-metre hurdles. The bronze medallist at the 1936 Berlin Olympics. Also competed in the 1932 Los Angeles games. A silver medallist at the 1934 British Empire Games and the 1934 Women's World Games.
- Edward A. Bott, born April 11, 1887, near Ingersoll, Ontario, Canada. was a notable Canadian psychologist and academic, particularly active during the early to mid-20th century. He worked at the University of Toronto and was known for his contributions to the study of psychology, particularly in the area of mental hygiene. He collaborated with William Blatz and was involved in treating shell-shocked veterans post-World War I. Bott also played a significant role in the development of child psychology and educational psychology in Canada.
- Aimee Semple McPherson, (1890–1944). Born Aimee Kennedy on a farm near Salford. Raised in the Salvation Army barracks, Ingersoll. Converted at a Pentecostal revival in Ingersoll, and at age 17 married Robert Semple, a Pentecostal exhorter. The couple left Ingersoll for the mission fields in China, where her husband died. Then she remarried to an American, Harold McPherson – whence her name, Aimee Semple McPherson. Based in Los Angeles, she prospered as a radio evangelist and founder of the Foursquare network of churches. The premier woman evangelist of her time, sensational in preaching, controversial in her family life.
- Alfred Lucking (1856–1929), James Thompson McCleary (1853–1924), and Frank McDonough (1846–1904) were "Ingersoll Old Boys" who made good in the United States. In 1904 Lucking was a Democratic Congressman for Detroit, Michigan; McCleary was a Republican Congressman for Minnesota, and McDonough was a Wisconsin State Senator. On meeting each other on the floor of Congress, Lucking and McCleary discovered that they had been born within two blocks of each other, in Ingersoll. "Forty years ago," recalled McCleary, who had been educated in the Ingersoll high school, "I knew and was known by nearly every person in Ingersoll … my native town." Lucking, not so much: his parents removed to Michigan when he was aged two. McDonough had removed to Wisconsin at age 17.
- David Manicom (b. 1960), Canadian author Manicom's The Burning Eaves (2003) was a finalist for the 2004 Governor General's Awards for English Language Poetry, while "Progeny of Ghosts" (1998) won the Quebec Writer's Federation prize for non-fiction[4] and was short-listed for the National Writer's Trust Viacom award for non-fiction.
- Mark Hominick (b. 1982), mixed martial artist, former TKO Major League MMA Featherweight Champion, and retired UFC fighter
- Alanson Harris (1816–1894), worked on his father's bush farm and attended school in Ingersoll. With his father, established a saw mill in Brant County, 1841, then bought a foundry and manufactured agricultural implements in Beamsville, 1857. Moved his business to Brantford, 1872. Continued to visit his family members in Ingersoll. Merged with three other companies to form the Massey-Harris Company, 1891. Died 1894.
- Ken Armstrong (b. 1953). Born Ingersoll 12 October 1953, son of Huck and Ruth Armstrong. Canadian Olympic diver at Montreal Olympics, 1976, and Moscow Olympics, 1980. Coach of Canadian national team, 1984, and US national team, Sydney 2000.
- George Hayes (1914–1987). Born in Montreal but grew up in Ingersoll. NHL linesman, 1945–65. The first linesman to work 1,000 games. Elected (posthumously) to the NHL Hockey Hall of Fame in 1988. Retired in Ingersoll to a second career as local sports bard.
- Richard Pennefather Rothwell (1836–1901), civil, mechanical, mining engineer, famous as an author, editor, publisher and organizer who tirelessly promoted improved engineering standards in the mining industry. Born in Ingersoll, the son of Rev. John Rothwell.
- Ella Shelton (b. 1998), Canadian professional ice hockey player for the Toronto Sceptres of the Professional Women's Hockey League (PWHL). Shelton scored the first goal in PWHL history for PWHL New York on January 1, 2024, against PWHL Toronto. A member of the Canadian national team, she won gold at the 2022 Winter Olympics and multiple IIHF Women's World Championships. She is set to represent Canada at the 2026 Winter Olympics.

== See also ==
- List of townships in Ontario
