= Thomas Ingersoll =

Early Canadian settler

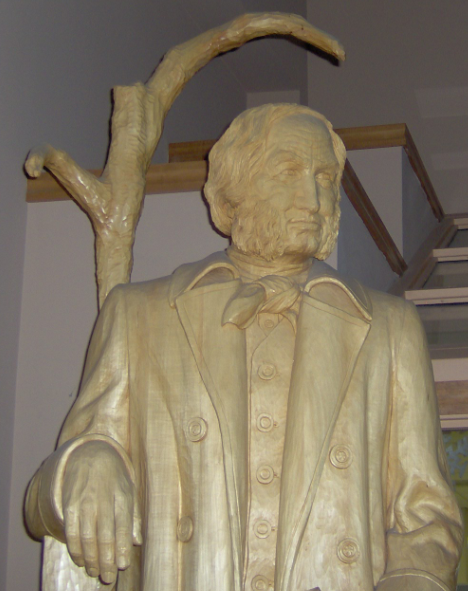
- Statue of Thomas Ingersoll at the Ingersoll Town Hall
- Born: 1749; Westfield, Massachusetts
- Died: 1812; Port Credit, Ontario
- Spouse(s): Elizabeth Dewey (1775–1784); Mercy Smith; Sarah Whiting
- Children: Laura Secord; Charles Fortescue Ingersoll

Thomas Ingersoll (1749–1812) was an early settler in Upper Canada, later Ontario. He is best known as the father of Laura Secord, who warned the British of an impending American attack on Upper Canada during the War of 1812.

He was born in Westfield, Massachusetts, later moving to Great Barrington where, aside from his trade as a hatter, he also served as constable and tax collector. In 1775, he married Elizabeth Dewey. He served as a lieutenant in the American militia from 1777 to 1781 and continued to serve in the Great Barrington militia after the American Revolution, reaching the rank of major. After the death of his first wife in 1784, when Laura (his eldest daughter) was eight, he married Mercy Smith, the widow of Josiah Smith. After the death of his second wife, he married Sarah Whiting, the widow of John Backus, in 1789.

Ingersoll emigrated to Upper Canada after hearing about the availability of land there for new settlers. In 1793, he obtained a land grant of 66,000 acres (267 km^{2}) in Oxford County from Governor John Graves Simcoe. He named the new settlement Oxford-on-the-Thames. Ingersoll was named a justice of the peace for the county.

By November 1795, Ingersoll had once again uprooted, moving to Queenston, Upper Canada and operating one of the earliest taverns before putting it up for sale in 1801.

In 1806, he left the settlement at Oxford-on-the-Thames and settled on the Credit River near Port Credit, operating "Government House" (also as "Government Inn") until his death in 1812.

His son Charles renamed Oxford-on-the-Thames "Ingersoll" in his honor.
