= Charles Fortescue Ingersoll =

Canadian politician

Charles Fortescue Ingersoll (September 27, 1791 – August 18, 1832) was a businessman and political figure in Upper Canada.

He was born in Great Barrington, Massachusetts in 1791, the son of Thomas Ingersoll and younger half-brother of Laura Ingersoll (later Laura Secord). The family moved to Upper Canada in 1795. He began work as a clerk for merchants at Queenston. Ingersoll served as lieutenant in a troop of dragoons during the War of 1812. In 1816, he married Anna Maria, the sister of William Hamilton Merritt who was captain in the same unit and became Ingersoll's partner in business after the war. Ingersoll helped found the town of Ingersoll which he named after his father. With his brother James, he built a sawmill, gristmill, potash plant and distillery there, also establishing a general store and serving as postmaster. Ingersoll also became lieutenant-colonel in the local militia and served as justice of the peace for the London District. He was elected to the Legislative Assembly of Upper Canada for Oxford County in 1824 and 1830; serving in the 9th Parliament and 11th Parliament respectively.

He died of cholera in 1832, while still in office.

His eldest daughter married James Rea Benson, who served in the Canadian House of Commons and Senate.
