= Richard P. Rothwell =

Canadian-American engineer

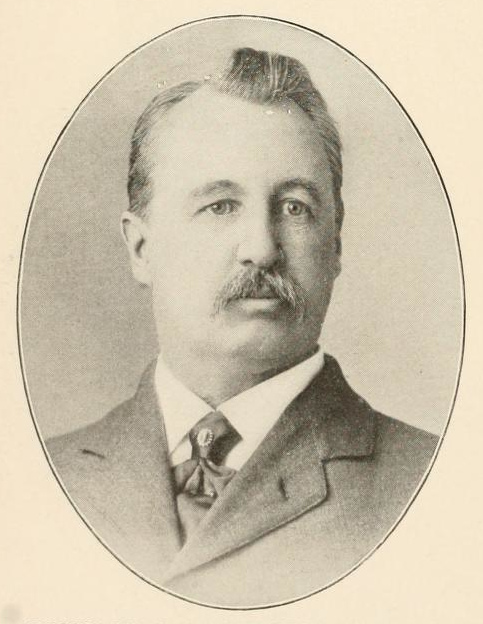
- Born: May 1, 1836; Ingersoll, Upper Canada
- Died: April 17, 1901 (aged 64); New York, New York
- Education: Trinity College; Rensselaer Institute; École nationale supérieure des mines de Paris
- Occupation: Engineer
- Spouse: Bertha Hillebrand (m. 1862)

Richard Pennefather Rothwell (May 1, 1836 – April 17, 1901) was a Canadian-American civil, mechanical and mining engineer. He was the co-founder of the American Institute of Mining Engineers, and was awarded the gold medal at the Paris Exposition, in 1898, by the Soeiete d'Encouragement pour l'Industrie Nationale de France, as founder and editor of The Mineral Industry.

== Early life and education ==
Richard Pennefather Rothwell was born May 1, 1836, at Ingersoll, Upper Canada. He studied in early life at Trinity College, Toronto, the Rensselaer Institute at Troy, New York, and the École nationale supérieure des mines de Paris.

== Career ==
His professional practice in France and England, and his subsequent career as civil, mechanical and mining engineer in Pennsylvania, from the year 1866 to 1873, prepared him for his later work as editor, writer and manager of statistical and scientific publications. Rothwell already was known as an accomplished writer on engineering and mining topics when, in 1874 he became an editor, and afterward the owner of The Engineering and Mining Journal.

Later, he formed The Scientific Publishing Company, which in 1893 began the publication of The Mineral Industry, an annual intended to cover worldwide mineral production along with developments in mining and metallurgical processes. Rothwell regarded this publication as his crowning work, and contributed extensively to the revision and selection of the journal's' articles. His editorial contributions to the publication are cited to have uplifted the quality and prestige of The Mineral Industry within the scope of contemporary technical literature.

Rothwell was one of the three founders of the American Institute of Mining Engineers. He was awarded the gold medal at the Paris Exposition, in 1898, by the Soeiete d'Encouragement pour l'Industrie Nationale de France, as editor of The Mineral Industry.

He organized The Sophia Fund, which was incorporated in May 1900, as a memorial to his long-time employee, Sophia Braeunlich, with a donation of about US$25,000, a part of which was contributed from moneys left by Braeunlich.

== Personal life ==
Rothwell married Bertha Hillebrand in 1862.

He died at his residence in New York City, on April 17, 1901.
