= USS Ingersoll (DD-652) =

Fletcher-class destroyer

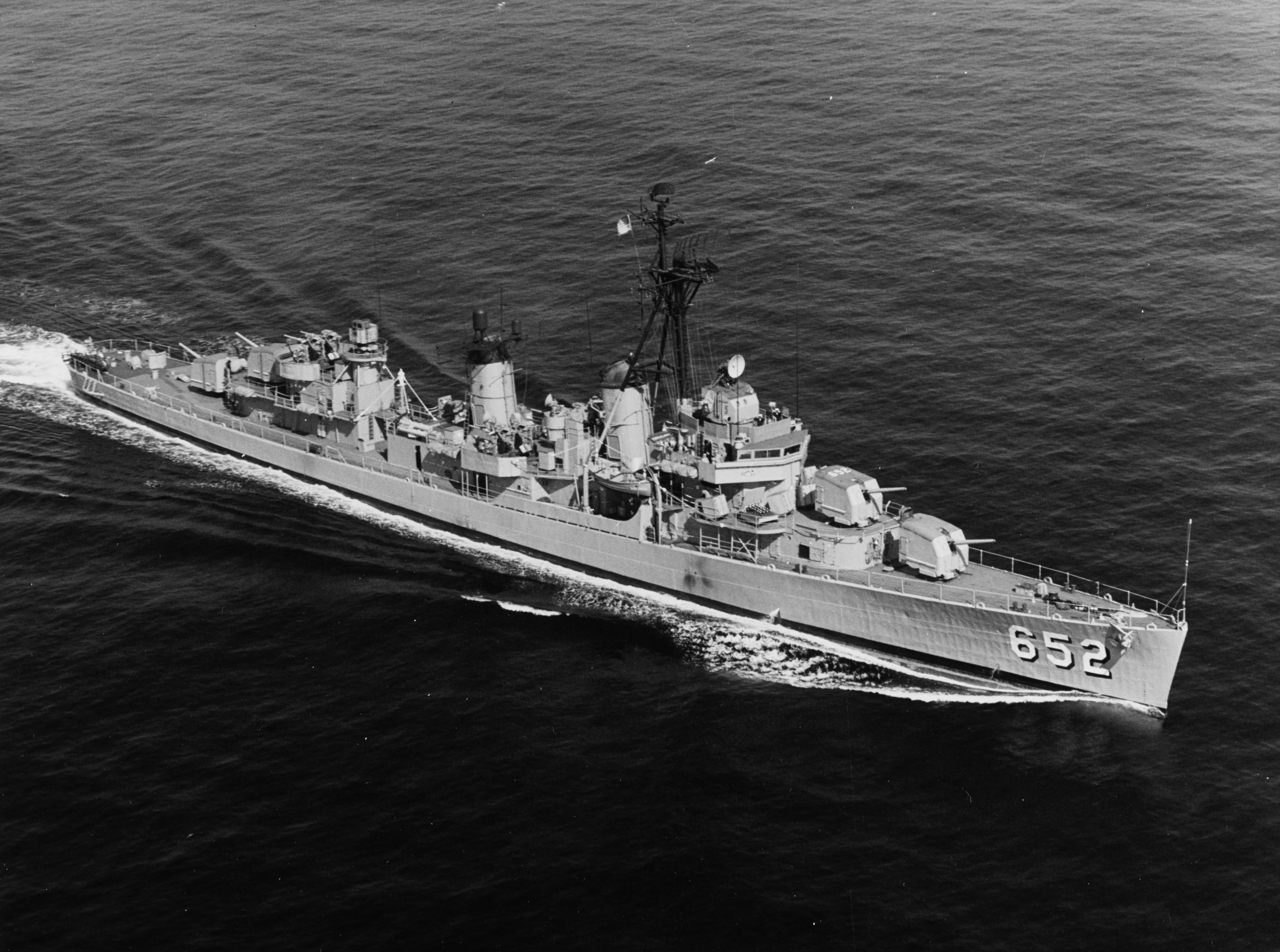
- USS Ingersoll (DD-652) in 1966

History

United States
- Namesake: Royal R. Ingersoll
- Builder: Bath Iron Works
- Laid down: 18 February 1943
- Launched: 28 June 1943
- Commissioned: 31 August 1943 to 19 July 1946; 4 May 1951 to 20 January 1970
- Stricken: 20 January 1970
- Motto: "Ready Now"
- Fate: Sunk as a target, 19 May 1974

General characteristics
- Class & type: Fletcher-class destroyer
- Displacement: 2,050 tons
- Length: 376 ft 6 in (114.7 m)
- Beam: 39 ft 8 in (12.1 m)
- Draft: 17 ft 9 in (5.4 m)
- Installed power: 60,000 shp (45 MW)
- Propulsion: 2 propellers
- Speed: 35 knots (65 km/h; 40 mph)
- Range: 6500 nmi. (12,000 km); at 15 kt
- Complement: 319
- Armament: 5 × 5 in (130 mm), 4 × 40 mm AA guns, 4 × 20 mm AA guns, 10 × 21 inch (533 mm) torpedo tubes, 6 × depth charge projectors, 2 × depth charge tracks

USS Ingersoll (DD-652) was a Fletcher-class destroyer in the United States Navy, serving from 28 June 1943 through 19 May 1974. Ingersoll saw action mainly in the Pacific Ocean Areas during World War II, and during the Korean War and Vietnam Wars.

== Namesakes ==
Ingersoll was named for Admiral Royal R. Ingersoll, former Chief of Staff of the Atlantic Fleet in the early 20th century, and his grandson Lieutenant Royal R. Ingersoll II.

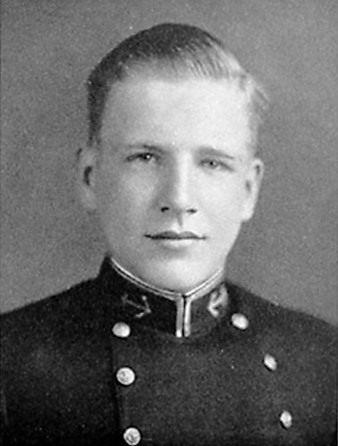
Royal Rodney Ingersoll II

Royal Rodney Ingersoll II was born on 17 December 1913 in Manila, Philippines, and he was the son of Admiral Royal E. Ingersoll, and the grandson of Rear Admiral Royal R. Ingersoll. After graduating from the United States Naval Academy in 1934, he served on the battleship USS California and the destroyer USS Cassin. He reported on board the aircraft carrier USS Hornet during its fitting-out (pre-commissioning) period in 1941 and served on the Hornet during the famous Doolittle Raid on Tokyo in April 1942, the Hornet's maiden combat voyage.

He was killed during the Battle of Midway by machine gun fire from a crippled F4F Wildcat fighter from the USS Yorktown which was making an emergency landing on board the Hornet. Its wounded pilot was either unable to, or failed to, cut off its guns. Four enlisted men were also killed and 20 more sailors were wounded in this accident.

== History ==
USS Ingersoll was launched by Bath Iron Works Corp., Bath, Maine, 28 June 1942. She was co-sponsored by Miss Alice Jean Ingersoll, granddaughter of the Admiral, and Mrs. R. R. Ingersoll, II, widow of Lieutenant Royal R. Ingersoll II. Ingersoll was commissioned at the Boston Navy Yard on 31 August 1943.

=== World War II ===
Ingersoll conducted shakedown training off Bermuda during September and October 1943, and returned to Boston to embark Admiral Royal E. Ingersoll, Commander in Chief of the Atlantic Fleet, son of the first namesake and father of the second, for a fleet review, 10 November 1943. The ship sailed 29 November to join the Pacific Fleet; and, after stops at the Panama Canal and San Diego, arrived at Pearl Harbor 21 December. There she joined Task Force 58 for the invasion of the Marshall Islands.

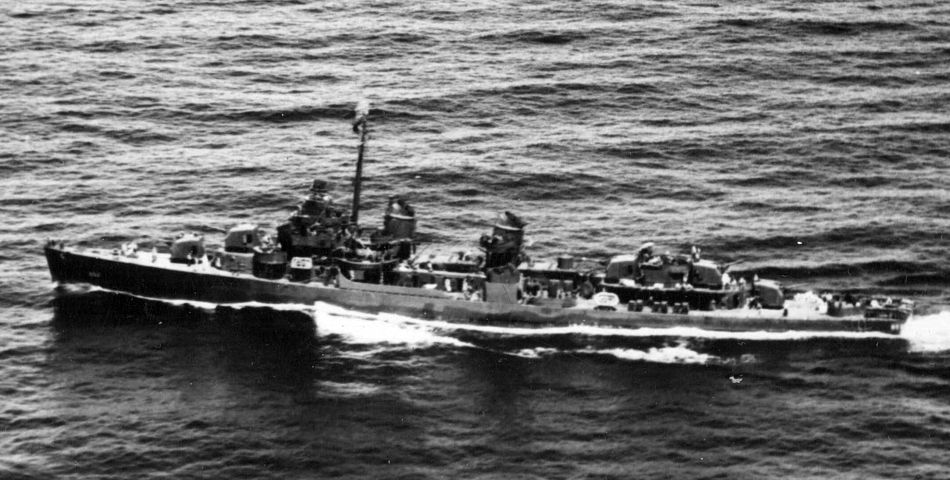
Ingersoll operating in the Marshall Islands, 27 January 1944.

The destroyer departed 16 January with the Southern Bombardment Group, and began preinvasion firing on Kwajalein 30 January. The landings began next day with Ingersoll lying offshore in her support role. She retired to Majuro on 5 February, but was underway again 16 February to screen the fast carrier forces in their raid on Truk from 17 to 18 February. After air strikes in the Marianas, Ingersoll returned with the carriers to Majuro 26 February. Then on 7 March the destroyer sailed for Espiritu Santo, New Hebrides, but soon returned to Task Force 58 for carrier strikes against the Palaus and Hollandia. In the months that followed, the ships hit Pohnpei twice with shore bombardments and screened carrier strikes in the Palaus in connection with the advance of American combined forces.

Ingersoll took part in preinvasion bombardments of Peleliu on 7 September, and early in October joined Task Force 38. The fleet rendezvoused on 7 October west of the Marianas, and launched air strikes on Okinawa and the Philippines. The ships then moved to their real objective— Japanese air strength on Formosa. In 3 days of attacks Formosa's value as a base was severely reduced, while air strikes on the U.S. fleet were repulsed by Combat Air Patrol and the gunfire of Ingersoll and her sister ships. The carrier groups turned southward from Formosa to launch strikes against targets in the Philippines.

In late October, the Japanese moved in a three-pronged attack to repel the invasion of the Philippines to force a decisive naval battle. The ensuing battle was the four-part Battle of Leyte Gulf, in which Ingersoll and her task group also took part. When Admiral Halsey detached part of his fleet southward to intercept Japanese ships off Samar on 25 October 1944, Ingersoll joined Admiral Dubose's task group in pursuit of the fleeing remnants of the Japanese fleet. During the long stern chase Ingersoll fired one torpedo at long range, but the group did not engage the remaining Japanese heavy ships.

Ingersoll returned to Ulithi for a rest and overhaul. She got underway again in January 1945 with fast carrier forces for strikes on Formosa, the Philippines, and the coast of China. From 3 to 9 January these operations supported the invasion of Lingayen Gulf. The fast carrier force then operated in the South China Sea, striking Indochina, Hainan, and the China coast. This operation was completed 20 January; Ingersoll was detached 1 February to sail to Pearl Harbor. She arrived 7 February, and after training exercises steamed to San Pedro, California, on 15 February 1945.

Following battle repairs and crew rotation, Ingersoll got underway for Pearl Harbor 18 April 1945 and after training exercises sailed for Ulithi 2 May. From that staging base she steamed toward Okinawa, serving as a patrol vessel and screening flight operations. While off Okinawa on 24 May 1945, the ship engaged a small suicide boat, and next day she shot down two Japanese aircraft during one of many air raids. Two more planes were shot down on 28 May, and Ingersoll continued the patrol and picket duty through June 1945.

After Okinawa was secured, the ship rejoined Task Force 38 on 1 July 1945. Again acting as a screening and support ship, she took part in the final raids on Japan and other Japanese-held islands. She also bombarded the iron works at Kamaishi on 15 July as part of a battleship, cruiser, and destroyer group in one of the first operations against the Japanese home islands by surface ships.

After the surrender of Japan on 15 August, Ingersoll assisted with the occupation of Japan; she was anchored in Tokyo Bay for the surrender ceremonies on board USS Missouri (BB-63) on 2 September 1945. The destroyer remained in Japan to help demilitarize Japanese bases, departing 5 December for the United States. After a long voyage via San Diego and the Canal Zone, she arrived Boston on 17 January 1946. She then sailed to Charleston, South Carolina on 4 April 1946 and was decommissioned 19 July 1946. Ingersoll then joined the Atlantic Reserve Fleet.

=== Cold War ===
The destroyer recommissioned at Charleston on 4 May 1951 in response to the growing need for naval support during the Korean War. Ingersoll operated along the Atlantic Coast and in the Caribbean until departing for the Mediterranean on 26 August 1952 to join the 6th Fleet. She operated in the Mediterranean Sea until returning to Newport, Rhode Island on 10 February 1953.

Training operations occupied Ingersoll until she departed Newport for the Far East on 10 August. Sailing via the Panama Canal, San Diego, and Pearl Harbor, she arrived Yokosuka, Japan, 14 September to begin operations with Task Force 77 off Korea. The ships sailed off Korea in support of the armistice, before moving to the Formosa area in November–December. Ingersoll then sailed to Singapore and steamed westward to transit the Suez Canal on 13 February 1954. After stopping at various Mediterranean ports she completed her circuit of the globe upon arrival at Fall River, Massachusetts on 18 March 1954.

Following repairs and training, the ship got underway again 30 November 1954 for the Pacific, arriving San Diego 15 December and departing 4 January 1955. She rejoined the 7th Fleet in time to take part in the evacuation of the Tachen Islands, which threatened to bring war between Chinese Nationalists and Communists. After fleet maneuvers, the ship spent March and April at Formosa helping to train Nationalist sailors. Ingersoll returned to San Diego on 19 June 1955.

The destroyer returned to 7th Fleet duty January to April 1956; and, after her return to San Diego 26 April, engaged in training operations until August. From 27 August to 8 December, Ingersoll underwent a yard period in San Francisco in which a new underwater fire control system was installed. After additional evaluation and antisubmarine training, the ship sailed again on 16 April 1957 for the western Pacific. On this cruise, Ingersoll stopped at Melbourne, Australia, and the Fiji Islands, participating in fleet exercises off Guam and the Philippines. In August, the destroyer steamed to Taiwan for the Formosa Patrol, helping to maintain peace and stability in those waters. After carrier exercises she sailed for home, arriving San Diego on 14 October 1957.

Ingersoll returned to the Far East with the 7th Fleet 25 June to 18 December 1958; and, in the early part of 1959, took part in type training and readiness operations off California. The ship sailed westward once more on 15 August 1959 and operated with a submarine hunter-killer group during most of her deployment. She returned to San Diego on 1 February 1960. The destroyer got underway with a hunter-killer group for the Far East on 1 October 1960, and after spending October and November training in Hawaiian waters steamed to the South China Sea to support American efforts to stabilize the threatened Kingdom of Laos. In December, she screened transports during the landing of a battalion landing team in Laos to enforce the Geneva solution. She remained off Laos until April, returning to her home port 2 May 1961.

Ingersoll spent the remainder of 1961 on the West Coast, then sailed 6 January 1962 for duty with the 7th Fleet that included operations with the carrier USS Hancock (CVA-19) off South Vietnam. She also patrolled Taiwan Straits in response to the reports of Communist troops on the mainland opposite the Nationalist island. She returned to San Diego 18 July 1962 for western seaboard operations until October 1962 when the Cuban Missile Crisis broke. Ingersoll sailed with an amphibious group to the Canal Zone in case additional troops were needed in the emergency. When the sea blockade coupled with diplomacy resulted in the removal of the missile threat, she resumed training out of San Diego. She returned to the Far East in October 1963 to support carrier operations in the East and South China Seas and resumed operations out of San Diego in the spring of 1964.

=== Vietnam War ===
Ingersoll completed a yard overhaul 5 February 1965, conducted readiness operations along the seaboard, then sailed from San Diego 9 June 1965 for the coast of South Vietnam. Her duty were mainly Market Time patrols to intercept Viet Cong men and supplies, but she was also called upon for 24 gunfire missions against 116 targets along the Vietnamese coast, and 3 missions 12 km up the Saigon River. She operated with the aircraft carriers for plane guard and screen duties, including USS Independence (CVA-62) and USS Midway (CVA-41). She returned to San Diego 23 November 1965 for a much deserved leave and upkeep period extending through 31 December.

Ingersoll completed yard overhaul 5 February 1965 and immediately began training for a WestPac deployment. She sailed for the Far East 9 June and on 5 July 1965 began coastal surveillance patrols. On the 20th she joined the naval gunfire support group off the coast of Quang Ngai. On 10 October she was assigned to plane guard duty in the South China Sea. On 4 November she headed home and arrived at San Diego on 23 November 1965. Ingersoll operated along the West Coast until departing San Diego 5 November 1966 for the Far East. Upon reaching the war zone she participated in Operation Sea Dragon, anti-shipping and interdiction operations, and plane guard duty for USS Kitty Hawk (CVA-63). On 5 December, a North Vietnamese coastal battery fired on the destroyer whose counter fire silenced the enemy guns. Ingersoll continued to operate in the war zone and other Oriental waters until returning home in the spring of 1967.

The ship was deployed for her final deployment in 1968 to the Vietnamese coast where her task was to interdict materiel and supplies headed from North Vietnam to South Vietnam. This would mark the last time her guns were fired in anger.

For service during the Korean and Vietnam eras, Ingersoll and eligible personnel earned the Europe bar for the previously awarded Navy Occupation Medal, the China Service Medal, the National Defense Medal (with one bronze star - two awards, Korea and Vietnam), the Korean Service Medal, the Vietnam Service Medal (original award with three battle stars), the Republic of Korea Presidential Unit Citation, the RVN Gallantry Cross, the United Nations Service Medal (Korea), and the RVN Campaign Medal.

Ingersoll was decommissioned on 20 January 1970 at the U.S. Naval Station in San Diego.

She was sunk as a target at 33°34′8″N 118°34′7″W on 19 May 1974.
