= Royal E. Ingersoll =

United States Navy four-star admiral

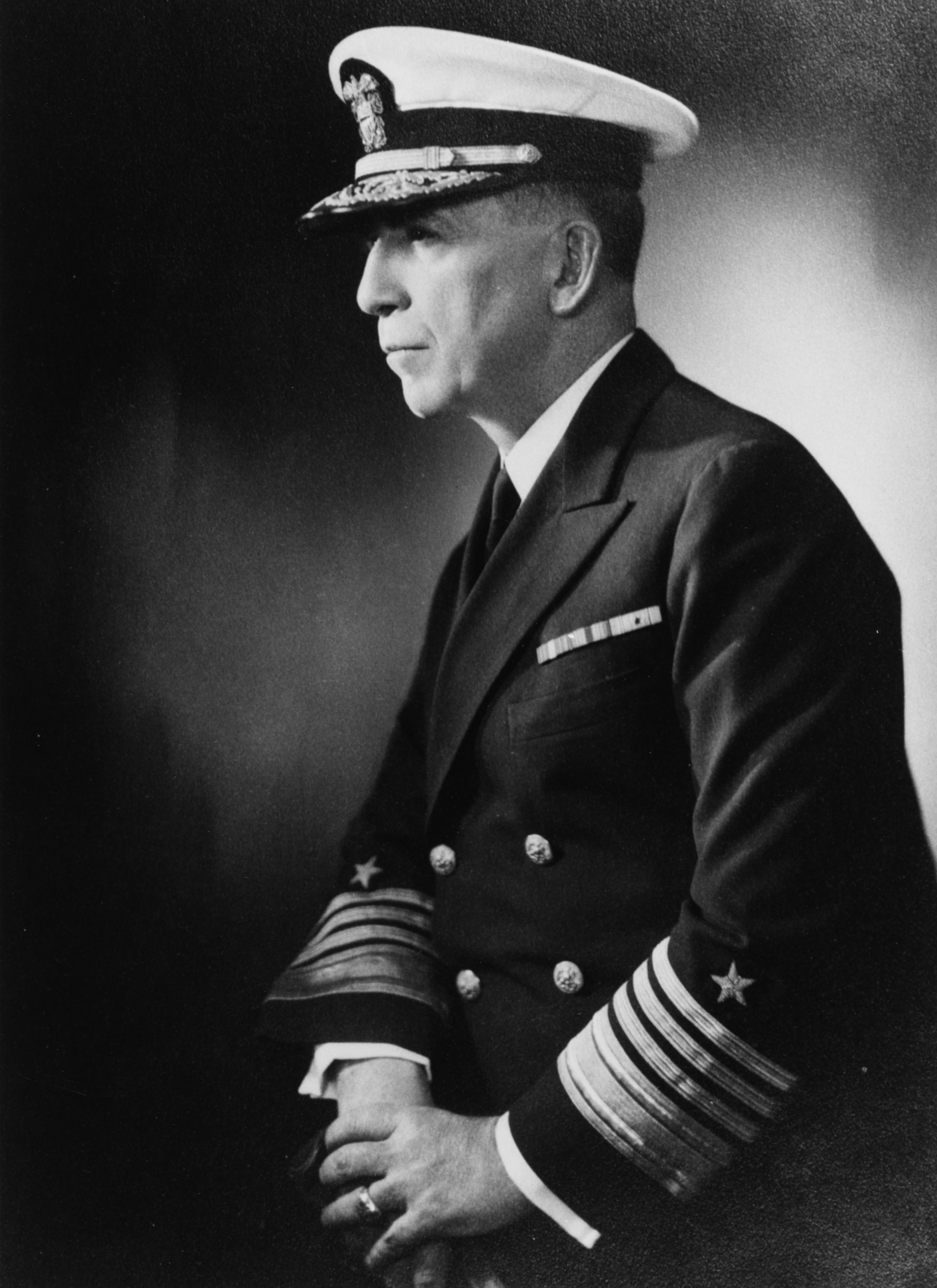
- Admiral Royal E. Ingersoll
- Born: 20 June 1883; Washington, D.C., US
- Died: 20 May 1976 (aged 92); Bethesda, Maryland, US
- Burial place: Pine Lake Cemetery, La Porte, Indiana, US
- Relatives: Royal R. Ingersoll (father); Royal R. Ingersoll II (son)
- Military career
- Allegiance: United States
- Branch: United States Navy
- Service years: 1905–1946
- Rank: Admiral
- Commands: Western Sea Frontier; Atlantic Fleet
- Conflicts: World War I; World War II
- Awards: Navy Cross

Royal Eason Ingersoll (20 June 1883 – 20 May 1976) was a United States Navy four-star admiral who served as Commander in Chief, U.S. Atlantic Fleet (CINCLANT) from January 1, 1942 to late 1944; Commander, Western Sea Frontier from late 1944 to 1946; and Deputy Commander in Chief, U.S. Fleet/Deputy Chief of Naval Operations (DCOMINCH/DCNO) from late 1944 to late 1945.

Ingersoll was born in Washington, D.C., on 20 June 1883. He was second in a succession of three generations of U.S. Naval officers: his father, Rear Admiral Royal R. Ingersoll - United States Naval Academy class of 1868, and his son, Lieutenant Royal Rodney Ingersoll II - USNA class of 1934, was killed in a friendly fire accident on board the aircraft carrier Hornet (CV-8) on 4 June 1942, during the naval Battle of Midway.

== 1905–1937 ==
Ingersoll graduated from the Naval Academy in 1905, along with Chester W. Nimitz, and reported as a passed midshipman to the battleship Missouri (BB-11). In August of that year, he was one of the young officers assigned special temporary duty to attend the Russian-Japanese Peace Conference, held at the Portsmouth Naval Shipyard, in Kittery, Maine. When detached from the Missouri in May 1906, he was assigned briefly to the Marietta (PG-15), and later the Hancock (AP-3), then assisted in fitting out the Connecticut (BB-18) at the New York Navy Yard. He served on board that battleship from her commissioning on 29 September 1906, until October 1907.

Ingersoll served as an instructor of Seamanship and International Law, and later of English, at the Naval Academy between 1911 and 1913, preceding his assignment to the Asiatic Squadron. There he joined the armored cruiser Saratoga (ACR-2), the flagship of the U.S. Asiatic Fleet. He served briefly as her First Lieutenant, and then he became the Aide and Flag Lieutenant to the Chief-of-Staff of the Asiatic Fleet's Commander.

He returned to the United States, and on 1 June 1916, reported as Assistant for Communications, and Communication Officer, in the Office of the Chief of Naval Operations, Navy Department. Concerning that assignment, he subsequently wrote: "The work in this office began to pick up as the tension in the diplomatic relations with Germany increased, and overwhelmed us on 2 February 1917, when diplomatic relations with that country were broken...." For organizing the greatly expanded Naval Communications Office during World War I, he was awarded the Navy Cross and cited "for distinguished service in the line of his profession in organizing, developing, and administering the Communication Office of the Navy Department."

After the Armistice in November 1918, he was ordered to join Admiral William S. Benson, USN, then Chief of Naval Operations, concerning the establishment of a communication office for that commission. In February 1919, he returned home in the George Washington with the Presidential party, handling messages for President Woodrow Wilson on the voyage across the Atlantic.

In March 1919 he again joined the Connecticut, serving this time as her executive officer until September 1920, then transferring to the Arizona (BB-39). In June 1921, he reported to the Navy Department for a tour of duty in the Office of Naval Intelligence, and on 26 March 1924, assumed command of the Nokomis (SP-609). Under his command, that gunboat was fitted out as a survey ship and cruised in the Cuban–Haitian area, making new charts of the north coast of Cuba.

Completing the Senior Course at the Naval War College in Newport, Rhode Island in June 1927, he served the following year as a member of that staff. In June 1928, he reported for duty as Assistant Chief of Staff to Commander Battle Fleet, in the California (BB-44) and continued similar duty on the Staff when Admiral William V. Pratt became Commander in Chief, United States Fleet, with his flag in the Texas (BB-35). In August 1930, he was assigned to the Division of Fleet Training, Office of the Chief of Naval Operations, Navy Department, where he served until May 1933. He then reported as Commanding Officer of the heavy cruiser Augusta (CA-31), and in November 1933, was transferred to the Mare Island Naval Shipyard to fit out the San Francisco (CA-38). He commanded this cruiser from her commissioning on 10 February 1934 until June 1935.

The following three years of duty in the Office of the Chief of Naval Operations, as Director of the War Plans Division, included his assignment in June 1936 as Technical Assistant to the American Delegation at the London Naval Conference in 1935 – 36. He again went to London in December 1937, concerned with requirements growing out of the London Naval Treaty limiting naval armament.

== 1938-1946 ==
On 16 July 1938, Ingersoll took command of Cruiser Division Six of the Scouting Force, his flag in the cruiser Minneapolis (CA-36). Two years later, he returned to the Office of the Chief of Naval Operations as assistant to the Chief, and on 1 January 1942, with the rank of Vice Admiral, he was designated Commander in Chief, U.S. Atlantic Fleet, with the Augusta as his flagship.

Ingersoll was promoted to the rank of admiral on the following 1 July and broke his flag on the converted yacht USS Vixen (PG-53) on 17 July. Having organized the movements of the thousands of ships across the Atlantic to have men and supplies on hand at the precise hour for the North African landings in November 1942, he also had the responsibility of planning the composition of the naval escort forces which insured the troop convoys' safe arrival.

Following the African invasion, the Atlantic Fleet was employed in running troop convoys and transporting stores, munitions, and fuel to the United Kingdom and the Mediterranean. As a subsidiary responsibility, it ran the convoys on the coast of Brazil and continuously waged the anti-submarine war which had been a matter of primary concern since the outbreak of hostilities. Ingersoll is generally credited with solving the U-boat and Atlantic logistics problems. In addition, he had the responsibility of defense of the Western Hemisphere by U.S. naval forces and made changes in the disposition of air and surface forces stationed at various points in North and South America. For his services in this command, he was awarded the Distinguished Service Medal and cited as a "forceful and resolute leader under the critical conditions existing throughout a period of approximately three years... against a determined and ruthless enemy intent on world domination..."

In November 1944, he was detached from command of the Atlantic Fleet and became Commander Western Sea Frontier, with headquarters at San Francisco. In addition to commanding the naval forces engaged in protecting shipping in coastal waters, he managed the flow of supplies to the Pacific Fleet through West Coast ports. In carrying out this assignment, he had the status of a Deputy Commander in Chief, U.S. Fleet, and Deputy Chief of Naval Operations. After the reorganization of the navy in October 1945, he continued to serve as Commander Western Sea Frontier until 10 April 1946, when he was relieved of all active duty pending his retirement that became official on 1 August 1946.

== Family ==
Ingersoll was married in 1910 to Louise Van Harlingen of Atlanta, Georgia and had two children. Ingersoll died on 20 May 1976. In 1979, Mrs. Louise Ingersoll was the sponsor for USS Ingersoll (DD-990); their daughter, Alice Jean Ingersoll Nagle, acting as proxy sponsor. Their son, Royal Rodney II, had been (with Admiral Ingersoll's father) the namesake of the USS Ingersoll (DD-652).

== Awards ==
In addition to the Navy Cross and the Distinguished Service Medal, Ingersoll was awarded the World War I Victory Medal; the American Defense Service Medal; European-African-Middle Eastern Campaign Medal; and the World War II Victory Medal. He was also awarded the Chevalier of the Legion of Honor by the French Government, the Order of Naval Merit (Grand Cross) by the Government of Brazil and the Grand Officer of the Order of Orange Nassau with Swords by the Government of The Netherlands.
