= Royal R. Ingersoll =

Rear Admiral in the United States Navy

Royal Rodney Ingersoll
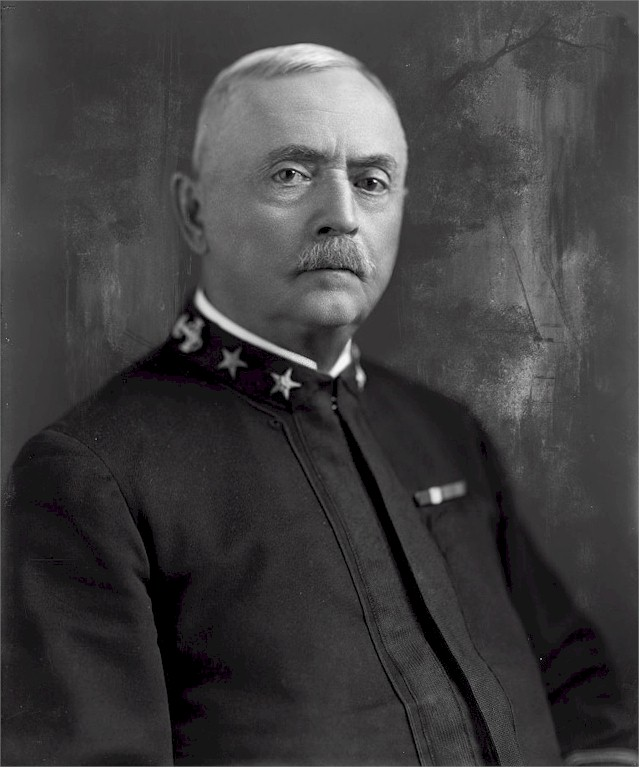
- Born: December 4, 1847; Niles, Michigan
- Died: April 21, 1931 (aged 83)
- Military career
- Allegiance: United States of America
- Branch: United States Navy
- Service years: 1868–1909, 1915-1919
- Rank: Rear Admiral
- Conflicts: World War I

Rear Admiral Royal Rodney Ingersoll (4 December 1847 – 21 April 1931) was a United States Navy officer whose career extended from the late 1860s through World War I.

== Biography ==
Ingersoll was born in Niles, Michigan on 4 December 1847 and graduated from the United States Naval Academy in 1868. He served in various ships of the fleet on the European and Asiatic Squadrons until 1876 when he was assigned to the Naval Academy.

He taught and wrote about ordnance subjects during several tours at the Academy, and in the early years of the 20th century commanded such ships as Bennington (PG-4), New Orleans (CL-22), and Maryland (ACR-8). He graduated from the Naval War College as a captain in 1903 and as a rear admiral in 1908.

Ingersoll was Chief of Staff of the Atlantic Fleet during the first part of the Great White Fleet's famous cruise around the world, and served in 1908 as a member of the General Board.

Rear Admiral Ingersoll retired in 1909, but was recalled up to duty during World War I as President of the Naval Ordnance Board. In 1919 he returned to his home in La Porte, Indiana, where he was active in public affairs until his death on 21 April 1931 at age 83.

He was a Companion of the District of Columbia Commandery of the Military Order of the Loyal Legion of the United States.

His son, Admiral Royal Eason Ingersoll (1883–1976), was a Navy Cross recipient and commanded the US Atlantic Fleet during World War II.

== Namesake ==
In 1943, the destroyer USS Ingersoll (DD-652) was named in honor of R. Adm. Ingersoll and his grandson, Lieutenant Royal R. Ingersoll II (1913–1942), who had died in the Battle of Midway.
