= Rykert =

Rykert is a surname. Notable people with the surname include:

- Arthur Frederick Rykert (1870–1933), Canadian politician in Ontario
- George Rykert (1797–1857), Upper Canadian politician and surveyor
- John Charles Rykert (1832–1913), Canadian lawyer and politician
