= 29th Canadian Parliament =

1973-74 seating of the national legislature of the North American country

- Minority parliament
- Jan. 4, 1973 – May. 9, 1974

Parliament leaders
- Prime minister: Pierre Trudeau; Apr. 20, 1968 – Jun. 4, 1979
- Cabinet: 20th Canadian Ministry
- Leader of the Opposition: Robert Stanfield; November 6, 1967 – November 21, 1976

Party caucuses
- Government: Liberal Party
- Opposition: Progressive Conservative Party
- Recognized: New Democratic Party
- Social Credit Party

House of Commons
- Seating arrangements of the House of Commons
- Speaker of the Commons: Lucien Lamoureux; January 18, 1966 – September 29, 1974
- Government House leader: Allan MacEachen; September 24, 1970 – May 9, 1974
- Opposition House leader: Ged Baldwin; July 27, 1968 – September 20, 1973
- Thomas Bell; September 21, 1973 – May 9, 1974
- Members: 264 MP seats List of members

Senate
- Speaker of the Senate: Muriel Fergusson; December 14, 1972 – September 11, 1974
- Government Senate leader: Paul Martin Sr. April 1, 1969 – August 7, 1974
- Opposition Senate leader: Jacques Flynn; October 31, 1967 – May 22, 1979
- Senators: 102 senator seats List of senators

Sovereign
- Monarch: Elizabeth II; 6 February 1952 – 8 September 2022
- Governor general: Roland Michener; 17 April 1967 – 14 January 1974
- Jules Léger; 14 January 1974 – 22 January 1979

Sessions
- 1st session January 4, 1973 – February 26, 1974
- 2nd session February 27, 1974 – May 9, 1974
| ← 28th | → 30th |

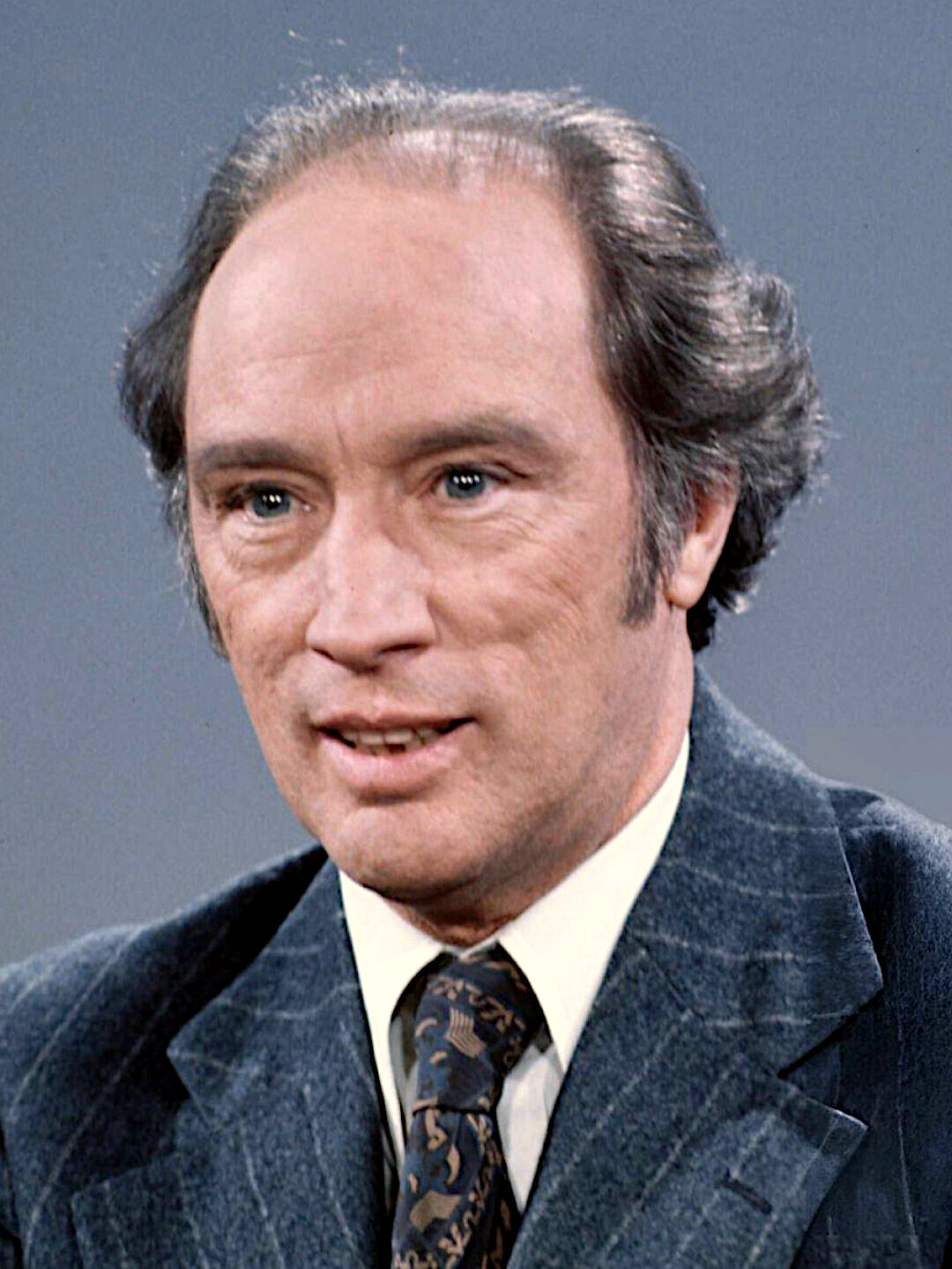
Pierre Trudeau was Prime Minister during the 29th Canadian Parliament.

The 29th Canadian Parliament was in session from January 4, 1973, until May 9, 1974. The membership was set by the 1972 federal election on October 30, 1972, and it was dissolved prior to the 1974 election.

There were two sessions of the 29th Parliament:

| Session | Start | End |
|---|---|---|
| 1st | January 4, 1973 | February 26, 1974 |
| 2nd | February 27, 1974 | May 9, 1974 |

== Overview ==
The 29th Canadian Parliament was controlled by a Liberal Party minority led by Prime Minister Pierre Trudeau and the 20th Canadian Ministry, with the support of David Lewis's New Democratic Party. The Official Opposition was the Progressive Conservative Party, led by Robert Stanfield. The Speaker was Lucien Lamoureux.

The government lost the confidence of the house in 1974 when finance minister John Turner's budget was defeated by a vote of 137 to 123, prompting the prime minister to seek dissolution of parliament for the next election.

== Party standings ==
| Number of members per party | Party leader | General Election |
| Number of members per party | Party leader | Oct 30, 1972 |
|---|---|---|
| Liberal | Pierre Trudeau | 109 |
| Progressive Conservative | Robert Stanfield | 107 |
| New Democratic Party | David Lewis | 31 |
| Social Credit | Réal Caouette | 15 |
| No affiliation | | 1 |
| Independent | | 1 |
| Total Seats | 264 | |

== Major events ==
=== Criminal law reform ===
==== Vagrancy ====
The Criminal Law Amendment Act, 1972 removed three offences from the criminal code related to vagrancy: wandering in public without apparent means of support, begging, and being a common prostitute or night walker.

=== Housing programs ===
The government introduced changed to the National Housing Act resulting in three distinct programs. Providing assistance in purchasing housing to new home buyers, providing loans to create co-operative housing, and providing loans for municipal and non-profit housing development.

=== Expansion of RRSP ===
Changes to the Income Tax Act during the 29th Parliament resulted in population wide access to Registered Retirement Savings Plans. The program had previously been available only to self-employed Canadians.

=== Harbourgate ===
On May 29, 1974, five men including the Hamilton Harbour commissioner were charged with fraud, conspiracy and uttering forged documents (in relation to unnecessary dredging work that had been undertaken on the Hamilton Harbour) and bid rigging. This resulted in a national scandal with a year-long trial of officials from dredging companies who were implicated in bid rigging for work done at other ports. Labour minister John Munro offered to resign from cabinet over unfounded allegations that surfaced during the trial, but Trudeau refused his resignation.

=== Trudeau, Calder, and the modern treaty era ===
Following the result of Calder v British Columbia, Prime Minister Trudeau and Indian Affairs Minister Jean Chretien met with Frank Calder of the Nisga'a First Nation. These talks resulted in the introduction of a new land claim policy.

== Ministry ==
The 20th Canadian Ministry began near the end of the 27th Canadian Parliament and governed throughout the 28th Canadian Parliament, 29th Canadian Parliament, and 30th Canadian Parliament.

== Officeholders ==
=== Head of State ===
| Office | Photo | Name | Assumed office | Left office |
|---|---|---|---|---|
| Sovereign | | Elizabeth II | February 6, 1952 | September 8, 2022 |
| Governor General | | Roland Michener | April 17, 1967 | January 14, 1974 |
| Governor General | | Jules Léger | January 14, 1974 | January 22, 1979 |

=== Party leadership ===
| Party | Photo | Name | Assumed office | Left office |
|---|---|---|---|---|
| Liberal | | Pierre Trudeau | April 6, 1968 | June 16, 1984 |
| Progressive Conservative | | Robert Stanfield | November 6, 1967 | February 21, 1976 |
| New Democratic | | David Lewis | April 24, 1971 | July 6, 1975 |
| Social Credit | | Réal Caouette | 1971 | 1976 |

=== House of Commons ===
==== Presiding officer ====
| Office | Photo | Officer | Riding | Assumed office | Left office | Party |
|---|---|---|---|---|---|---|
| Speaker of the House of Commons | | Lucien Lamoureux | Stormont—Dundas | January 18, 1966 | September 29, 1974 | Liberal |

==== Government leadership (Liberal) ====
| Office | Photo | Officer | Riding | Assumed office | Left office |
|---|---|---|---|---|---|
| Prime Minister | | Pierre Trudeau | Mount Royal | April 20, 1968 | June 4, 1979 |
| Prime Minister | | Pierre Trudeau | Mount Royal | March 3, 1980 | June 30, 1984 |
| House Leader | | Allan MacEachen | Cape Breton Highlands—Canso | May 4, 1967 | April 23, 1968 |
| House Leader | | Allan MacEachen | Cape Breton Highlands—Canso | September 24, 1970 | May 9, 1974 |
| House Leader | | Allan MacEachen | Cape Breton Highlands—Canso | September 14, 1976 | March 26, 1979 |
| Whip | | Thomas Lefebvre | Pontiac | December 1972 | October 1975 |

== Changes to party standings ==
=== By-elections ===
No by-elections were called during the 29th Parliament. Two seats remained vacant when the 1974 federal election was called.

== Parliamentarians ==
=== House of Commons ===
Members of the House of Commons in the 29th parliament arranged by province.

Key:

- Party leaders are italicized.
- Parliamentary secretaries is indicated by "‡".
- Cabinet ministers are in **boldface**.
- The Prime Minister is **both**.
- The Speaker is indicated by "(†)".

==== Alberta ====
| Riding | Member | Political party | First elected / previously elected | No. of terms |
|---|---|---|---|---|
| Athabasca | Paul Yewchuk | Progressive Conservative | 1968 | 2nd term |
| Battle River | Harry Kuntz* | Progressive Conservative | 1972 | 1st term |
| Calgary Centre | Harvie Andre | Progressive Conservative | 1972 | 1st term |
| Calgary North | Eldon Woolliams | Progressive Conservative | 1958 | 6th term |
| Calgary South | Peter Bawden | Progressive Conservative | 1972 | 1st term |
| Crowfoot | Jack Horner | Progressive Conservative | 1958 | 6th term |
| Edmonton Centre | Steve Paproski | Progressive Conservative | 1968 | 2nd term |
| Edmonton East | William Skoreyko | Progressive Conservative | 1958 | 6th term |
| Edmonton West | Marcel Lambert | Progressive Conservative | 1957 | 7th term |
| Edmonton—Strathcona | Douglas Roche | Progressive Conservative | 1972 | 1st term |
| Lethbridge | Kenneth Earl Hurlburt | Progressive Conservative | 1972 | 1st term |
| Medicine Hat | Bert Hargrave | Progressive Conservative | 1972 | 1st term |
| Palliser | Stanley Schumacher | Progressive Conservative | 1968 | 2nd term |
| Peace River | Ged Baldwin | Progressive Conservative | 1958 | 6th term |
| Pembina | Daniel Hollands | Progressive Conservative | 1972 | 1st term |
| Red Deer | Gordon Towers | Progressive Conservative | 1972 | 1st term |
| Rocky Mountain | Joe Clark | Progressive Conservative | 1972 | 1st term |
| Vegreville | Don Mazankowski | Progressive Conservative | 1968 | 2nd term |
| Wetaskiwin | Kenneth Schellenberger | Progressive Conservative | 1972 | 1st term |

* Harry Kuntz died in office on November 16, 1973 and the seat remains vacant

==== British Columbia ====
| Riding | Member | Political party | First elected / previously elected | No. of terms |
|---|---|---|---|---|
| Burnaby—Richmond | John Reynolds | Progressive Conservative | 1972 | 1st term |
| Burnaby—Seymour | Nels Nelson | New Democrat | 1972 | 1st term |
| Capilano | **Jack Davis** | Liberal | 1962 | 5th term |
| Coast Chilcotin | Harry Olaussen | New Democrat | 1972 | 1st term |
| Comox—Alberni | Tom Barnett | New Democrat | 1953, 1962, 1969 | 7th term* |
| Esquimalt—Saanich | Donald Munro | Progressive Conservative | 1972 | 1st term |
| Fraser Valley East | Alexander Patterson | Progressive Conservative | 1953, (Note: First elected as a Social Credit) 1962, (Note: Re-elected as a Social Credit) 1972 | 6th term* |
| Fraser Valley West | Mark Rose | New Democrat | 1968 | 2nd term |
| Kamloops—Cariboo | Leonard Marchand ‡ | Liberal | 1968 | 2nd term |
| Kootenay West | Randolph Harding | New Democrat | 1968 | 2nd term |
| Nanaimo—Cowichan—The Islands | Tommy Douglas | New Democrat | 1935, (Note: Weyburn (Saskatchewan)) 1962, (Note: Burnaby—Coquitlam) 1969 | 7th term* |
| New Westminster | Stuart Leggatt | New Democrat | 1972 | 1st term |
| Okanagan Boundary | George Whittaker | Progressive Conservative | 1972 | 1st term |
| Okanagan—Kootenay | William Douglas Stewart | Liberal | 1968 | 2nd term |
| Prince George—Peace River | Frank Oberle Sr. | Progressive Conservative | 1972 | 1st term |
| Skeena | Frank Howard | New Democrat | 1957 | 7th term |
| Surrey—White Rock | Barry Mather | New Democrat | 1962 | 5th term |
| Vancouver Centre | **Ron Basford** | Liberal | 1963 | 4th term |
| Vancouver East | Paddy Neale | New Democrat | 1972 | 1st term |
| Vancouver Kingsway | Grace MacInnis | New Democrat | 1965 | 3rd term |
| Vancouver Quadra | Bill Clarke | Progressive Conservative | 1972 | 1st term |
| Vancouver South | John Allen Fraser | Progressive Conservative | 1972 | 1st term |
| Victoria | Allan McKinnon | Progressive Conservative | 1972 | 1st term |

==== Manitoba ====
| Riding | Member | Political party | First elected / previously elected | No. of terms |
|---|---|---|---|---|
| Brandon—Souris | Walter Dinsdale | Progressive Conservative | 1951 | 9th term |
| Churchill | Charles Taylor | Progressive Conservative | 1972 | 1st term |
| Dauphin | Gordon Ritchie | Progressive Conservative | 1968 | 2nd term |
| Lisgar | Jack Murta | Progressive Conservative | 1970 | 2nd term |
| Marquette | Craig Stewart | Progressive Conservative | 1968 | 2nd term |
| Portage | Peter Masniuk | Progressive Conservative | 1972 | 1st term |
| Provencher | Jake Epp | Progressive Conservative | 1972 | 1st term |
| Selkirk | Doug Rowland | New Democrat | 1970 | 2nd term |
| St. Boniface | Joseph-Philippe Guay ‡ | Liberal | 1968 | 2nd term |
| Winnipeg North | David Orlikow | New Democrat | 1962 | 5th term |
| Winnipeg North Centre | Stanley Knowles | New Democrat | 1942, 1962 | 10th term* |
| Winnipeg South | **James Richardson** | Liberal | 1968 | 2nd term |
| Winnipeg South Centre | Dan McKenzie | Progressive Conservative | 1972 | 1st term |

==== New Brunswick ====
| Riding | Member | Political party | First elected / previously elected | No. of terms |
|---|---|---|---|---|
| Carleton—Charlotte | Fred McCain | Progressive Conservative | 1972 | 1st term |
| Fundy—Royal | Robert Fairweather | Progressive Conservative | 1962 | 5th term |
| Gloucester | Herb Breau ‡ | Liberal | 1968 | 2nd term |
| Madawaska—Victoria | Eymard Corbin | Liberal | 1968 | 2nd term |
| Moncton | Charlie Thomas | Progressive Conservative | 1968 | 2nd term |
| Northumberland—Miramichi | Percy Smith | Liberal | 1968 | 2nd term |
| Restigouche | **Jean-Eudes Dubé** | Liberal | 1962 | 5th term |
| Saint John—Lancaster | Thomas Bell | Progressive Conservative | 1953 | 8th term |
| Westmorland—Kent | Roméo LeBlanc | Liberal | 1972 | 1st term |
| York—Sunbury | J. Robert Howie | Progressive Conservative | 1972 | 1st term |

==== Newfoundland ====
| Riding | Member | Political party | First elected / previously elected | No. of terms |
|---|---|---|---|---|
| Bonavista—Trinity—Conception | Dave Rooney | Liberal | 1972 | 1st term |
| Burin—Burgeo | **Donald Jamieson** | Liberal | 1966 | 3rd term |
| Gander—Twillingate | John Lundrigan | Progressive Conservative | 1968 | 2nd term |
| Grand Falls—White Bay—Labrador | Bill Rompkey ‡ | Liberal | 1972 | 1st term |
| Humber—St. George's—St. Barbe | Jack Marshall | Progressive Conservative | 1968 | 2nd term |
| St. John's East | James McGrath | Progressive Conservative | 1957, 1968 | 5th term* |
| St. John's West | Walter Carter | Progressive Conservative | 1968 | 2nd term |

==== Nova Scotia ====
| Riding | Member | Political party | First elected / previously elected | No. of terms |
|---|---|---|---|---|
| Annapolis Valley | Pat Nowlan | Progressive Conservative | 1965 | 3rd term |
| Cape Breton Highlands—Canso | **Allan MacEachen** | Liberal | 1953, 1962 | 7th term* |
| Cape Breton—East Richmond | Donald MacInnis | Progressive Conservative | 1957, 1963 | 6th term* |
| Cape Breton—The Sydneys | Robert Muir | Progressive Conservative | 1957 | 7th term |
| Central Nova | Elmer MacKay | Progressive Conservative | 1971 | 2nd term |
| Cumberland—Colchester North | Robert Coates | Progressive Conservative | 1957 | 7th term |
| Dartmouth—Halifax East | Michael Forrestall | Progressive Conservative | 1965 | 3rd term |
| Halifax | Robert Stanfield | Progressive Conservative | 1967 | 3rd term |
| Halifax—East Hants | Robert McCleave | Progressive Conservative | 1957, 1965 | 6th term* |
| South Shore | Lloyd Crouse | Progressive Conservative | 1957 | 7th term |
| South Western Nova | Charles Haliburton | Progressive Conservative | 1972 | 1st term |

==== Ontario ====
| Riding | Member | Political party | First elected / previously elected | No. of terms |
|---|---|---|---|---|
| Algoma | Maurice Foster ‡ | Liberal | 1968 | 2nd term |
| Brant | Derek Blackburn | New Democrat | 1971 | 2nd term |
| Broadview | John Gilbert | New Democrat | 1965 | 3rd term |
| Bruce | Ross Whicher | Liberal | 1968 | 2nd term |
| Cochrane | Ralph Stewart | Liberal | 1968 | 2nd term |
| Davenport | Charles Caccia | Liberal | 1968 | 2nd term |
| Don Valley | James Gillies | Progressive Conservative | 1972 | 1st term |
| Eglinton | **Mitchell Sharp** | Liberal | 1963 | 4th term |
| Elgin | John Wise | Progressive Conservative | 1972 | 1st term |
| Essex—Windsor | **Eugene Whelan** | Liberal | 1962 | 5th term |
| Etobicoke | **Alastair Gillespie** | Liberal | 1968 | 2nd term |
| Fort William | Paul McRae | Liberal | 1972 | 1st term |
| Frontenac—Lennox and Addington | Douglas Alkenbrack | Progressive Conservative | 1962 | 5th term |
| Glengarry—Prescott—Russell | Denis Éthier | Liberal | 1972 | 1st term |
| Greenwood | Andrew Brewin | New Democrat | 1962 | 5th term |
| Grenville—Carleton | Walter Baker | Progressive Conservative | 1972 | 1st term |
| Grey—Simcoe | Gus Mitges | Progressive Conservative | 1972 | 1st term |
| Halton | Terry O'Connor | Progressive Conservative | 1972 | 1st term |
| Halton—Wentworth | Bill Kempling | Progressive Conservative | 1972 | 1st term |
| Hamilton East | **John Munro** | Liberal | 1962 | 5th term |
| Hamilton Mountain | Duncan M. Beattie | Progressive Conservative | 1972 | 1st term |
| Hamilton—Wentworth | Sean O'Sullivan | Progressive Conservative | 1972 | 1st term |
| Hamilton West | Lincoln Alexander | Progressive Conservative | 1968 | 2nd term |
| Hastings | Jack Ellis | Progressive Conservative | 1972 | 1st term |
| High Park—Humber Valley | Otto Jelinek | Progressive Conservative | 1972 | 1st term |
| Huron | Robert McKinley | Progressive Conservative | 1965 | 3rd term |
| Kenora—Rainy River | John Mercer Reid ‡ | Liberal | 1965 | 3rd term |
| Kent—Essex | Harold Danforth | Progressive Conservative | 1958, 1963 | 5th term* |
| Kingston and the Islands | Flora MacDonald | Progressive Conservative | 1972 | 1st term |
| Kitchener | Kieth Hymmen | Liberal | 1965 | 3rd term |
| Lakeshore | Terry Grier | New Democrat | 1972 | 1st term |
| Lambton—Kent | John Holmes | Progressive Conservative | 1972 | 1st term |
| Lanark—Renfrew—Carleton | Paul Dick | Progressive Conservative | 1972 | 1st term |
| Leeds | Thomas Cossitt | Progressive Conservative | 1972 | 1st term |
| Lincoln | Ken Higson | Progressive Conservative | 1972 | 1st term |
| London East | Charles Turner ‡ | Liberal | 1968 | 2nd term |
| London West | Judd Buchanan | Liberal | 1968 | 2nd term |
| Middlesex | William Frank | Progressive Conservative | 1972 | 1st term |
| Niagara Falls | Joe Hueglin | Progressive Conservative | 1972 | 1st term |
| Nickel Belt | John Rodriguez | New Democrat | 1972 | 1st term |
| Nipissing | Jean-Jacques Blais | Liberal | 1972 | 1st term |
| Norfolk—Haldimand | William David Knowles | Progressive Conservative | 1968 | 2nd term |
| Northumberland—Durham | Allan Lawrence | Progressive Conservative | 1972 | 1st term |
| Ontario | Norman Cafik ‡ | Liberal | 1968 | 2nd term |
| Oshawa—Whitby | Ed Broadbent | New Democrat | 1968 | 2nd term |
| Ottawa—Carleton | **John Turner** | Liberal | 1962 | 5th term |
| Ottawa Centre | Hugh Poulin | Liberal | 1972 | 1st term |
| Ottawa East | Jean-Robert Gauthier | Liberal | 1972 | 1st term |
| Ottawa West | Peter Reilly | Progressive Conservative | 1972 | 1st term |
| Oxford | Wally Nesbitt* | Progressive Conservative | 1953 | 8th term |
| Parkdale | **Stanley Haidasz** | Liberal | 1957, (Note: Trinity) 1962 | 6th term* |
| Parry Sound-Muskoka | Stan Darling | Progressive Conservative | 1972 | 1st term |
| Peel—Dufferin—Simcoe | Ellwood Madill | Progressive Conservative | 1963, 1972 | 3rd term* |
| Peel South | Don Blenkarn | Progressive Conservative | 1972 | 1st term |
| Perth—Wilmot | William Jarvis | Progressive Conservative | 1972 | 1st term |
| Peterborough | **Hugh Faulkner** | Liberal | 1965 | 3rd term |
| Port Arthur | **Bob Andras** | Liberal | 1965 | 3rd term |
| Prince Edward—Hastings | George Hees | Progressive Conservative | 1950, (Note: Broadview) 1965 | 8th term* |
| Renfrew North—Nipissing East | Len Hopkins ‡ | Liberal | 1965 | 3rd term |
| Rosedale | **Donald Stovel Macdonald** | Liberal | 1962 | 5th term |
| Sarnia—Lambton | Bud Cullen | Liberal | 1968 | 2nd term |
| Sault Ste. Marie | Cyril Symes | New Democrat | 1972 | 1st term |
| Scarborough East | Reginald Stackhouse | Progressive Conservative | 1972 | 1st term |
| Scarborough West | John Paul Harney | New Democrat | 1972 | 1st term |
| Simcoe North | Philip Rynard | Progressive Conservative | 1957 | 7th term |
| Spadina | Peter Stollery | Liberal | 1972 | 1st term |
| St. Catharines | J. Trevor Morgan | Progressive Conservative | 1972 | 1st term |
| St. Paul's | Ron Atkey | Progressive Conservative | 1972 | 1st term |
| Stormont—Dundas | Lucien Lamoureux (†) | Independent | 1962 (Note: First elected as a Liberal) | 5th term |
| Sudbury | James Jerome | Liberal | 1968 | 2nd term |
| Thunder Bay | Keith Penner | Liberal | 1968 | 2nd term |
| Timiskaming | Arnold Peters | New Democrat | 1957 | 7th term |
| Timmins | Jean Roy | Liberal | 1968 | 2nd term |
| Trinity | Paul Hellyer | Progressive Conservative | 1949, (Note: Davenport (First elected as a Liberal)) 1958 (Note: Re-elected as a Liberal) | 8th term* |
| Victoria—Haliburton | William C. Scott | Progressive Conservative | 1965 | 3rd term |
| Waterloo | Max Saltsman | New Democrat | 1964 | 4th term |
| Welland | Victor Railton | Liberal | 1972 | 1st term |
| Wellington | Alfred Hales | Progressive Conservative | 1957 | 7th term |
| Wellington—Grey—Dufferin—Waterloo | Perrin Beatty | Progressive Conservative | 1972 | 1st term |
| Windsor West | **Herb Gray** | Liberal | 1962 | 5th term |
| Windsor—Walkerville | Mark MacGuigan ‡ | Liberal | 1968 | 2nd term |
| York Centre | James E. Walker | Liberal | 1962 | 5th term |
| York East | Ian Arrol | Progressive Conservative | 1972 | 1st term |
| York North | Barney Danson | Liberal | 1968 | 2nd term |
| York—Scarborough | **Robert Stanbury** | Liberal | 1965 | 3rd term |
| York—Simcoe | Sinclair Stevens | Progressive Conservative | 1972 | 1st term |
| York South | David Lewis | New Democrat | 1962, 1965 | 4th term* |
| York West | James Fleming | Liberal | 1972 | 1st term |

* Wally Nesbitt died in office on December 21, 1973 and the seat remains vacant

==== Prince Edward Island ====
| Riding | Member | Political party | First elected / previously elected | No. of terms |
|---|---|---|---|---|
| Cardigan | **Daniel J. MacDonald** | Liberal | 1972 | 1st term |
| Egmont | David MacDonald | Progressive Conservative | 1965 | 3rd term |
| Hillsborough | Heath MacQuarrie | Progressive Conservative | 1957 | 7th term |
| Malpeque | Angus MacLean | Progressive Conservative | 1951 | 9th term |

==== Quebec ====
| Riding | Member | Political party | First elected / previously elected | No. of terms |
|---|---|---|---|---|
| Abitibi | Gérard Laprise | Social Credit | 1962 | 5th term |
| Ahuntsic | **Jeanne Sauvé** | Liberal | 1972 | 1st term |
| Argenteuil | Francis Fox | Liberal | 1972 | 1st term |
| Beauce | Yves Caron | Liberal | 1972 | 1st term |
| Beauharnois—Salaberry | Gérald Laniel | Liberal | 1962 | 5th term |
| Bellechasse | Joseph Lambert | Social Credit | 1968 | 2nd term |
| Berthier | Antonio Yanakis | Liberal | 1965 | 3rd term |
| Brome—Missisquoi | Heward Grafftey | Progressive Conservative | 1958, 1972 | 5th term* |
| Bonaventure—Îles-de-la-Madeleine | Albert Béchard | Liberal | 1962 | 5th term |
| Montreal—Bourassa | Jacques Trudel | Liberal | 1968 | 2nd term |
| Chambly | Yvon L'Heureux | Liberal | 1957, 1971 | 3rd term* |
| Champlain | René Matte | Social Credit | 1968 | 2nd term |
| Charlevoix | Gilles Caouette | Social Credit | 1972 | 1st term |
| Chicoutimi | Paul Langlois | Liberal | 1965 | 3rd term |
| Compton | Henry Latulippe | Social Credit | 1962 | 5th term |
| Dollard | **Jean-Pierre Goyer** | Liberal | 1965 | 3rd term |
| Drummond | Jean-Marie Boisvert | Social Credit | 1972 | 1st term |
| Duvernay | Yves Demers | Liberal | 1972 | 1st term |
| Frontenac | Léopold Corriveau ‡ | Liberal | 1970 | 2nd term |
| Gamelin | Arthur Portelance | Liberal | 1968 | 2nd term |
| Gaspé | Alexandre Cyr | Liberal | 1963, 1968 | 3rd term* |
| Gatineau | Gaston Clermont | Liberal | 1960, (Note: Labelle) 1965 | 5th term* |
| Hochelaga | **Gérard Pelletier** | Liberal | 1965 | 3rd term |
| Hull | Gaston Isabelle | Liberal | 1965 | 3rd term |
| Joliette | Roch La Salle* | Independent | 1968 (Note: First elected as a Progressive Conservative) | 2nd term |
| Joliette | Roch La Salle* | Progressive Conservative | 1968 | 2nd term |
| Kamouraska | Charles-Eugène Dionne | Social Credit | 1962 | 5th term |
| Labelle | Maurice Dupras | Liberal | 1970 | 2nd term |
| Lac-Saint-Jean | Marcel Lessard | Liberal | 1962, 1968 | 4th term* |
| Lachine | Roderick Blaker | Liberal | 1972 | 1st term |
| Lafontaine | Georges-C. Lachance | Liberal | 1962 | 5th term |
| Langelier | **Jean Marchand** | Liberal | 1965 | 3rd term |
| Lapointe | Gilles Marceau ‡ | Liberal | 1968 | 2nd term |
| La Prairie | Ian Watson | Liberal | 1963 | 4th term |
| Lasalle | John Campbell | Liberal | 1972 | 1st term |
| Laurier | Fernand Leblanc | Liberal | 1964 | 4th term |
| Laval | Marcel-Claude Roy | Liberal | 1968 | 2nd term |
| Lévis | Raynald Guay ‡ | Liberal | 1963 | 4th term |
| Longueuil | Jacques Olivier | Liberal | 1972 | 1st term |
| Lotbiniere | André-Gilles Fortin | Social Credit | 1968 | 2nd term |
| Louis-Hébert | Albanie Morin | Liberal | 1972 | 1st term |
| Maissonneuve—Rosemont | J. Antonio Thomas | Liberal | 1965 | 3rd term |
| Manicouagan | Gustave Blouin | Liberal | 1963 | 4th term |
| Matane | Pierre de Bané ‡ | Liberal | 1968 | 2nd term |
| Mercier | Prosper Boulanger | Liberal | 1962 | 5th term |
| Montmorency | Ovide Laflamme | Liberal | 1955, (Note: Bellechasse) 1965 | 5th term* |
| Mount Royal | **Pierre Trudeau** | Liberal | 1965 | 3rd term |
| Notre-Dame-de-Grâce | **Warren Allmand** | Liberal | 1965 | 3rd term |
| Outremont | **Marc Lalonde** | Liberal | 1972 | 1st term |
| Papineau | **André Ouellet** | Liberal | 1967 | 3rd term |
| Pontiac | Thomas Lefebvre | Liberal | 1965 | 3rd term |
| Portneuf | Roland Godin | Social Credit | 1965 | 3rd term |
| Quebec East | Gérard Duquet | Liberal | 1965 | 3rd term |
| Richelieu | Florian Côté | Liberal | 1966 | 3rd term |
| Richmond | Léonel Beaudoin | Social Credit | 1968 | 2nd term |
| Rimouski | Eudore Allard | Social Credit | 1972 | 1st term |
| Roberval | Charles-Arthur Gauthier | Social Credit | 1962 | 5th term |
| Saint-Denis | Marcel Prud'homme ‡ | Liberal | 1964 | 4th term |
| Saint-Henri | Gérard Loiselle | Liberal | 1957 | 7th term |
| Saint-Hyacinthe | Claude Wagner | Progressive Conservative | 1972 | 1st term |
| Saint-Jacques | Jacques Guilbault | Liberal | 1968 | 2nd term |
| Saint-Jean | Walter Smith | Liberal | 1968 | 2nd term |
| Saint-Maurice | **Jean Chrétien** | Liberal | 1963 | 4th term |
| Saint-Michel | Monique Bégin | Liberal | 1972 | 1st term |
| Sainte-Marie | Raymond Dupont | Liberal | 1972 | 1st term |
| Shefford | Gilbert Rondeau | Social Credit | 1962, 1968 | 4th term* |
| Sherbrooke | Irénée Pelletier | Liberal | 1972 | 1st term |
| Témiscamingue | Réal Caouette | Social Credit | 1946, (Note: Pontiac) 1962 | 6th term* |
| Témiscouata | Rosaire Gendron | Liberal | 1963 | 4th term |
| Terrebonne | Joseph-Roland Comtois ‡ | Liberal | 1965 | 3rd term |
| Trois-Rivières | Claude Lajoie | Liberal | 1971 | 2nd term |
| Vaudreuil | Hal Herbert | Liberal | 1972 | 1st term |
| Verdun | **Bryce Mackasey** | Liberal | 1962 | 5th term |
| Villeneuve | Oza Tétrault | Social Credit | 1968 | 2nd term |
| Westmount | **Charles (Bud) Drury** | Liberal | 1962 | 5th term |

* Roch La Salle rejoined the Progressive Conservative on February 26, 1974

==== Saskatchewan ====
| Riding | Member | Political party | First elected / previously elected | No. of terms |
|---|---|---|---|---|
| Assiniboia | Bill Knight | New Democrat | 1971 | 2nd term |
| Battleford—Kindersley | Norval Horner | Progressive Conservative | 1972 | 1st term |
| Mackenzie | Stanley Korchinski | Progressive Conservative | 1958 | 6th term |
| Meadow Lake | Eli Nesdoly | New Democrat | 1972 | 1st term |
| Moose Jaw | Douglas Neil | Progressive Conservative | 1972 | 1st term |
| Prince Albert | John Diefenbaker | Progressive Conservative | 1940 | 11th term |
| Qu'Apelle—Moose Mountain | Alvin Hamilton | Progressive Conservative | 1957, (Note: Qu'Appelle) 1972 | 6th term* |
| Regina East | James Balfour | Progressive Conservative | 1972 | 1st term |
| Regina—Lake Centre | Les Benjamin | New Democrat | 1968 | 2nd term |
| Saskatoon—Biggar | Alfred Gleave | New Democrat | 1968 | 2nd term |
| Saskatoon—Humboldt | **Otto Lang** | Liberal | 1968 | 2nd term |
| Swift Current—Maple Creek | Frank Hamilton | Progressive Conservative | 1972 | 1st term |
| Yorkton—Melville | Lorne Nystrom | New Democrat | 1968 | 2nd term |

==== Territories ====
| Riding | Member | Political party | First elected / previously elected | No. of terms |
|---|---|---|---|---|
| Northwest Territories | Wally Firth | New Democrat | 1972 | 1st term |
| Yukon | Erik Nielsen | Progressive Conservative | 1957 | 7th term |

== Committees ==
=== House ===
==== Standing ====
- Standing Committee on Agriculture
- Standing Committee on Broadcasting, Films and Assistance to the Arts
- Standing Committee on External Affairs and National Defence
- Standing Committee on Finance, Trade and Economic Affairs
- Standing Committee on Fisheries and Forestry
- Standing Committee on Health, Welfare and Social Affair
- Standing Committee on Indian Affairs and Northern Development
- Standing Committee on Justice and Legal Affairs
- Standing Committee on Labour, Manpower and Immigration
- Standing Committee on Miscellaneous Estimates
- Standing Committee on Miscellaneous Private Bills and Standing Orders
- Standing Committee on National Resources and Public Works
- Standing Committee on Privileges and Elections
- Standing Committee on Procedure and Organization
- Standing Committee on Public Accounts
- Standing Committee on Regional Development
- Standing Joint Committee on Regulations and other Statutory Instruments
- Standing Committee on Transport and Communications
- Standing Committee on Veterans Affairs

==== Special ====
- Special Committee on Trends in Food Prices

=== Senate ===
==== Standing ====
- Standing Committee on Agriculture
- Standing Committee on Banking, Trade and Commerce
- Standing Committee on Foreign Affairs
- Standing Committee on Health, Welfare and Science
- Standing Committee on Legal and Constitutional Affairs
- Standing Committee on National Finance
- Standing Committee on Transport and Communications

==== Special ====
- Special Committee on Science Policy

=== Joint ===
- Standing Joint Committee on Regulations and other Statutory Instruments

== Legislation and motions ==
=== Act's which received royal assent under 29th Parliament ===
==== 1st Session ====
===== Public acts =====
| Date of Assent | Index | Title | Bill Number |
|---|---|---|---|
| January 31, 1973 | 1 | Pilotage Act, An Act to amend the | C-127 |
| February 8, 1973 | 2 | Unemployment Insurance Act, 1971 (No. 1), An Act to amend the | C-124 |
| February 23, 1973 | 3 | Appropriation Act No. 1, 1973 | C-141 |
| March 29, 1973 | 4 | Appropriation Act No. 2, 1973 | C-166 |
| March 29, 1973 | 5 | Appropriation Act No. 3, 1973 | C-167 |
| March 29, 1973 | 6 | Electoral Boundaries Readjustment Act, An Act respecting the (Lachine–Lakeshore) | C-31 |
| March 29, 1973 | 7 | Electoral Boundaries Readjustment Act, An Act respecting the (Waterloo–Cambridge) | C-156 |
| April 5, 1973 | 8 | Old Age Security Act, An Act to amend the | C-147 |
| April 5, 1973 | 9 | War Veterans Allowance Act, An Act to amend the | C-148 |
| April 18, 1973 | 10 | Customs Tariff, An Act to amend the | C-172 |
| April 18, 1973 | 11 | Emergency Gold Mining Assistance Act, An Act to amend the | C-130 |
| April 18, 1973 | 12 | Excise Tax Act, An Act to amend the | C-171 |
| April 18, 1973 | 13 | Export Development Act, An Act to amend the | C-3 |
| April 18, 1973 | 14 | Income Tax, An Act to amend the statute law relating to | C-170 |
| April 18, 1973 | 15 | Public Service Staff Relations Act, An Act to amend the | C-178 |
| June 28, 1973 | 16 | Appropriation Act No. 4, 1973 | C-204 |
| June 28, 1973 | 17 | Judges Act, An Act to amend the | C-177 |
| June 28, 1973 | 18 | National Housing Act, An Act to amend the | C-133 |
| June 28, 1973 | 19 | Pension Act, An Act to amend the | C-202 |
| July 27, 1973 | 20 | Aeronautics Act, An Act to amend the | C-128 |
| July 27, 1973 | 21 | Canada Wildlife Act | C-131 |
| July 27, 1973 | 22 | Customs Tariff (No. 2), An Act to amend the | C-195 |
| July 27, 1973 | 23 | Electoral Boundaries Readjustment Suspension Act | C-208 |
| July 27, 1973 | 24 | Excise Tax Act and the Excise Act (No. 2), An Act to amend the | C-194 |
| July 27, 1973 | 25 | Fisheries Development Act, An Act to amend the | C-4 |
| July 27, 1973 | 26 | Harbour Commissions Act (Nanaimo Harbour Commission), An Act to amend the | C-21 |
| July 27, 1973 | 27 | Immigration Appeal Board Act, An Act to amend the | C-197 |
| July 27, 1973 | 28 | Immigration laws and procedures, An Act respecting certain | C-212 |
| July 27, 1973 | 29 | Income Tax Act (No. 2), An Act to amend the | C-192 |
| July 27, 1973 | 30 | Income Tax (No. 3), An Act to amend the statute law relating to | C-193 |
| July 27, 1973 | 31 | Olympic (1976) Act | C-196 |
| September 1, 1973 | 32 | Maintenance of Railway Operations Act, 1973 | C-217 |
| September 14, 1973 | 33 | Crop Insurance Act, An Act to amend the | C-129 |
| September 14, 1973 | 34 | Family Allowances Act and the Youth Allowances Act, An Act to amend the | C-223 |
| September 14, 1973 | 35 | Old Age Security Act, An Act to amend the | C-219 |
| September 14, 1973 | 36 | Statute Law (Supplementary Retirement Benefits) Amendment Act, 1973 | C-220 |
| December 5, 1973 | 37 | Cooperative Credit Associations Act, An Act to amend the | C-183 |
| December 5, 1973 | 38 | Criminal Law Amendment (Capital Punishment) Act | C-2 |
| December 5, 1973 | 39 | Customs Act, An Act to amend the | C-189 |
| December 5, 1973 | 40 | Electoral Boundaries Readjustment Act, An Act respecting the (Mississauga) | C-222 |
| December 12, 1973 | 41 | Canada Pension Plan (No. 2), An Act to amend the | C-224 |
| December 12, 1973 | 42 | Electoral Boundaries Readjustment Act, An Act respecting the (LaSalle–Émard–Côte Saint-Paul) | C-228 |
| December 12, 1973 | 43 | Electoral Boundaries Readjustment Act, An Act respecting the (Ottawa–Vanier) | C-232 |
| December 12, 1973 | 44 | Family Allowances Act, 1973 | C-211 |
| December 12, 1973 | 45 | Federal-Provincial Fiscal Arrangements Act, 1972 et al., An Act to amend the | C-233 |
| December 12, 1973 | 46 | Foreign Investment Review Act | C-132 |
| December 21, 1973 | 47 | Appropriation Act No. 5, 1973 | C-239 |
| December 21, 1973 | 48 | Parole Act, An Act to amend the | C-191 |
| December 21, 1973 | 49 | Residential Mortgage Financing Act | C-135 |
| January 14, 1974 | 50 | Protection of Privacy Act | C-176 |
| January 14, 1974 | 51 | Election Expenses Act | C-203 |
| January 14, 1974 | 52 | Energy Supplies Emergency Act | C-236 |
| January 14, 1974 | 53 | Oil Export Tax Act | C-245 |

===== Local and private acts =====
| Date of Assent | Index | Title | Bill Number |
|---|---|---|---|
| July 27, 1973 | 54 | Centre Amusement Co. Limited, An Act respecting | S-6 |
| December 21, 1973 | 55 | National Dental Examining Board of Canada, An Act respecting The | S-7 |

==== 2nd Session ====
===== Public acts =====
| Date of Assent | Index | Title | Bill Number |
|---|---|---|---|
| March 28, 1974 | 1 | Appropriation Act No. 1, 19 | C-15 |
| March 28, 1974 | 2 | Appropriation Act No. 2, 19 | C-16 |
| April 3, 1974 | 3 | Veterans' Land Act, An Act to amend th | C-17 |
| April 10, 1974 | 4 | Fisheries Development Act, An Act to amend the | C-2 |
| April 10, 1974 | 5 | Yukon Act, the Northwest Territories Act and the Canada Elections Act, An Act to amend the | C-9 |
| April 25, 1974 | 6 | Canadian National Railways Financing and Guarantee Act, 1973 | C-5 |
| May 7, 1974 | 7 | Electoral Boundaries Readjustment Act, An Act respecting the (Huron-Middlesex) | C-277 |
| May 7, 1974 | 8 | Electoral Boundaries Readjustment Act, An Act respecting the (Middlesex-London-Lambton) | C-281 |
| May 7, 1974 | 9 | Export and Import Permits Act, An Act to amend the | C-4 |
| May 7, 1974 | 10 | Farm Improvement Loans Act, the Small Businesses Loans Act and the Fisheries Improvement Loans Act, An Act to amend the | C-14 |
| May 7, 1974 | 11 | National Parks Act, An Act to amend the | C-6 |
| May 7, 1974 | 12 | Railway Relocation and Crossing Act | C-27 |

===== Local and private acts =====
| Date of Assent | Index | Title | Bill Number |
|---|---|---|---|
| April 3, 1974 | 13 | Eastern Canada Synod of the Lutheran Church in America, An Act respecting the | C-264 |

== See also ==
- List of Canadian electoral districts (1966–1976)
