= H. Gordon Barrett =

Canadian politician (1915–1993)

Member of the Canadian Parliament for Lincoln
- In office 1968–1972
- Preceded by: James McNulty
- Succeeded by: Ken Higson

Personal details
- Born: August 20, 1915 Thorold, Ontario, Canada
- Died: May 30, 1993 (aged 77)
- Party: Liberal
- Occupation: safety director

H. Gordon Barrett (August 20, 1915 – May 30, 1993) was a Canadian politician and safety director. He was elected to the House of Commons of Canada as a Member of the Liberal Party to represent the riding of Lincoln. During the 28th Parliament, he was a member of the Standing Committee on Agriculture. He was defeated in 1972. Prior to his federal political experience, he was a lieutenant in the Canadian Infantry in World War II between 1942 and 1945 and returned to Canada to become a councillor for Thorold, Ontario between 1946 and 1959.

1968 Canadian federal election: Lincoln
Party	Candidate	Votes
Liberal	H. Gordon Barrett	13,328
Progressive Conservative	Kenneth Higson	12,692
New Democratic	John Martin	6,763

1972 Canadian federal election: Lincoln
Party	Candidate	Votes
Progressive Conservative	Kenneth Higson	16,840
Liberal	H. Gordon Barrett	13,562
New Democratic	Ron Leavens	6,714
Social Credit	Jim Walters	612
