= Frederick Benson =

Canadian-born British Army officer

Major-General Sir Frederick Benson KCB
- Born: 2 August 1849; St. Catharines, Canada West
- Died: 20 August 1916 (aged 67); Montreal, Canada
- Relatives: James Rea Benson (father); Charles Fortescue Ingersoll (grandfather)
- Military career
- Allegiance: United Kingdom
- Branch: Canadian Militia; British Army
- Service years: 1866–1909
- Rank: Major-General
- Commands: Egyptian Cavalry
- Conflicts: Fenian raids Second Boer War; First World War
- Awards: Knight Commander of the Order of the Bath; Mentioned in Despatches

Major-General Sir Frederick William Benson, KCB (2 August 1849 – 20 August 1916) was a Canadian-born British Army officer. Born into a prominent Canadian family, Benson fought in the Fenian raids as a teen, before proceeding to England to pursue a military career. A cavalry officer, Benson spent much of his early career in India, with the exception of a stint in England to attend the Staff College. He then commanded the Egyptian Cavalry and fought in the Second Boer War as a staff officer with the 6th Division, held a number of senior administrative appointments, before retiring in 1909. On the outbreak of the First World War, Benson went to Canada as the head of the British Remount Commission, tasked with buying horses and mules for the British Army. He died in post in Montreal in 1916.

== Early life in Canada ==
Born at St. Catharines, Canada West, Frederick Benson was the son of Senator James Rea Benson and his wife Marianne, the daughter of Charles Fortescue Ingersoll and a niece of Laura Secord. He was educated at the Grantham Academy, T. B. Phillips' private school at St. Catharines, and Upper Canada College.

In 1866, he enlisted in the 19th Battalion of the Canadian militia and took part in that year's campaign against Fenian raiders on the Niagara frontier as a private. For his service, he received the Canada General Service Medal with clasp. Benson later became honorary colonel of the 19th St. Catharines Regiment. He was also honorary colonel of the 106th Regiment, Winnipeg Light Infantry.

== British Army career ==
=== Early service ===
After the Fenian raids, Benson proceeded to England to attend the Royal Military College, Sandhurst, where he received a sword of honour from the Commander-in-Chief, the Duke of Cambridge, upon his graduation, as well as a second sword from the gentleman cadets of his company as a mark of their esteem.

In 1869, Benson was commissioned as a cornet into the 21st Hussars, then in India, the regiment which (as 21st Lancers) of which he would later become colonel. He became a lieutenant in 1870, before exchanging into the 12th Royal Lancers in 1876. The following year, he became aide-de-camp to the Lieutenant-Governor of the North-Western Provinces, Sir George Couper Bt., whose daughter he married in 1881.

He passed into the Staff College in 1878, heading the list of all cavalry and infantry officers. Upon passing out of the Staff College in 1880, he became a captain in the 5th Dragoon Guards, before exchanging into the 17th Lancers in 1881 in order to serve in India. He was brigade-major at Poona from 1882 to 1884, and garrison instructor at Bengal from 1884 to 1890. He was promoted to major in 1886. In 1890, Benson returned to England with the 17th Lancers.

=== Egyptian Army ===
After two years in England, Benson was given the command of the Egyptian Cavalry in 1892, at the request of General Sir Francis Grenfell and on the recommendation of General Sir George Luck. During his tenure, he expanded and reorganized the force; in 1893, he led the cavalry and camel corps patrol from Suakin to Senkat Wells over unexplored country, returning by a different route in order to offer reassurance to inhabitants who had been recently raided by Osman Digna.

He was promoted to lieutenant-colonel on half-pay in 1893, but was not offered promotion to the rank of miralay in the Egyptian army, even though more junior British officers had been promoted to the rank. He resigned the Egyptian appointment in 1894, being received by the Khedive before his departure. On his last day in Cairo, he passed an examination in Arabic with honours, receiving a prize of 100 guineas.

=== Second Boer War and later career ===
From 1895 to 1898, Benson was Deputy Assistant Adjutant-General for Instruction, Dublin District. Promoted to full colonel in 1898, he was Assistant Adjutant-General, South-Eastern District and Chief Staff Officer to Lieutenant-General Sir William Butler from 1898 to 1900.

During the Second Boer War, Benson was firstly Special Service Officer from 1899 to 1900, then was on staff as Assistant Adjutant-General from 1900 to 1901. As Chief Staff Officer of the 6th Division. Benson was engaged in operations in the Orange Free State from February to May 1900, including actions at Paardeberg, Poplar Grove, and Driefontein. He subsequently saw service in the Orange River Colony from May to November 1900, and in the Cape Colony (south of the Orange River) from January to February 1900. For his services in South Africa, Benson was mentioned in despatches, awarded the Queen's South Africa Medal (with 3 clasps), and was appointed a Companion of the Order of the Bath.

From 1901 to 1903, Benson served at headquarters. From 1903 to 1904, he was Inspector-General of Remounts, with the rank of major-general. From 1904 to 1907 he was appointed Director of Transport and Remounts. From 1907 to 1909, he was Major-General in charge of Administration for the Southern Command. In July 1909, he became colonel of his old regiment, the 21st Lancers.

Benson retired from the army on 4 December 1909 with the rank of major-general, after being passed over for promotion to lieutenant-general despite nearing the list of major-generals. He was created a Knight Commander of the Order of the Bath in 1910. In retirement, he was a ruling councillor of the Primrose League for the Eastbourne habitation.

== First World War and death ==
On the outbreak of the First World War, Benson proceeded to Canada to establish a British Remount Commission, which was tasked with purchasing horses and mules from Canada and the United States. Benson arrived in Canada in August 1914, with eight officers on staff. Benson initially established his headquarters in Toronto, before shifting them to Montreal. Under Benson, stockyards were established a Saint John, Halifax, Montreal, and Toronto and animals were purchased on a very large scale.

Returning to Montreal from a visit to Valcartier with Lady Borden, Benson was taken ill with a heart complain. He recovered for a time, but died on 21 August 1916 at the Ritz-Carlton Hotel. After a service at St. George's Church, Montreal, Benson's remains were taken by train to St. Catharines where, after lying in state at the St George's Church, he was buried with military honours at the Victoria Lawn Cemetery on 23 August, in the presence of the Lieutenant Governor of Ontario, Sir John S. Hendrie. The 162nd (Parry Sound) Battalion, CEF and the 169th Battalion (109th Regiment), CEF marched at his funeral procession. In England, a memorial service was held at St Anne's Church, Eastbourne on 30 August 1916.

== Legacy ==
There is a memorial to Sir Frederick and Lady Benson in St Michael & All Angels Church, Coombe Bissett.

His name is inscribed on the war memorial of Upper Canada College in Toronto.

Frederick Benson Mews, built on the former School of Service Intelligence site in Ashford, Kent, is named after him.

== See also ==
- List of generals of the British Empire who died during the First World War
