= Tony Valeri =

Canadian politician

The Honourable Tony Valeri PC
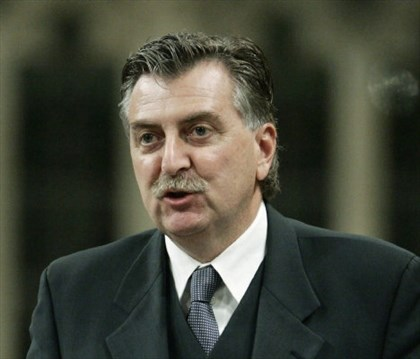
- Valeri in 2004

Leader of the Government in the House of Commons
- In office July 20, 2004 – January 23, 2006
- Prime Minister: Paul Martin
- Preceded by: Jacques Saada
- Succeeded by: Rob Nicholson

Minister of Transport
- In office December 12, 2003 – July 19, 2004
- Prime Minister: Paul Martin
- Preceded by: David Collenette
- Succeeded by: Jean Lapierre

Member of Parliament for Hamilton East—Stoney Creek (Stoney Creek; 1997–2004) (Lincoln; 1993–1997)
- In office October 25, 1993 – January 23, 2006
- Preceded by: Shirley Martin
- Succeeded by: Wayne Marston

Personal details
- Born: August 11, 1957 (age 69) Hamilton, Ontario, Canada
- Party: Liberal
- Education: McMaster University (BA)
- Profession: Politician; businessman

Tony Valeri PC (born August 11, 1957) is a Canadian former politician. He was the Government House Leader in Paul Martin's government from 2004 until 2006. He was narrowly defeated by New Democratic (NDP) candidate Wayne Marston in the 2006 general election held on January 23, 2006.

== Biography ==
Valeri grew up in Hamilton's north-end in the working class Barton and Sherman neighbourhood, the son of Italian immigrants Enzo and Maria Valeri, who arrived in Hamilton in the early 1950s. He graduated from Bishop Ryan Catholic Secondary School and then attended McMaster University, earning a Bachelor of Arts degree in economics. Prior to his political career, Valeri served as President of Canadian Financial Group Ltd. Valeri represented the ridings of Lincoln (1993–1997), then Stoney Creek (1997–2004) and Hamilton East—Stoney Creek (2004–2006). Valeri lives with his wife Terri and children, Anthony and Luca in Stoney Creek.

== Parliamentary career ==
Valeri first ran for office in the 1993 election, winning the Liberal Party nomination over former cabinet minister John Munro, and easily won in the Liberal sweep of Ontario. Valeri served as a backbencher and was appointed Parliamentary Secretary to the Minister of Finance in 1997. He was appointed to the Cabinet on December 12, 2003, by incoming Prime Minister Paul Martin.

=== 2004 nomination contest ===
In 2004, the decennial redistribution process took place and Valeri's old riding of Stoney Creek, which straddled the border between Hamilton and Grimsby, was split in two. A part of Valeri's Stoney Creek riding was merged with a part of Hamilton - East. A slight majority of the constituents of the new riding of Hamilton East - Stoney Creek were from Valeri's former riding. Although the other Hamilton-area Members of Parliament shifted to the eastward half of their ridings, in Valeri's case this would have meant shifting from a suburban Hamilton riding to the rural Niagara West—Glanbrook riding, where he would have faced a difficult battle with a candidate of the Conservative Party of Canada.

He therefore decided to run in the western half of his former riding, resulting in a passionate nomination battle with former cabinet heavyweight and party leadership candidate Sheila Copps. Some accused Martin of orchestrating these events to try to expel the left-leaning Copps from the House of Commons. On March 6, 2004, Valeri won the nomination by 311 votes. Stelco's economic troubles and the large pension deficit galvanized support for New Democratic Party (NDP) candidate Tony DePaulo in Hamilton East—Stoney Creek. The conflict with Copps, public reaction to the first budget of the Ontario Liberals, as well as the government's sinking fortunes, almost cost him his seat, but he was narrowly (less than 1,000 votes) re-elected on June 28, 2004.

=== Government House Leader ===
On July 20, 2004, he was appointed to the sensitive position of Government House Leader in Paul Martin's minority government. Valeri's appointment to the position of House Leader was originally questioned by many, however Valeri was able to establish a working relationship with his counterparts.

As noted by Libby Davies, NDP House Leader, "We had some crazy moments but we always got down to business in a real way. It was a pleasure to work with (Valeri)." Former Conservative House Leader John Reynolds noted that "Tony was a great House Leader. A man of integrity and good humour."

In his 2008 memoir, entitled Hell Or High Water: My Life In And Out of Politics (ISBN 0771056923), former Prime Minister Paul Martin labeled Valeri as “one of the most gifted House Leaders of recent times.”

=== 2006 re-election bid ===
On January 23, 2006, Valeri was narrowly defeated by a margin of less than 500 votes by the New Democratic Party candidate Wayne Marston. During the election, the Hamilton Spectator reported that Valeri had purchased a property for $225,000 only to later sell it to a Liberal supporter for $500,000 a few months later. While Valeri insisted that the Ethics Commissioner had cleared the transaction, lingering doubts about the sale remained.

== Post-political career ==
After his election defeat, Valeri established a public affairs and strategic consulting business and held a residence position within the DeGroote School of Business at McMaster University. On December 5, 2007, the Hamilton Port Authority named Valeri its interim CEO effective on December 17, 2007. He left the post in 2008.

As of June 2011, Valeri has held the position of Vice President Public Affairs at ArcelorMittal Dofasco in Hamilton.

== Electoral record ==
1993 Canadian federal election: Lincoln
Party	Candidate	Votes	%	Expenditures
Liberal	Tony Valeri	29,048	52.19	$48,491
Reform	Andy Sweck	14,325	25.74	$36,455
Progressive Conservative	Jim Merritt	8,731	15.69	$43,063
New Democratic	Peter Cassidy	2,182	3.92	$16,976
National	Brian Dolby	935	1.68	$3,164
Natural Law	Cynthia Marchand	307	0.55	$200
Independent	Ken Morningstar	128	0.23	$247
Total valid votes		55,656	100.00	
Total rejected ballots		544		
Turnout		56,200	72.08	
Electors on the lists		77,974		
Source: Thirty-fifth General Election, 1993: Official Voting Results, Published by the Chief Electoral Officer of Canada. Financial figures taken from official contributions and expenses provided by Elections Canada.

1997 Canadian federal election: Stoney Creek
Party	Candidate	Votes
Liberal	Tony Valeri	23,750
Reform	Clay Downes	10,210
Progressive Conservative	Angie Tomasic	9,440
New Democratic	Peter Cassidy	3,392
Christian Heritage	Angela M. Braun	472
Natural Law	Cynthia Marchand	261

2000 Canadian federal election: Stoney Creek
Party	Candidate	Votes
Liberal	Tony Valeri	24,150
Alliance	Doug Conley	13,354
Progressive Conservative	Grant Howell	6,102
New Democratic	Mark Davies	3,083
Canadian Action	Phil Rose	450
Marxist–Leninist	Paul Lane	137

Hamilton East—Stoney Creek - 2004 Canadian federal election
Party	Candidate	Votes	%	±%
Liberal	Tony Valeri	18,417	37.7%	
New Democratic	Tony Depaulo	17,490	35.8%	
Conservative	Fred Eisenberger	10,888	22.3%	
Green	Richard Safka	1,446	3.0%	
Independent	Sam Cino	393	0.8%	
Communist	Bob Mann	166	0.3%	

Hamilton East—Stoney Creek - 2006 Canadian federal election
Party	Candidate	Votes	%	±%
New Democratic	Wayne Marston	19,346	36.0%	+0.2%
Liberal	Tony Valeri	18,880	35.2%	-2.5%
Conservative	Frank Rukavina	13,581	25.3%	+3.0%
Green	Jo Pavlov	1,573	2.9%	-0.1%
Communist	Bob Mann	316	0.6%	+0.3%

27th Canadian Ministry (2003–2006) – Cabinet of Paul Martin
Cabinet posts (2)
Predecessor	Office	Successor
	Minister of State; 2004–2006 styled as Leader of the Government in the House of Commons	
David Collenette	Minister of Transport; 2003–2004	Jean Lapierre
Special Parliamentary Responsibilities
Predecessor	Title	Successor
Jacques Saada	Leader of the Government in the House of Commons; 2004–2006	Rob Nicholson

Preceded by Shirley Martin	Member of Parliament for Lincoln; 1993-1997	Succeeded by Redistribution
Preceded by New Riding	Member of Parliament for Stoney Creek; 1997-2004	Succeeded by Riding Merged
Preceded by New Riding	Member of Parliament for Hamilton East—Stoney Creek; 2004-2006	Succeeded by Wayne Marston
