= John Smith (Ontario MP) =

Ontario businessman and political figure

John Smith (February 18, 1894 – November 8, 1977) was an Ontario businessman and political figure. He represented Lincoln in the House of Commons of Canada as a Progressive Conservative member from 1957 to 1962.

He was born in Scotland in 1894, the son of Daniel Smith and Annie Douglas, and grew up there. Smith was a building contractor in St. Catharines. He served in the Canadian Army during World War I. In 1924, he married Jean Wood. Smith served on the city council of St. Catharines and was mayor from 1954 to 1957. He was defeated by James McNulty in the 1962 general election. He was a member of the Freemasons.

1957 Canadian federal election: Lincoln
Party	Candidate	Votes
Progressive Conservative	John Smith	25,409
Liberal	Harry Cavers	15,794
Co-operative Commonwealth	Auldham Roy Petrie	4,829
Social Credit	Howard Prentice	2,233

1958 Canadian federal election: Lincoln
Party	Candidate	Votes
Progressive Conservative	John Smith	29,958
Liberal	Harry Cavers	15,063
Co-operative Commonwealth	Auldham Roy Petrie	4,978
Social Credit	Howard Prentice	949
