= Norman Lockhart (politician) =

Canadian politician

Member of Parliament for Lincoln
- In office October 1935 – April 1949
- Preceded by: James Dew Chaplin
- Succeeded by: Harry Cavers

Personal details
- Born: Norman James Macdonald Lockhart; 10 April 1884 Dunnville, Ontario
- Died: 30 August 1974 (aged 90)
- Party: Conservative (1867–1942); Progressive Conservative
- Spouse(s): Henderson m. 28 March 1906
- Profession: merchant

Norman James Macdonald Lockhart (10 April 1884 – 30 August 1974) was a Canadian businessman and politician. Lockhart was a Conservative and Progressive Conservative party member of the House of Commons of Canada.

== Biography ==
Lockhart was born in Dunnville, Ontario and became a merchant by career.

The son of Norman Macdonald Lockhart and Charlotte Jane Blott, Lockhart attended public and high schools in Dunnville. He was a retailer of fuel and building supplies. He served on the St. Catharines, Ontario board of education from 1923 to 1934, and became the community's mayor in 1935.

He was first elected to Parliament at the Lincoln riding in the 1935 general election under the Conservative party banner and re-elected there in 1940 and 1945, during which time his party became known as the Progressive Conservatives. Lockhart did not stand for another term in office in the 1949 election.

1935 Canadian federal election: Lincoln
Party	Candidate	Votes
Conservative	Norman Lockhart	11,398
Liberal	Albert Ernest Coombs	11,135
Reconstruction	Howard L. Craise	2,349
Co-operative Commonwealth	George Pay	1,224

1940 Canadian federal election: Lincoln
Party	Candidate	Votes
National Government	Norman Lockhart	13,331
Liberal	John Joseph Bench	12,921
Co-operative Commonwealth	John Scott	2,443

1945 Canadian federal election: Lincoln
Party	Candidate	Votes
Progressive Conservative	Norman Lockhart	15,911
Liberal	Edward Frank McCordick	10,962
Co-operative Commonwealth	Allen E. Schroeder	4,540
Labor–Progressive	Thomas Wakefield Dealy	1,514
