= Edward Arthur Lancaster =

Canadian politician (1860–1916)

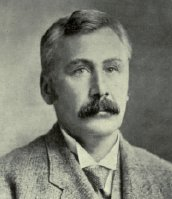
- Lancaster in 1906

Member of the Canadian Parliament for Lincoln and Niagara
- In office 1900–1904
- Preceded by: William Gibson
- Succeeded by: District abolished

Member of the Canadian Parliament for Lincoln
- In office 1904–1916
- Preceded by: District created
- Succeeded by: James Dew Chaplin

Personal details
- Born: September 22, 1860 London, England
- Died: January 4, 1916 (aged 55) St. Catharines, Ontario
- Party: Conservative

Edward Arthur Lancaster (September 22, 1860 – January 4, 1916) was a Canadian politician.

Born in London, Lancaster was educated at the Public and High Schools of London, Ontario and at Osgoode Hall. He practised law in St. Catharines. In 1885, he married Mary H.C. Pettit. A lawyer by profession, he was first returned to parliament in the general election of 1900 for the Ontario electoral district of Lincoln and Niagara. A Conservative, he was re-elected in 1904, 1908, and 1911. He died in office in 1916 in St. Catharines.

1904 Canadian federal election: Lincoln
| Party | Candidate | Votes |
|---|---|---|
| Conservative | Edward Arthur Lancaster | 3,558 |
| Liberal | E.J. Lovelace | 3,240 |

1908 Canadian federal election: Lincoln
| Party | Candidate | Votes |
|---|---|---|
| Conservative | Edward Arthur Lancaster | 3,853 |
| Liberal | Welland Devaux Woodruff | 3,604 |

1911 Canadian federal election: Lincoln
| Party | Candidate | Votes |
|---|---|---|
| Conservative | Edward Arthur Lancaster | 4,576 |
| Liberal | Edwin John Lovelace | 3,023 |
