= James Norris (Canadian politician) =

Canadian politician

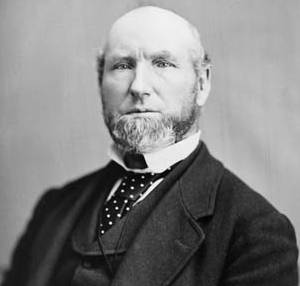
James Norris Source: Library and Archives Canada

James Norris (1809 – 1 August 1891) was an Ontario businessman and political figure. He represented Lincoln in the House of Commons of Canada as a Liberal member from 1874 to 1878.

He was born in Argyleshire, Scotland in 1809 and came to Peel County, Upper Canada with his parents around 1834. He moved to St. Catharines, where he formed a partnership with Sylvester Neelon in shipping, milling and the timber trade. After the partnership dissolved, Norris continued to be involved in transporting goods to foreign markets, primarily England. He served on the town council, serving a term as mayor. In 1847, he married Sophronia Neelon, his partner's sister; in 1863, he married Elizabeth Waud, after his first wife's death. He was first elected to the House of Commons in the 1874 federal election but was unseated after an appeal. He won the by-election that followed later that year. Norris resigned his seat in April 1877 and then was reelected in a May 1877 by-election. He ran unsuccessfully for reelection in 1878 and 1882. Norris died in St. Catharines at the age of 71.

By-election on 17 November 1874 James Norris was unseated, 8 September 1874
| Party | Candidate | Votes |
| Liberal | James Norris | 1,406 |
| Unknown | Augustus Jukes | 1,270 |
| Unknown | Reuben Wynne | 7 |

By-election on 9 May 1877 James Norris resigned, April 1877
| Party | Candidate | Votes |
| Liberal | James Norris | 1,831 |
| Unknown | James Miller | 1,746 |

1878 Canadian federal election: Lincoln
| Party | Candidate | Votes |
|---|---|---|
| Conservative | John Charles Rykert | 1,893 |
| Liberal | James Norris | 1,799 |
