= Arthur Frederick Rykert =

Canadian politician

Ontario MPP
- In office 1914–1919
- Preceded by: James McQueen
- Succeeded by: Frank Campbell Biggs
- Constituency: Wentworth North

Personal details
- Born: April 20, 1870 St. Catharines, Ontario
- Died: May 30, 1933 (aged 63) Toronto, Ontario
- Party: Conservative
- Spouse: Nellie Shaw (m. 1908)
- Occupation: Physician, coroner

Arthur Frederick Rykert (April 20, 1870 – May 30, 1933) was a physician and political figure in Ontario. He represented Wentworth North in the Legislative Assembly of Ontario from 1914 to 1919 as a Conservative member.

He was born in St. Catharines, Ontario, the son of J.C. Rykert and N.M. Hawley and the grandson of George Rykert, and was educated in St. Catharines, at Upper Canada College and at Toronto University. In 1908, Rykert married Nellie Shaw. He served as coroner for Wentworth County. Rykert died in Toronto of heart disease at the age of 63.
