= James Rea Benson =

Canadian politician

The Honourable James Rea Benson
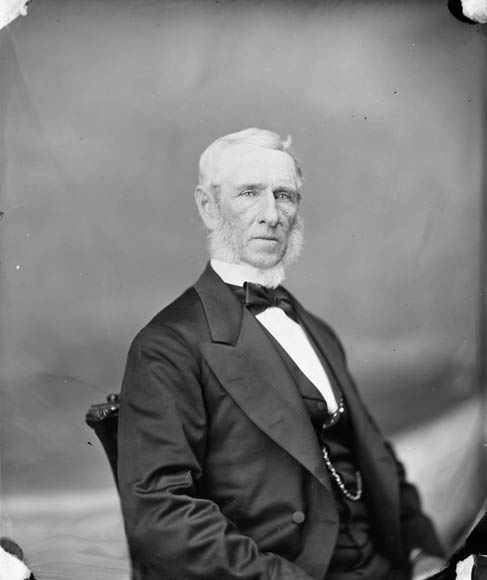

Member of Parliament for Lincoln
- In office 1867–1868
- Succeeded by: Thomas Rodman Merritt

Canadian Senator from Ontario
- In office 1868–1885
- Appointed by: John A. Macdonald

Personal details
- Born: January 21, 1807 Ireland
- Died: March 18, 1885 (aged 78) Ottawa, Ontario, Canada
- Party: Liberal-Conservative

James Rea Benson (January 21, 1807 – March 18, 1885) was a Canadian businessman and politician. He represented Lincoln in the 1st Canadian Parliament as a Liberal-Conservative member until March 14, 1868, when he was named to the Senate of Canada.

== Background ==
He was born in Ireland in 1807 and came to Kingston in Upper Canada with his family in 1819. He later moved to St. Catharines, where he was a hardware merchant, also operating mills and ships in partnership with Thomas Rodman Merritt. Benson was president of the Niagara District Bank, the Welland Loan Company and the St. Catharines Gas Company. He served on the town council for St. Catharines and on the council for Lincoln County. He died in 1885 in Ottawa while still in office.

The city of St. Catharines purchased his residence and used it for some time as the city hall.

Benson married the daughter of Charles Ingersoll. His daughter Helen married Calvin Brown, the first mayor of St. Catharines. His son Sir Frederick William Benson was a British Army officer. His niece, Mary Benson, the daughter of his brother Thomas, married Thomas Rodman Merritt.

== Electoral record ==
1867 Canadian federal election: Lincoln
Party	Candidate	Votes
Liberal–Conservative	James Rea Benson	acclaimed
