= Lincoln and Niagara =

Former federal electoral district in Ontario, Canada

Lincoln and Niagara was a federal electoral district represented in the House of Commons of Canada from 1883 to 1904. It was located in the province of Ontario. This riding was created from parts of Lincoln and Niagara ridings.

It was initially defined as consisting of the town and township of Niagara, the city of St. Catharines, the townships of Grantham, Clinton and Louth, and the villages of Beamsville, Merritton and Port Dalhousie.

In 1892, the townships of Pelham and Gainsborough were added to the riding. The townships were transferred from the defunct electoral district of Monck

The electoral district was abolished in 1903 when it was redistributed between Lincoln and Welland ridings.

== Electoral history ==
1882 Canadian federal election
Party	Candidate	Votes
Conservative	RYKERT, John C.	1,826
Unknown	NORRIS, James	1,731

1887 Canadian federal election
Party	Candidate	Votes
Conservative	RYKERT, John C.	2,655
Liberal	PATTISON, W.A.	2,168

On Mr. Rykert's resignation, 2 May 1890:

By-election on 23 May 1890
Party	Candidate	Votes
Conservative	RYKERT, John C.	acclaimed

1891 Canadian federal election
Party	Candidate	Votes
Liberal	GIBSON, William	2,212
Unknown	NEELON, Sylvester	2,164

On the election being declared void, 16 November 1891:

By-election on 28 January 1892
Party	Candidate	Votes
Liberal	GIBSON, William	acclaimed

1896 Canadian federal election
Party	Candidate	Votes
Liberal	GIBSON, William	2,945
Conservative	RYKERT, John C.	2,523

1900 Canadian federal election
Party	Candidate	Votes
Conservative	LANCASTER, Edward A.	3,120
Liberal	GIBSON, William	2,981

== See also ==
- List of Canadian electoral districts
- Historical federal electoral districts of Canada
