= Egyptian Cavalry Corps =

Mounted infantry (cavalry) corps of the Egyptian Army from 1828 to 1961

The Egyptian Cavalry Corps was the mounted corps of the Egyptian Army.

== Establishment ==
Muhammad Ali of Egypt and the Sudan created a strong standing army with modern weaponry, tactics and training. Some historians argue that Ali was fond of the Napoleonic method of military management, and the additions and new establishments to the Egyptian military were inspired by the French military itself. As Ali's army returned from the Greek War of Independence, his son and the commander of the army, Ibrahim Pasha, suggested the creation of an Egyptian Cavalry Corps. The corps was established in 1828 and a school was founded in Giza to train cavalry officers. In 1839, the Cavalry Corps had 15 regiments (8 of which were cuirassiers) scattered all over Egypt.

=== Order of Battle 1839 ===
- 1st Guards Cavalry Regiment (Latakia)
- 2nd Guards Cavalry Regiment (Besan)
- 1st Cavalry Regiment (Urfa)
- 2nd Cavalry Regiment (Zanbaqi)
- 3rd Cavalry Regiment (Alexandria)
- 4th Cavalry Regiment (Adana)
- 5th Cavalry Regiment (Alexandria)
- 6th Cavalry Regiment (Damascus)
- 7th Cavalry Regiment (Tarsus)
- 8th Cavalry Regiment (Damascus)
- 9th Cavalry Regiment (Alexandria)
- 10th Cavalry Regiment (Acre)
- 11th Cavalry Regiment (Cilicia)
- 12th Cavalry Regiment (Tarsus)
- 13th Cavalry Regiment (Urfa)

== Order of Battle 1853 ==
- Guards Cavalry Brigade (Selim Pasha):
  - 1st Guards Cavalry Regiment: (1338 cavalrymen - Khurshid Bek)
  - 2nd Guards Cavalry Regiment: (1338 troops - Muhammad Bek)
- 1st Cavalry Regiment: (1288 troops - Ibrahim Bek)
- 2nd Cavalry Regiment: (1152 troops - Muhammad Bek)
- 3rd Cavalry Regiment: (830 troops - Shaheen Bek)
- 4th Cavalry Regiment: (1095 troops - Osman Bek)
- 5th Cavalry Regiment: (867 troops - Muhammad Bek)
- 6th Cavalry Regiment: (1359 troops - Hussein Bek)
- 7th Cavalry Regiment: (851 troops - unknown)
- 8th Cavalry Regiment: (768 troops - Ali Fahmi Bek)
- 9th Cavalry Regiment: (742 troops - Ali Reda Bek)

=== The Cavalry School in Giza ===
In his book, Antoine Clot Bey mentioned that the formation of the cavalry units in the Egyptian army were not formed according to the new system until after the army's return from the Greek War of Independence because during this war, Ibrahim Pasha had witnessed the cavalry system of France and realised the importance of cavalry organisation. After his return to Egypt, he began to form cavalry units based on the European system, and several European teachers were hired for this purpose.

The Military Academy of Cavalry was established in Giza at Mourad Bey Palace, which was turned into a cavalry barracks. The school was organised by Monsieur Varane, who was from the officers of the Napoleonic Empire including Yawar, Marshal Gouvion and his subordinate in-training officers, who were learning about cavalry manoeuvres and infantry movements.

The school used to follow the system of the Somme Military School in France, except for some minor modifications that were required by the local conditions. Young Egyptians and Turks graduated as officers of the Cavalry Corps.

Marshal Marmon visited this school in 1834, and there were 360 trainees in it, and he admired it and wrote about it on his journey:

"When I saw these students in the field carrying out manoeuvres, I imagined that I was in front of a line of the finest verses in our horses. While the school was lacking to reach a degree of perfection, some lessons in language, drawing, and so forth, but there is no dispute that it is from the side of organising the cavalry teams, it lacks nothing, The students are good at riding horses, the manoeuvres they perform take place with lightness, accuracy and wisdom, their system and their best regret, and their morale is fine, they are soldiers with all the meanings of the word, and the trumpet bearers perform their work with perfection. "

== Post Anglo-Egyptian War ==
After the Anglo-Egyptian war, the Egyptian Military High Command was controlled by British generals and was downsized until it became a homeland defence. The Cavalry Corps was split into battalions instead of regiments. Its main engagement after the war was the long-running Mahdist War.

== Modernisation ==
A few years after the war, Egypt ended the British Protectorate and a Kingdom under the rule of Fuad I was established. Fuad's administration began to modernise everything in the country including the economy, military, education, etc. The military modernisation was focused on mechanisation, building new military schools and mobilising more men and re-establishing units. In 1928, the corps' name was changed to Royal Egyptian Cavalry Corps. The mechanisation process went totally on the Egyptian Cavalry Corps where many of its units (except the Royal Guards) replaced its traditional horse formations with Armoured Vehicles and Tanks. By the early 1940s, nearly all of the corps was mechanised except for some battalions that served as gendarmerie and used horses.
