= William Andres =

Canadian politician

Member of Parliament for Lincoln
- In office 1974–1979

Personal details
- Born: August 2, 1925 Ukrainian Soviet Socialist Republic
- Died: September 23, 2010 (aged 85) Canada
- Party: Liberal (1974–1988), Christian Heritage Party of Canada (1988–)
- Profession: farmer

William "Bill" Andres, Jr. (August 2, 1925 – September 23, 2010) was a Canadian politician and farmer. He was elected to the House of Commons of Canada in the 1974 election as a member of the Liberal Party to represent the Ontario riding of Lincoln. He served as Parliamentary Secretary to the Minister of State (Multiculturalism) between 1977 and 1979. He was also a member of various standing committees. Due to re-distribution, he ran in St. Catharines riding in the 1979 election and was defeated. He ran in Niagara Falls as a candidate for the Christian Heritage Party of Canada in the 1988 federal election and was also defeated.

1974 Canadian federal election: Lincoln
Party	Candidate	Votes
Liberal	William Andres	17,499
Progressive Conservative	Kenneth Higson	14,221
New Democratic	Ron Leavens	6,548
Social Credit	James Robert Walters	611
