= Lincoln (federal electoral district) =

Former federal electoral district in Ontario, Canada

Ontario electoral district

Defunct federal electoral district
- Legislature: House of Commons
- District created: 1867, 1903
- District abolished: 1882, 1996
- First contested: 1867
- Last contested: 1993

Lincoln was a federal electoral district represented in the House of Commons of Canada from 1867 to 1883 and from 1904 to 1997. It was on the Niagara Peninsula in the Canadian province of Ontario. At various times, there was also an electoral district of the same name used in provincial elections.

At various times, the riding included all or parts of the former Lincoln County (including its successor, the Regional Municipality of Niagara). After 1976, it also represented parts of the Regional Municipality of Hamilton-Wentworth, mainly Stoney Creek. As a suburban riding of Hamilton, it tended to vote Conservative much more often than the city proper.

By the 1997 election, the riding borders and name were changed to Stoney Creek although it included many areas outside that city.

== Geography ==
It initially consisted of the Townships of Clinton, Grantham, Grimsby, and Louth, and the Town of St. Catharines. It was abolished in 1882 when it was redistributed between Lincoln and Niagara and Wentworth South ridings.

It was recreated from those two ridings in 1903, and defined as consisting of the County of Lincoln.

In 1947, it was defined as consisting of the county of Lincoln, including the city of St. Catharines.

In 1966, it was defined as consisting of

(a) in the County of Lincoln, the southeast part of the City of St. Catharines, and the Townships of Caistor, Clinton, Gainsborough, Grimsby North, Grimsby South, Louth and Niagara;

(b) in the County of Welland, the Townships of Pelham and Thorold.

In 1976, it was defined as consisting of:

(a) in the Regional Municipality of Hamilton-Wentworth, the Town of Stoney Creek and the part of the City of Hamilton east of Red Hill Creek between Windermere Road in the north and the brow of the Mountain and the limit of the City of Hamilton in the south, and (b) in the Regional Municipality of Niagara, the Towns of Grimsby and Lincoln.

In 1987, the City of Hamilton part of the ridings was redefined to consist of the part of the city south of Queenston Road, east of Redhill Creek and north of the brow of the Niagara Escarpment.

It was abolished in 1996 when it was redistributed between Erie—Lincoln and Stoney Creek ridings.

== Members of Parliament ==
This riding has elected the following members of Parliament:

| Parliament | Years | Member | Party |
|---|---|---|---|
| 1st | 1867–1868 | James Rea Benson | Liberal–Conservative |
| 1st | 1868–1872 | Thomas Rodman Merritt | Liberal |
| 2nd | 1872–1874 | Thomas Rodman Merritt | Liberal |
| 3rd | 1874–1874 | James Norris | Liberal |
| 3rd | 1874–1877 | James Norris | Liberal |
| 3rd | 1877–1878 | James Norris | Liberal |
| 4th | 1878–1882 | John Charles Rykert | Conservative |
Riding dissolved into Lincoln and Niagara and Wentworth South
Riding re-created from Lincoln and Niagara and Wentworth South
| 10th | 1904–1908 | Edward Arthur Lancaster | Conservative |
| 11th | 1908–1911 | Edward Arthur Lancaster | Conservative |
| 12th | 1911–1917 | Edward Arthur Lancaster | Conservative |
| 13th | 1917–1921 | James Dew Chaplin | Government (Unionist) |
| 14th | 1921–1925 | James Dew Chaplin | Conservative |
| 15th | 1925–1926 | James Dew Chaplin | Conservative |
| 16th | 1926–1930 | James Dew Chaplin | Conservative |
| 17th | 1930–1935 | James Dew Chaplin | Conservative |
| 18th | 1935–1940 | Norman Lockhart | Conservative |
| 19th | 1940–1945 | Norman Lockhart | National Government |
| 20th | 1945–1949 | Norman Lockhart | Progressive Conservative |
| 21st | 1949–1953 | Harry Cavers | Liberal |
| 22nd | 1953–1957 | Harry Cavers | Liberal |
| 23rd | 1957–1958 | John Smith | Progressive Conservative |
| 24th | 1958–1962 | John Smith | Progressive Conservative |
| 25th | 1962–1963 | James McNulty | Liberal |
| 26th | 1963–1965 | James McNulty | Liberal |
| 27th | 1965–1968 | James McNulty | Liberal |
| 28th | 1968–1972 | H. Gordon Barrett | Liberal |
| 29th | 1972–1974 | Kenneth Higson | Progressive Conservative |
| 30th | 1974–1979 | William Andres | Liberal |
| 31st | 1979–1980 | Kenneth Higson | Progressive Conservative |
| 32nd | 1980–1984 | Bryce Mackasey | Liberal |
| 33rd | 1984–1988 | Shirley Martin | Progressive Conservative |
| 34th | 1988–1993 | Shirley Martin | Progressive Conservative |
| 35th | 1993–1997 | Tony Valeri | Liberal |
Riding dissolved into Erie—Lincoln and Stoney Creek

== Electoral history ==
=== Lincoln, 1867–1882 ===
1867 Canadian federal election
| Party | Candidate | Votes |
|---|---|---|
| Liberal–Conservative | James Rea Benson | acclaimed |

By-election on 13 April 1868 James Benson called to the Senate, 14 March 1868
| Party | Candidate | Votes |
| Liberal | Thomas Rodman Merritt | 720 |
| Unknown | O.S. Phillips | 120 |

1872 Canadian federal election
| Party | Candidate | Votes |
|---|---|---|
| Liberal | Thomas Rodman Merritt | 1,118 |
| Unknown | J. McKowins | 555 |

1874 Canadian federal election
| Party | Candidate | Votes |
|---|---|---|
| Liberal | James Norris | 1,493 |
| Unknown | T. Clark | 1,338 |

By-election on 17 November 1874 James Norris was unseated, 8 September 1874
| Party | Candidate | Votes |
| Liberal | James Norris | 1,406 |
| Unknown | Augustus Jukes | 1,270 |
| Unknown | Reuben Wynne | 7 |

By-election on 9 May 1877 James Norris resigned, April 1877
| Party | Candidate | Votes |
| Liberal | James Norris | 1,831 |
| Unknown | James Miller | 1,746 |

1878 Canadian federal election
| Party | Candidate | Votes |
|---|---|---|
| Conservative | John Charles Rykert | 1,893 |
| Liberal | James Norris | 1,799 |

=== Lincoln, 1904–1997 ===
1904 Canadian federal election
| Party | Candidate | Votes |
|---|---|---|
| Conservative | Edward Arthur Lancaster | 3,558 |
| Liberal | E.J. Lovelace | 3,240 |

1908 Canadian federal election
| Party | Candidate | Votes |
|---|---|---|
| Conservative | Edward Arthur Lancaster | 3,853 |
| Liberal | Welland Devaux Woodruff | 3,604 |

1911 Canadian federal election
| Party | Candidate | Votes |
|---|---|---|
| Conservative | Edward Arthur Lancaster | 4,576 |
| Liberal | Edwin John Lovelace | 3,023 |

1917 Canadian federal election
| Party | Candidate | Votes |
|---|---|---|
| Government (Unionist) | James Dew Chaplin | 9,335 |
| Opposition (Laurier Liberals) | Edwin John Lovelace | 3,816 |

1921 Canadian federal election
| Party | Candidate | Votes |
|---|---|---|
| Conservative | James Dew Chaplin | 8,087 |
| Labour | Edwin John Lovelace | 6,212 |
| Progressive | Arthur Adams Craise | 3,066 |

1925 Canadian federal election
| Party | Candidate | Votes |
|---|---|---|
| Conservative | James Dew Chaplin | 12,054 |
| Liberal | Hamilton Killally Woodruff | 5,942 |

1926 Canadian federal election
| Party | Candidate | Votes |
|---|---|---|
| Conservative | James Dew Chaplin | 11,475 |
| Liberal | Terrence Myles Mccarron | 5,555 |

1930 Canadian federal election
| Party | Candidate | Votes |
|---|---|---|
| Conservative | James Dew Chaplin | 13,474 |
| Liberal | May Louise Greenwood | 7,526 |

1935 Canadian federal election
| Party | Candidate | Votes |
|---|---|---|
| Conservative | Norman Lockhart | 11,398 |
| Liberal | Albert Ernest Coombs | 11,135 |
| Reconstruction | Howard L. Craise | 2,349 |
| Co-operative Commonwealth | George Pay | 1,224 |

1940 Canadian federal election
| Party | Candidate | Votes |
|---|---|---|
| National Government | Norman Lockhart | 13,331 |
| Liberal | John Joseph Bench | 12,921 |
| Co-operative Commonwealth | John Scott | 2,443 |

1945 Canadian federal election
| Party | Candidate | Votes |
|---|---|---|
| Progressive Conservative | Norman Lockhart | 15,911 |
| Liberal | Edward Frank McCordick | 10,962 |
| Co-operative Commonwealth | Allen E. Schroeder | 4,540 |
| Labor–Progressive | Thomas Wakefield Dealy | 1,514 |

1949 Canadian federal election
| Party | Candidate | Votes |
|---|---|---|
| Liberal | Harry Cavers | 17,407 |
| Progressive Conservative | C. Bruce Hill | 14,038 |
| Co-operative Commonwealth | Allen Eugene Schroeder | 5,793 |
| Independent | Howard Prentice | 742 |

1953 Canadian federal election
| Party | Candidate | Votes |
|---|---|---|
| Liberal | Harry Cavers | 16,113 |
| Progressive Conservative | Romaine Kay Ross | 14,694 |
| Co-operative Commonwealth | Ralph H. Frayne | 4,575 |
| Christian Liberal | Howard A. Prentice | 1,505 |

1957 Canadian federal election
| Party | Candidate | Votes |
|---|---|---|
| Progressive Conservative | John Smith | 25,409 |
| Liberal | Harry Cavers | 15,794 |
| Co-operative Commonwealth | Auldham Roy Petrie | 4,829 |
| Social Credit | Howard Prentice | 2,233 |

1958 Canadian federal election
| Party | Candidate | Votes |
|---|---|---|
| Progressive Conservative | John Smith | 29,958 |
| Liberal | Harry Cavers | 15,063 |
| Co-operative Commonwealth | Auldham Roy Petrie | 4,978 |
| Social Credit | Howard Prentice | 949 |

1962 Canadian federal election
| Party | Candidate | Votes |
|---|---|---|
| Liberal | James C. McNulty | 23,386 |
| Progressive Conservative | John Smith | 20,445 |
| Social Credit | Herbert Heppner | 5,262 |
| New Democratic | Rose Cookson | 5,130 |

1963 Canadian federal election
| Party | Candidate | Votes |
|---|---|---|
| Liberal | James C. McNulty | 25,902 |
| Progressive Conservative | Romaine K. Ross | 21,345 |
| New Democratic | Rose Cookson | 5,315 |
| Social Credit | James R. Walters | 2,841 |

1965 Canadian federal election
| Party | Candidate | Votes |
|---|---|---|
| Liberal | James C. McNulty | 25,820 |
| Progressive Conservative | Joe Reid | 19,324 |
| New Democratic | Arthur Matti Peltomaa | 8,395 |
| Social Credit | George S. Mallory | 1,913 |

1968 Canadian federal election
| Party | Candidate | Votes |
|---|---|---|
| Liberal | H. Gordon Barrett | 13,328 |
| Progressive Conservative | Kenneth Higson | 12,692 |
| New Democratic | John Martin | 6,763 |

1972 Canadian federal election
| Party | Candidate | Votes |
|---|---|---|
| Progressive Conservative | Kenneth Higson | 16,840 |
| Liberal | H. Gordon Barrett | 13,562 |
| New Democratic | Ron Leavens | 6,714 |
| Social Credit | Jim Walters | 612 |

1974 Canadian federal election
| Party | Candidate | Votes |
|---|---|---|
| Liberal | William Andres | 17,499 |
| Progressive Conservative | Kenneth Higson | 14,221 |
| New Democratic | Ron Leavens | 6,548 |
| Social Credit | James Robert Walters | 611 |

1979 Canadian federal election
| Party | Candidate | Votes |
|---|---|---|
| Progressive Conservative | Kenneth Higson | 19,612 |
| Liberal | Norm Marshall | 15,026 |
| New Democratic | Ken Lee | 13,400 |
| Marxist–Leninist | Don McLean | 151 |

1980 Canadian federal election
| Party | Candidate | Votes |
|---|---|---|
| Liberal | Bryce Mackasey | 17,449 |
| Progressive Conservative | Kenneth Higson | 16,741 |
| New Democratic | Kenneth I. Lee | 13,500 |
| Marxist–Leninist | Don McLean | 133 |

1984 Canadian federal election
| Party | Candidate | Votes |
|---|---|---|
| Progressive Conservative | Shirley Martin | 26,318 |
| Liberal | Joseph Macaluso | 14,646 |
| New Democratic | John Mayer | 11,888 |
| Green | Robert A. Keddy | 345 |
| Independent | Larry E. Johnston | 171 |
| Independent | Ann Stasiuk | 121 |
| Social Credit | A. J. Sid Hamelin | 120 |

1988 Canadian federal election
| Party | Candidate | Votes |
|---|---|---|
| Progressive Conservative | Shirley Martin | 19,955 |
| Liberal | John Munro | 19,517 |
| New Democratic | John Mayer | 9,037 |
| Christian Heritage | Peggy Humby | 2,742 |
| Independent | Albert Papazian | 280 |
| Independent | David Olchowecki | 76 |
| Independent | Ann Stasiuk | 67 |
| Independent | André Vachon | 28 |

1993 Canadian federal election
| Party | Candidate | Votes | % | Expenditures |
|---|---|---|---|---|
| Liberal | Tony Valeri | 29,048 | 52.19 | $48,491 |
| Reform | Andy Sweck | 14,325 | 25.74 | $36,455 |
| Progressive Conservative | Jim Merritt | 8,731 | 15.69 | $43,063 |
| New Democratic | Peter Cassidy | 2,182 | 3.92 | $16,976 |
| National | Brian Dolby | 935 | 1.68 | $3,164 |
| Natural Law | Cynthia Marchand | 307 | 0.55 | $200 |
| Independent | Ken Morningstar | 128 | 0.23 | $247 |
| Total valid votes | | 55,656 | 100.00 | |
| Total rejected ballots | | 544 | | |
| Turnout | | 56,200 | 72.08 | |
| Electors on the lists | | 77,974 | | |
Source: Thirty-fifth General Election, 1993: Official Voting Results, Published by the Chief Electoral Officer of Canada. Financial figures taken from official contributions and expenses provided by Elections Canada.

== See also ==
- List of Canadian electoral districts
- Historical federal electoral districts of Canada
