= Stoney Creek (electoral district) =

Former federal electoral district in Ontario, Canada

Ontario electoral district

Defunct federal electoral district
- Legislature: House of Commons
- District created: 1996
- District abolished: 2003
- First contested: 1997
- Last contested: 2000

For the defunct provincial electoral district, see Stoney Creek (provincial electoral district)

Stoney Creek was an electoral district in Ontario, Canada, that was represented in the House of Commons of Canada from 1997 to 2003. It was located in the Hamilton area of Southern Ontario. The riding was created in 1996 from parts of Hamilton—Wentworth and Lincoln ridings.

It consisted of the City of Stoney Creek, the Township of Glanbrook, and the southeast part of the City of Hamilton, and the Town of Grimsby.

The electoral district was abolished in 2003 when it was redistributed between Hamilton East—Stoney Creek, Hamilton Mountain and Niagara West—Glanbrook ridings.

== Members of Parliament ==
This riding has elected the following members of Parliament:

Parliament	Years	Member	Party
Riding created from Hamilton—Wentworth and Lincoln
36th	1997–2000	Tony Valeri	Liberal
37th	2000–2004	Tony Valeri	Liberal
Riding dissolved into Hamilton East—Stoney Creek, Hamilton Mountain and Niagara West—Glanbrook

== Federal election results ==
1997 Canadian federal election
Party	Candidate	Votes
Liberal	Tony Valeri	23,750
Reform	Clay Downes	10,210
Progressive Conservative	Angie Tomasic	9,440
New Democratic	Peter Cassidy	3,392
Christian Heritage	Angela M. Braun	472
Natural Law	Cynthia Marchand	261

2000 Canadian federal election
Party	Candidate	Votes
Liberal	Tony Valeri	24,150
Alliance	Doug Conley	13,354
Progressive Conservative	Grant Howell	6,102
New Democratic	Mark Davies	3,083
Canadian Action	Phil Rose	450
Marxist–Leninist	Paul Lane	137

== See also ==
- List of Canadian electoral districts
- Historical federal electoral districts of Canada
