= Thomas Rodman Merritt =

Canadian politician

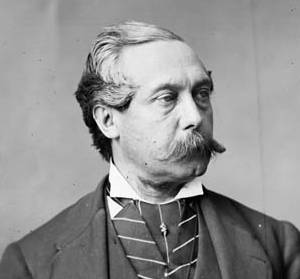
Thomas Rodman Merritt Source: Library and Archives Canada

Thomas Rodman Merritt (October 17, 1824 – January 11, 1906) was a Canadian businessman and political figure in Upper Canada, later Ontario, Canada. He represented Lincoln in the House of Commons of Canada as a Liberal member from 1868 to 1874.

He was born at his maternal grandparents’ home in Mayville, New York in 1824, the son of William Hamilton Merritt. He studied at Upper Canada College in Toronto and Grantham Academy in St. Catharines. In 1839, he was working at a store in St. Catharines. In 1843, he opened a general store there in partnership with James Rea Benson. The partners bought flour mills and had two ships built to transport flour. The partnership split up in 1849 and Merritt kept the mills and ships. In 1850, he set up a shipping line that transported goods to Brantford and returned to St. Catharines with wheat. In 1853, he married Mary Benson, the daughter of his former partner's brother Thomas Benson .

Merritt served on the St. Catharines town council from 1857 to 1859. He was elected in an 1868 by-election to represent Lincoln in the House of Commons and was reelected in 1872. In 1869, his mills and ships were sold to the firm of Norris and Neelon. Merritt served as vice-president of the Niagara District Bank and became vice-president of the Imperial Bank of Canada after the two banks merged. He was also president of several companies in the area, including the Niagara Falls Suspension Bridge Company and the St Catharines Gas Light Company. He retired from politics in 1874. He helped found Bishop Ridley College at St. Catharines and served as president from 1888 to 1899. He died in St. Catharines in 1906.

His former home, Rodman Hall (built 1857-1863), later served as a private school and as an art gallery from 1960 to 2020 (acquired by Brock University in 2003. Since 2023 it operates as a boutique hotels and events centre.

By-election on 13 April 1868 James Benson called to the Senate, 14 March 1868
Party	Candidate	Votes
Liberal	Thomas Rodman Merritt	720
Unknown	O.S. Phillips	120

1872 Canadian federal election: Lincoln
Party	Candidate	Votes
Liberal	Thomas Rodman Merritt	1,118
Unknown	J. McKowins	555
