= Harry Cavers =

Canadian politician

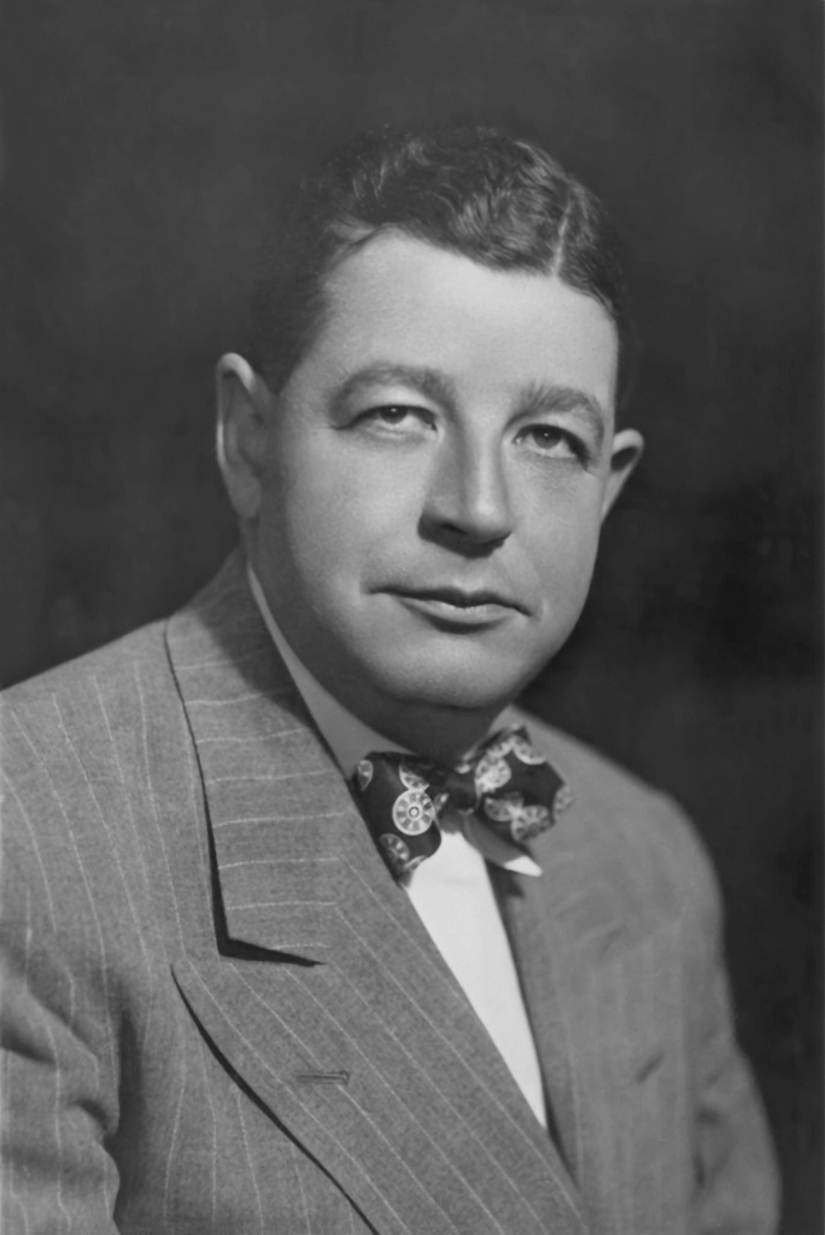

Member of Parliament for Lincoln
- In office 27 June 1949 – 9 June 1957
- Preceded by: Norman Lockhart
- Succeeded by: John Smith

Personal details
- Born: Harry Peter Cavers; 27 December 1909 St. Catharines, Ontario
- Died: 7 December 1995 (aged 85) St. Catharines, Ontario
- Party: Liberal
- Spouse: Dorothy Alma Bastedo
- Profession: barrister, judge

Harry Peter Cavers (27 December 1909 – 7 December 1995) was a Liberal party member of the House of Commons of Canada, barrister and judge. He was born in St. Catharines, Ontario.

The son of Harry A. Cavers and Mabel Laura Lyons, he was educated in St. Catharines and at the University of Toronto and Osgoode Hall. Cavers was called to the Ontario bar in 1935 and practised law in St. Catharines. He was named Queen's Counsel in 1961. Cavers served as a lieutenant in the Royal Canadian Naval Volunteer Reserve from 1942 to 1945.

He was first elected at the Lincoln riding in the 1949 general election then re-elected in 1953. Cavers was defeated at Lincoln in the 1957 election by John Smith of the Progressive Conservative party. Cavers made one further campaign for federal office in 1958 in an unsuccessful attempt to unseat Smith at Lincoln.

Cavers became a Dufferin County judge after he left the House of Commons. He died on 7 December 1995.

1949 Canadian federal election: Lincoln
Party	Candidate	Votes
Liberal	Harry Cavers	17,407
Progressive Conservative	C. Bruce Hill	14,038
Co-operative Commonwealth	Allen Eugene Schroeder	5,793
Independent	Howard Prentice	742

1953 Canadian federal election: Lincoln
Party	Candidate	Votes
Liberal	Harry Cavers	16,113
Progressive Conservative	Romaine Kay Ross	14,694
Co-operative Commonwealth	Ralph H. Frayne	4,575
Christian Liberal	Howard A. Prentice	1,505

1957 Canadian federal election: Lincoln
Party	Candidate	Votes
Progressive Conservative	John Smith	25,409
Liberal	Harry Cavers	15,794
Co-operative Commonwealth	Auldham Roy Petrie	4,829
Social Credit	Howard Prentice	2,233

1958 Canadian federal election: Lincoln
Party	Candidate	Votes
Progressive Conservative	John Smith	29,958
Liberal	Harry Cavers	15,063
Co-operative Commonwealth	Auldham Roy Petrie	4,978
Social Credit	Howard Prentice	949
