= James McNulty (Canadian politician) =

Canadian politician

James Carroll Patrick McNulty
- Official 1968 portrait

Member of Parliament for Lincoln
- In office June 1962 – June 1968

Member of Parliament for St. Catharines
- In office June 1968 – September 1972

Personal details
- Born: 16 August 1918 Belleville, Ontario, Canada
- Died: 2 April 2011 (aged 92)
- Party: Liberal
- Spouse: Helen Margaret Kelly
- Profession: administrator, teacher

James Carroll Patrick McNulty (16 August 1918 – 2 April 2011) was a Liberal party member of the House of Commons of Canada. He was an administrator and teacher by career.

The son of Joseph and Monica (née MacDonald) McNulty, he attended the University of Toronto, McMaster University, the Hamilton College of Education and the Ottawa College of Education. He was a schoolteacher in St. Catharines. In 1944, he married Helen Margaret Kelly.

McNulty served on the council for Grantham Township from 1957 to 1958, on the council for Lincoln County in 1959, as deputy reeve for Grantham township in 1959 and on the city council for St. Catharines from 1960 to 1962.

He was first elected at the Lincoln riding in the 1962 general election and was re-elected there in 1963 and 1965. In the 1968 federal election, he was re-elected at the newly configured St. Catharines riding. After completing his final House of Commons term, the 28th Canadian Parliament, McNulty was defeated at St. Catharines in the 1972 election by J. Trevor Morgan of the Progressive Conservative party.

From 1968 to 1970, he was Parliamentary Secretary to Bryce Mackasey, then the Minister of Labour.

1962 Canadian federal election: Lincoln
Party	Candidate	Votes
Liberal	James C. McNulty	23,386
Progressive Conservative	John Smith	20,445
Social Credit	Herbert Heppner	5,262
New Democratic	Rose Cookson	5,130

1963 Canadian federal election: Lincoln
Party	Candidate	Votes
Liberal	James C. McNulty	25,902
Progressive Conservative	Romaine K. Ross	21,345
New Democratic	Rose Cookson	5,315
Social Credit	James R. Walters	2,841

1965 Canadian federal election: Lincoln
Party	Candidate	Votes
Liberal	James C. McNulty	25,820
Progressive Conservative	Joe Reid	19,324
New Democratic	Arthur Matti Peltomaa	8,395
Social Credit	George S. Mallory	1,913

== Death ==
McNulty died from cancer at the age of 92.
