= James Dew Chaplin =

Canadian politician

The Hon. James Dew Chaplin

Member of the Canadian Parliament for Lincoln
- In office 1917–1935
- Preceded by: Edward Arthur Lancaster
- Succeeded by: Norman Lockhart

Personal details
- Born: March 20, 1863 Toronto, Canada West
- Died: August 23, 1937 (aged 74) St. Catharines, Ontario, Canada
- Party: Conservative
- Relations: Alexander Dew Chaplin, brother
- Children: Gordon Chaplin; Edna Anderson, Granddaughter
- Cabinet: Minister of Trade and Commerce (1926)

James Dew Chaplin, PC (March 20, 1863 – August 23, 1937) was a Canadian politician.

Born in Toronto, Canada West, the son of William Lamont Chaplin and Harriet Dew, Chaplin was educated at the Public Schools and St. Catharines Collegiate Institute. A manufacturer in St. Catharines, Ontario, he was president of the Chaplin Wheel Company, Canada Axe and Harvest Tool Company, and the Wallingford Manufacturing Company. Chaplin served four years as a member of St. Catharines city council.

He was first elected to the House of Commons of Canada representing the riding of Lincoln in the 1917 federal election. A Conservative, he was re-elected in 1921, 1925, 1926, and 1930. In 1926, he was the Minister of Trade and Commerce in the short lived cabinet of Arthur Meighen.

In 1888, Chaplin married Edna Elizabeth Burgess. He died in St. Catharines at the age of 74.

His brother Alexander Dew, his son Gordon and his granddaughter Edna Anderson also served in the House of Commons.

1917 Canadian federal election: Lincoln
Party	Candidate	Votes
Government (Unionist)	James Dew Chaplin	9,335
Opposition (Laurier Liberals)	Edwin John Lovelace	3,816

1921 Canadian federal election: Lincoln
Party	Candidate	Votes
Conservative	James Dew Chaplin	8,087
Labour	Edwin John Lovelace	6,212
Progressive	Arthur Adams Craise	3,066

1925 Canadian federal election: Lincoln
Party	Candidate	Votes
Conservative	James Dew Chaplin	12,054
Liberal	Hamilton Killally Woodruff	5,942

1926 Canadian federal election: Lincoln
Party	Candidate	Votes
Conservative	James Dew Chaplin	11,475
Liberal	Terrence Myles Mccarron	5,555

1930 Canadian federal election
Party	Candidate	Votes
Conservative	James Dew Chaplin	13,474
Liberal	May Louise Greenwood	7,526
