= Kenneth Higson =

Canadian politician

Kenneth James Higson

Member of Parliament for Lincoln
- In office October 1972 – July 1974

Member of Parliament for Lincoln
- In office May 1979 – December 1979

Personal details
- Born: 14 March 1934 London, England
- Died: 22 September 1988 (aged 54)
- Party: Progressive Conservative
- Profession: barrister and solicitor, lawyer

Kenneth James Higson (14 March 1934 – 22 September 1988) was a Progressive Conservative party member of the House of Commons of Canada. He was born in London, England, and followed a legal career.

He represented the Lincoln electoral district on two occasions, following election victories in the 1972 and 1979 federal elections. He served in the 29th and 31st Canadian Parliaments, but was defeated in other elections (1968, 1974 and 1980).

1968 Canadian federal election: Lincoln
Party	Candidate	Votes
Liberal	H. Gordon Barrett	13,328
Progressive Conservative	Kenneth Higson	12,692
New Democratic	John Martin	6,763

1972 Canadian federal election: Lincoln
Party	Candidate	Votes
Progressive Conservative	Kenneth Higson	16,840
Liberal	H. Gordon Barrett	13,562
New Democratic	Ron Leavens	6,714
Social Credit	Jim Walters	612

1974 Canadian federal election: Lincoln
Party	Candidate	Votes
Liberal	William Andres	17,499
Progressive Conservative	Kenneth Higson	14,221
New Democratic	Ron Leavens	6,548
Social Credit	James Robert Walters	611

1979 Canadian federal election: Lincoln
Party	Candidate	Votes
Progressive Conservative	Kenneth Higson	19,612
Liberal	Norm Marshall	15,026
New Democratic	Ken Lee	13,400
Marxist–Leninist	Don McLean	151

1980 Canadian federal election: Lincoln
Party	Candidate	Votes
Liberal	Bryce Mackasey	17,449
Progressive Conservative	Kenneth Higson	16,741
New Democratic	Kenneth I. Lee	13,500
Marxist–Leninist	Don McLean	133
