= J. Trevor Morgan =

Canadian politician

Member of Parliament for St. Catharines
- In office October 1972 – May 1974

Personal details
- Born: 27 December 1923 Regina, Saskatchewan
- Died: 19 October 1989 (aged 65) St. Catharines, Ontario
- Party: Progressive Conservative
- Profession: barrister, lawyer

J. Trevor Morgan (27 December 1923 – 19 October 1989) was a Progressive Conservative party member of the House of Commons of Canada. He was born in Regina, Saskatchewan and became a barrister and lawyer by career.

In 1954, Morgan became a councillor for Port Dalhousie, Ontario, then became that municipality's Reeve from 1956 to 1960. Between 1962 and 1968, he was an Alderman in St. Catharines, then between 1969 and 1972 was a councillor for the Niagara Region.

He was first elected at the St. Catharines riding in the 1972 general election. After serving his term in the 29th Canadian Parliament, Morgan was defeated at St. Catharines by Gilbert Parent of the Liberal party in the 1974 federal election. He was also the first blind MP for Canada.

Having only 3 per cent of normal vision, Morgan required the use of a guide dog for his Parliamentary duties. He developed degenerative eye disease at age 13, and registered with CNIB by age 20, yet attended Queen's University and Osgoode Hall Law School.
