= John Joseph Bench =

Canadian lawyer and politician

John Joseph (Joe) Bench, KC, (May 1, 1905 – December 9, 1947) was a Canadian lawyer and senator.

He graduated from Osgoode Hall Law School in 1928 and was called to the bar the same year. He was named King's Counsel at the age of 33, the youngest in the British Empire.

Bench was appointed to the Senate of Canada on November 19, 1942 by William Lyon Mackenzie King and, at 37, was Canada's youngest Senator when he first sat in the Upper House. A Liberal he ran for election to the House of Commons of Canada in 1940 but was defeated in the riding of Lincoln.

Bench became active in the St. Catharines, Ontario community and served as president of the local chamber of commerce as well as chairman of the separate school board.

He was a member of the Canadian Army reserves with the rank of captain. He had served in the Canadian militia prior to World War I and enlisted in the Army at the beginning of World War II but was dismissed as physically unfit.

As a Senator, Bench called for the legalization of margarine in Canada. he was appointed to sit on the National War Labour Board in 1943.

Bench died at the age of 42 after suffering a heart attack.
