= Bryce Mackasey =

Canadian politician

The Honourable Bryce Mackasey PC
- Official 1980 portrait

Minister of Consumer and Corporate Affairs
- In office April 8, 1976 – September 13, 1976
- Prime Minister: Pierre Trudeau
- Preceded by: André Ouellet
- Succeeded by: Tony Abbott

Postmaster General of Canada
- In office August 8, 1974 – September 13, 1976
- Prime Minister: Pierre Trudeau
- Preceded by: André Ouellet
- Succeeded by: Jean-Jacques Blais

Minister of Manpower and Immigration
- In office January 28, 1972 – November 26, 1972
- Prime Minister: Pierre Trudeau
- Preceded by: Otto Lang
- Succeeded by: Bob Andras

Minister of Labour
- In office July 5, 1968 – January 27, 1972
- Prime Minister: Pierre Trudeau
- Preceded by: Jean-Luc Pépin
- Succeeded by: Martin O'Connell

Minister without portfolio
- In office February 9, 1968 – July 4, 1968
- Prime Minister: Lester B. Pearson; Pierre Trudeau

Member of Parliament for Lincoln
- In office February 18, 1980 – September 3, 1984
- Preceded by: Ken Higson
- Succeeded by: Shirley Martin

Member of the National Assembly of Quebec for Notre-Dame-de-Grâce
- In office November 15, 1976 – April 25, 1978
- Preceded by: William Tetley
- Succeeded by: Reed Scowen

Member of Parliament for Verdun
- In office June 18, 1962 – October 27, 1976
- Preceded by: Ken Higson
- Succeeded by: Shirley Martin

Personal details
- Born: Bryce Stuart Mackasey; August 25, 1921 Quebec City, Quebec, Canada
- Died: September 5, 1999 (aged 78) Verdun, Quebec, Canada
- Party: Liberal
- Spouse: Margaret Cecilia O’Malley (m. 1942)
- Children: 4
- Education: McGill University; Sir George Williams University
- Profession: Manufacturer; merchant; businessman

Bryce Stuart Mackasey PC (August 25, 1921 – September 5, 1999) was a Canadian politician and diplomat. He served as a Member of Parliament, a Member of the National Assembly of Quebec, and as ambassador to Portugal.

== Career ==
Born in Quebec City, Quebec, Mackasey was elected as a Liberal candidate in the riding of Verdun in the 1962 federal election. He was re-elected in the 1963, 1965, 1968, 1972, and 1974 elections. He resigned in 1976 to run in the Quebec provincial election that year, and was elected to the Quebec National Assembly for the riding of Notre-Dame-de-Grâce. He resigned in 1978 to run in a federal by-election in the riding of Ottawa Centre, but was defeated. From 1978 to 1979, he served briefly as President of Air Canada. He was re-elected in the riding of Lincoln in the 1980 election.

Mackasey held numerous ministerial positions including Labour, Manpower and Immigration, Secretary of State, Postmaster General of Canada and Consumer and Corporate Affairs.

== Controversy ==
When Mackasey left office in 1984 Prime Minister John Turner appointed him Ambassador to Portugal; this led to Conservative leader Brian Mulroney's famous comment about patronage, "There's no whore like an old whore". Mulroney canceled the appointment shortly after he was elected and appointed former Speaker of the House Lloyd Francis in Mackasey's place.

== Awards ==
In 1970, Mackasey received an honorary doctorate from Sir George Williams University, which later became Concordia University.
