= John Munro (Canadian politician) =

Canadian politician

The Honourable John Munro PC
- Official 1980 portrait

Minister of Indian Affairs and Northern Development
- In office 3 March 1980 – 29 June 1984
- Prime Minister: Pierre Trudeau
- Preceded by: Jake Epp
- Succeeded by: Doug Frith

Minister of Labour
- In office 27 November 1972 – 8 September 1978
- Prime Minister: Pierre Trudeau
- Preceded by: Martin O'Connell
- Succeeded by: André Ouellet (Acting)

Minister of National Health and Welfare
- In office 6 July 1968 – 26 November 1972
- Prime Minister: Pierre Trudeau
- Preceded by: Allan MacEachen
- Succeeded by: Marc Lalonde

Minister of Amateur Sport
- In office 6 July 1968 – 26 November 1972
- Prime Minister: Pierre Trudeau
- Preceded by: Allan MacEachen
- Succeeded by: Marc Lalonde

Minister without portfolio
- In office 20 April 1968 – 5 July 1968
- Prime Minister: Pierre Trudeau

Member of Parliament for Hamilton East
- In office 18 June 1962 – 29 June 1984
- Preceded by: Quinto Martini
- Succeeded by: Sheila Copps

Personal details
- Born: John Carr Munro; 16 March 1931 Hamilton, Ontario, Canada
- Died: 19 August 2003 (aged 72) Hamilton, Ontario, Canada
- Party: Liberal
- Occupation: Lawyer

John Carr Munro PC (16 March 1931 – 19 August 2003) was a Canadian politician. He was first elected to the House of Commons of Canada in the 1962 election, and served continuously as a Member of Parliament (MP) for Hamilton, Ontario in the electoral riding of Hamilton East until his resignation in 1984, following his defeat for the leadership of the Liberal Party of Canada which was eventually won by John Turner.

== Career ==
John Carr Munro was born in Hamilton, Ontario on March 16, 1931 to John Anderson Munro (1898-1952) and Katharine Alexandra Carr (1902-1979). He was the grandson of Dr. Leeming George Carr, physician and politician, and Katharine Anderson, author.

After receiving a B.A. from the University of Western Ontario and an LL.B. from Osgoode Hall, Munro entered politics as an alderman for Hamilton, Ontario City Council in 1954. Munro was called to the bar in 1956.

Munro was first elected to the House of Commons in 1962, representing the riding of Hamilton East. From 1963 to 68, Munro served as Parliamentary Secretary to a number of ministers in Lester B. Pearson's government, including the Ministers of Manpower and Immigration, Trade and Commerce, and National Health and Welfare.

Munro was appointed to Cabinet by Prime Minister Pierre Trudeau, and served variously as Minister of Amateur Sport, Minister of Health and Welfare and Minister of Labour from 1968 to 1978. Munro worked closely with Lou Lefaive as the director of the Directorate of Fitness and Amateur Sport to develop the government's policies on sport.

He returned to cabinet when Trudeau returned to power in the 1980 federal election and served as Minister of Indian Affairs and Northern Development throughout Trudeau's final term.

On June 21, 1981, the Toronto Sun ran a front-page story accusing Munro of profiting from illegal insider trading through his advance knowledge of Petro-Canada's bid to acquire Petrofina Canada. Munro sued the paper, its editors, and the two reporters for libel. There no evidence that the stock transaction described in the Sun had ever taken place, and the corporation through which the deals were said to have been made never actually existed. Even with the Sun's retraction and apology, the paper was ordered to pay Munro $75,000, then a very high award for a libel case in Canada.

On June 27, 1978, Munro married future David Peterson Cabinet Minister Lilly Oddie, who took his surname. The couple would later divorce after his career, when Oddie returned to using her original name.

Munro ran at the 1984 Liberal leadership convention coming in sixth. Munro attempted to return to Parliament in the 1988 general election in the riding of Lincoln but was defeated by Progressive Conservative Shirley Martin. He again attempted to win the Liberal nomination in the riding of Lincoln in the 1993 general election, but the nomination eventually went to Tony Valeri after an acrimonious fight between Munro and the Liberal Party national office.

His leadership campaign led to trouble when Munro and his associates were investigated under the Criminal Code and faced 37 charges alleging illegal kickbacks to his 1984 leadership campaign and other irregularities. The charges were thrown out in 1991. He sued the federal government in 1992 for compensation over being wrongfully charged. The case dragged on for seven years until the government agreed to an out-of-court settlement of $1.4 million, of which $1.2 million went to Munro's lawyers and other creditors.

In 2000, he ran for Mayor of Hamilton, finishing in fourth place with nearly 10 percent of the popular vote.

He died on August 19, 2003.

== Legacy ==
Munro was the Minister of Indian and Northern Affairs who, in November 1982, announced the federal government's conditional approval of the creation of the Nunavut territory, setting off the official chain of events that culminated in the division of the Northwest Territories and the establishment of the new Arctic territory in 1999.

Hamilton's John C. Munro International Airport is named after him.

Following Munro's death, Prime Minister Jean Chrétien said he was "a very good man. He was a very good Member of Parliament and he was a very good minister and a guy who worked very, very hard (on) all the files that (were) given to him. He was a...grassroots politician, very socially oriented and a very effective minister."

1988 Canadian federal election: Lincoln
Party	Candidate	Votes
Progressive Conservative	Shirley Martin	19,955
Liberal	John Munro	19,517
New Democratic	John Mayer	9,037
Christian Heritage	Peggy Humby	2,742
Independent	Albert Papazian	280
Independent	David Olchowecki	76
Independent	Ann Stasiuk	67
Independent	André Vachon	28
