= William Gibson (Lincoln, Ontario politician) =

Canadian politician

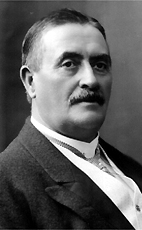
The Hon. William Gibson

William Gibson (August 7, 1849 – May 4, 1914) was a Canadian politician. From 1891 to 1900, he served as a Liberal Member of Parliament in the House of Commons of Canada representing the riding of Lincoln and Niagara.

Born in Peterhead, Scotland, the son of William Gibson and Lucretia Gilzean, he was educated in Scotland and emigrated to Canada in 1870. Gibson was a contractor and engineer involved in the construction of the St. Clair Tunnel, the Welland Canal, the Victoria Bridge and several bridges on the Grand Trunk Railway. He operated a limestone quarry near Beamsville, Ontario and was also president of the Bank of Hamilton, the Hamilton Gaslight Company and the Keewatin Power Company. On 11 February 1902, he was appointed to the Senate of Canada, a position which he held until his death in Beamsville at the age of 64.
