= Zanbaqi =

Zanbaqi الزنبقي
- Village
- Location in Syria
- Coordinates: 36°0′34″N 36°22′35″E
- Country: Syria
- Governorate: Idlib
- District: Jisr al-Shughur District
- Subdistrict: Darkush Nahiyah

Population (2004)
  - Total: 752
- Time zone: UTC+2 (EET)
  - Summer (DST): UTC+3 (EEST)
- City Qrya Pcode: C4253

Zanbaqi (Arabic: الزنبقي) is a Syrian village located in Darkush Nahiyah in Jisr al-Shughur District, Idlib. According to the Syria Central Bureau of Statistics (CBS), Zanbaqi had a population of 752 in the 2004 census.

Zanbaqi has become a base for a massive number of Uyghur Turkistan Islamic Party militants and their families in Syria, estimated at 3,500; military camps in the area are training hundreds of children from these families, Hezbollah media, Iranian media, and Syrian government media accused Turkish intelligence of being involved in transporting these Uyghurs via Turkey to Syria, to use them first in Syria to help Jabhat Al-Nusra and gain combat experience fighting against the Syrian Army before sending them back to Xinjiang to fight against China if they manage to survive.
