= George Rykert =

Canadian politician

George Rykert (August 8, 1797 – November 1, 1857) was a businessman, surveyor and political figure in Upper Canada.

He was born in Rhinebeck, New York, in 1797 and came to the Niagara District with his family around 1810. He served with the local militia during the War of 1812. After the war, he settled at St. Catharines and taught school there. He trained as a surveyor and became a deputy land surveyor for the province in 1821. He undertook a number of projects, including laying out a plan for the expanding community at St. Catharines and helping prepare estimates for a canal system on the Saint Lawrence River. He was involved in an unsuccessful contract to complete a section of the Rideau Canal near the current site of Smiths Falls in 1827. In 1829, he opened a general store and wharf at St. Catherines with his brother-in-law; he also became involved in a distillery and a gristmill. He became a justice of the peace in the Niagara District in 1832. In 1834, he was elected to the Legislative Assembly of Upper Canada in the 2nd riding of Lincoln; he was reelected in 1836.

Rykert supported the sale of the clergy reserves with the funds raised going to fund public works and schools as well as the needs of all religious groups represented in the province. He opposed the union of Upper and Lower Canada and responsible government as described in Lord Durham's report. He was defeated by William Hamilton Merritt, a former political ally, in a bid for a seat in the legislative assembly for the united province. In 1843, he became the agent in St. Catharines for the Commercial Bank of the Midland District. In 1845, he became a member of the police board for the town; he was elected to the town council in 1855 and served as reeve from 1856 to 1857. He also served as agent for a number of companies in the region and was president of the Port Dalhousie and Thorold Railway.

He died in St Catharines in 1857 of a chest cancer.

His son John Charles later became a member of the House of Commons of Canada.
