= John Charles Rykert =

Canadian politician

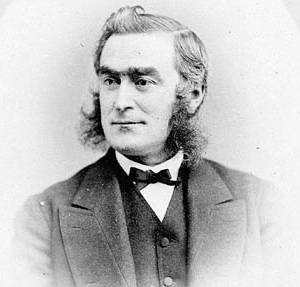
John Charles Rykert

John Charles Rykert (10 March 1832 – 28 December 1913) was a lawyer and Conservative member of the House of Commons of Canada. He represented Lincoln from 1878 to 1882 and Lincoln and Niagara from 1882 to 1891. He represented Lincoln in the Legislative Assembly of Ontario from 1867 to 1878.

He was born in St. Catharines in 1832, the son of George Rykert and Ann Maria Mittleberger. He studied at Upper Canada College and the University of Toronto. He went on to article in law, was called to the bar in 1854 and opened a practice in St. Catharines. In 1854, he married Annie Hawley. He served as reeve of Grantham Township from 1857 to 1864, reeve of St. Catharines from 1864 to 1876 and mayor from 1895 to 1896. He represented Lincoln in the Legislative Assembly of the Province of Canada from 1860 to 1863; he was defeated when he ran for reelection in 1863. Rykert died in St. Catharines at the age of 81.

One of his sons, also named John Charles, became the first customs collector in the Kootenay region of British Columbia. Another son, Arthur Frederick, also served in the Ontario assembly.

== Electoral history ==
1867 Ontario general election: Lincoln
Party	Candidate	Votes
Conservative	John Charles Rykert	Acclaimed
Source: Elections Ontario

1871 Ontario general election: Lincoln
Party	Candidate	Votes
Conservative	John Charles Rykert	Acclaimed
Source: Elections Ontario
