= Shirley Martin =

Canadian politician (1932–2021)

Official 1988 portrait

Shirley Martin PC (November 20, 1932 in Hamilton, Ontario – September 16, 2021) was a Canadian politician.

Martin was a businesswoman and was first elected to the House of Commons of Canada in the 1984 federal election as the Progressive Conservative Member of Parliament for Lincoln, Ontario.

In 1987, she became Parliamentary Secretary to the Minister of Public Works. After the 1988 federal election, she joined Prime Minister Brian Mulroney's Cabinet as Minister of State for Transport. She served briefly as Minister of State for Indian Affairs and Northern Development (1990–1991) before returning to the Transport portfolio.

She retired from Cabinet in 1993 when Mulroney was succeeded as PC leader and prime minister by Kim Campbell, and was not a candidate in the 1993 federal election.

1984 Canadian federal election: Lincoln
Party	Candidate	Votes
Progressive Conservative	Shirley Martin	26,318
Liberal	Joseph Macaluso	14,646
New Democratic	John Mayer	11,888
Green	Robert A. Keddy	345
Independent	Larry E. Johnston	171
Independent	Ann Stasiuk	121
Social Credit	A. J. Sid Hamelin	120

1988 Canadian federal election: Lincoln
Party	Candidate	Votes
Progressive Conservative	Shirley Martin	19,955
Liberal	John Munro	19,517
New Democratic	John Mayer	9,037
Christian Heritage	Peggy Humby	2,742
Independent	Albert Papazian	280
Independent	David Olchowecki	76
Independent	Ann Stasiuk	67
Independent	André Vachon	28
