= Kurucs (disambiguation) =

Kurucs were Hungarian anti-Habsburg insurgents.

Kurucs may also refer to:

- Artūrs Kurucs, Latvian basketball player
- Rodions Kurucs, Latvian basketball player

== See also ==
- Ned Kuruc, Canadian politician
