= Chad Collins =

Chad Collins may refer to:

- Chad Collins (golfer) (born 1978), American golfer
- Chad Michael Collins (born 1979), American actor
- Chad Collins (politician), Canadian politician
- Chadd Collins (born 1995), Australian Muay Thai fighter
