= Orchard Park Secondary School =

Location
- 200 DeWitt Road, Stoney Creek, Ontario; 43.21753°N 79.71149°W

Information
- Superintendent: Paul Denomme
- Area trustee: Todd White
- Principal: Kristen Armstrong
- Colours: Indigo and red

Orchard Park Secondary School is located at 200 DeWitt Road, Stoney Creek, Ontario and has a 2009–10 enrolment of 1220. The school opened in 1966 and is a member of the Hamilton-Wentworth District School Board. Orchard Park Secondary School uses the Ontario Secondary School Literacy Test (OSSLT) to assess Grade 10 students' skills in reading and writing. Successful completion of the test is one of 32 requirements students need to attain in order to receive an Ontario Secondary School Diploma. The school also has a special education program and offers co-operative education.

== Program specialization ==
Orchard Park Secondary School offers specialized programs for students with certain areas of interest. Specialized courses include: Hospitality & Tourism, Robotics, Basketball Academy, Football Academy and Cosmetology & Fashion. Specialized programs are intended to help students gain access to post secondary education in a specific field or have tools to join the workforce. For students entering post-secondary education or entering the workforce alike, the school offers a Specialist High Skills Major in Hospitality and Tourism. Through this program, students also obtain their SmartServe Certification, First-Aid Certification, Customer Service Certification, Food Safety Certification, and WHMIS Certification over the 11th and 12th grade Hospitality and Tourism courses.

== Notable alumni ==
- Corey Grant - CFL Player/Coach
- Bob Krouse - CFL Player for Hamilton Tiger Cats
- Donnie Ruiz - CFL player
- Ned Kuruc - Member of the Canadian House of Commons
- M. Rivers/Kazzer - musician, lead vocalist of Redlight King

== See also ==
- Education in Ontario
- List of secondary schools in Ontario
