= Donnie Ruiz =

Canadian football player (born 1978)

Profile
- Position: Safety

Personal information
- Born: July 5, 1978 (age 48); Montreal, Quebec

Career information
- High school: Orchard Park Secondary School
- University: Wilfrid Laurier University

Career history
- 2001: Winnipeg Blue Bombers
- 2002–2005: Ottawa Renegades
- 2006: Saskatchewan Roughriders
- Stats at CFL.ca

Donald Ruiz (born July 5, 1978) is a retired Canadian Football League player who played for the Winnipeg Blue Bombers, Ottawa Renegades, and Saskatchewan Roughriders from 2001 to 2006 as a free safety.

Ruiz was born in Montreal, Quebec, and grew up in Stoney Creek, Ontario (now Hamilton, Ontario), where he attended Orchard Park Secondary School. He attended university at Wilfrid Laurier University where he played as a defensive halfback for the Golden Hawks and was named the 1999 Ontario University Athletics defensive player of the year.

Ruiz was signed as an undrafted free agent out of university by the Winnipeg Blue Bombers in 2000 and was expected to make the team until he broke his clavicle in a pre-season game. He returned to play another season for the Golden Hawks and made his CFL debut in 2001.

He was selected by the now-defunct Ottawa Renegades in the first round of their expansion draft in 2002. After the Renegades had their operations suspended by the league, the Saskatchewan Roughriders selected him 27th overall in the Ottawa Renegades dispersal draft. He was released by the Roughriders on June 24, 2007, at the end of training camp.
