= Stoney Creek, Ontario =

Community in Hamilton, Ontario

Stoney Creek
- Community (Dissolved city)
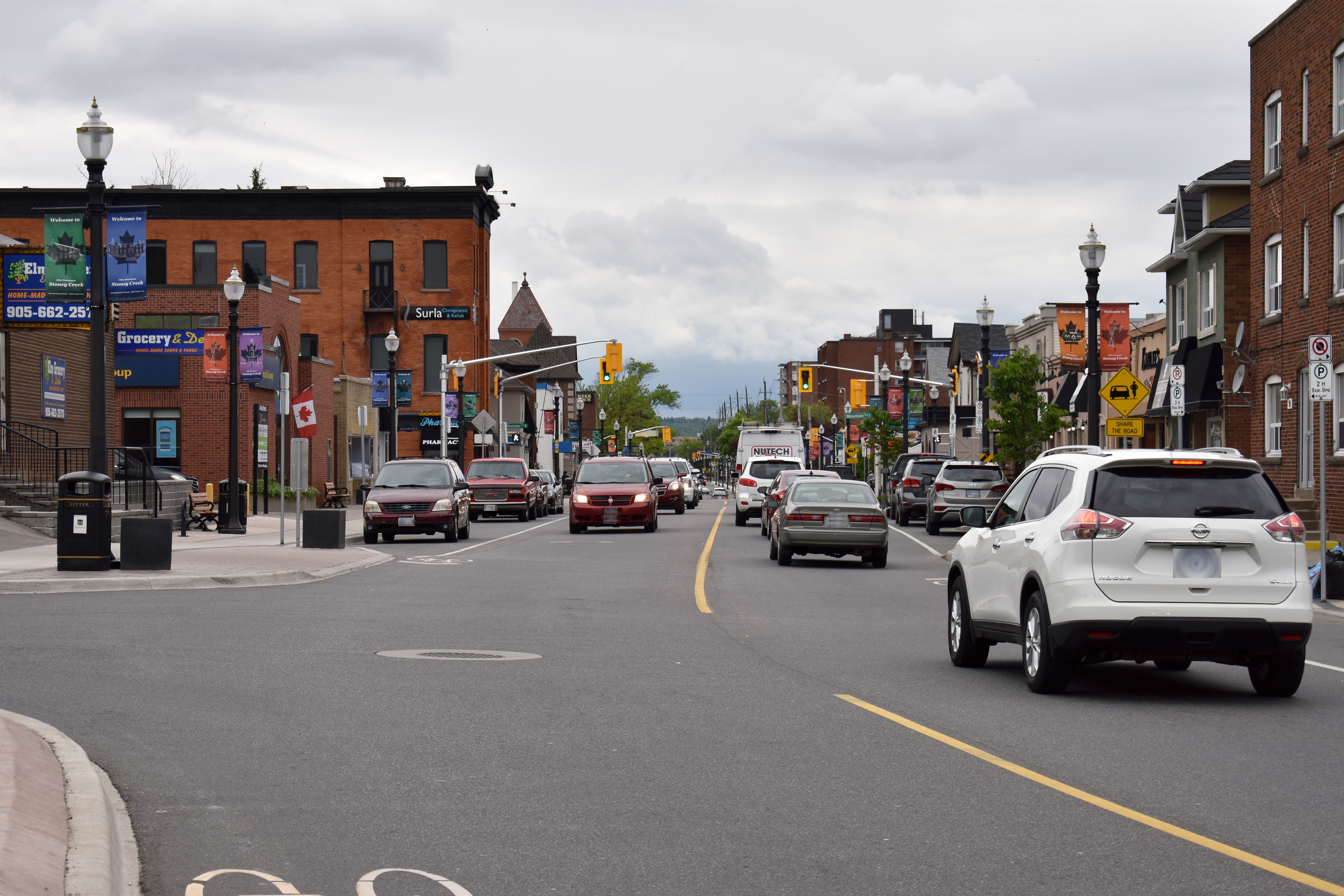
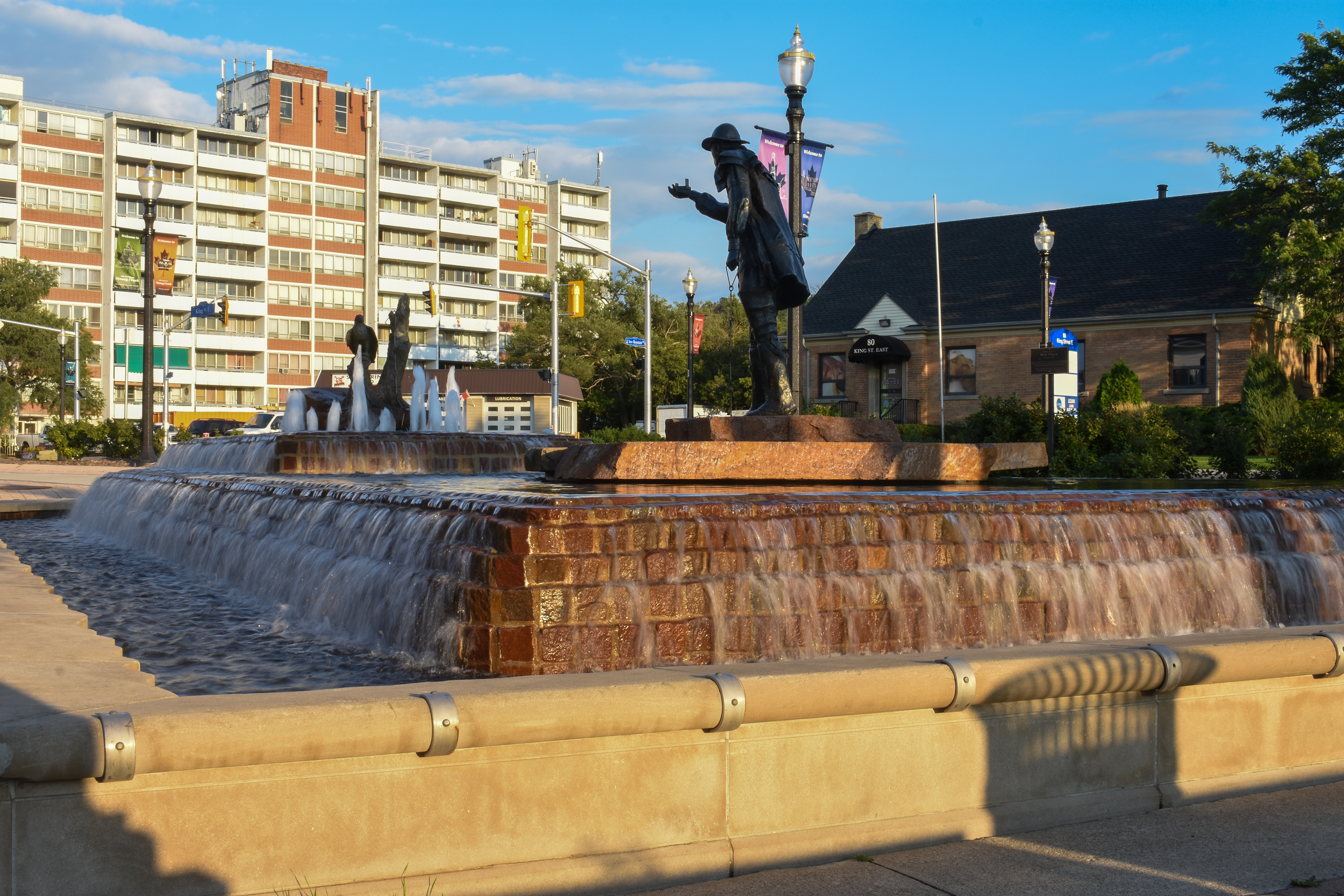
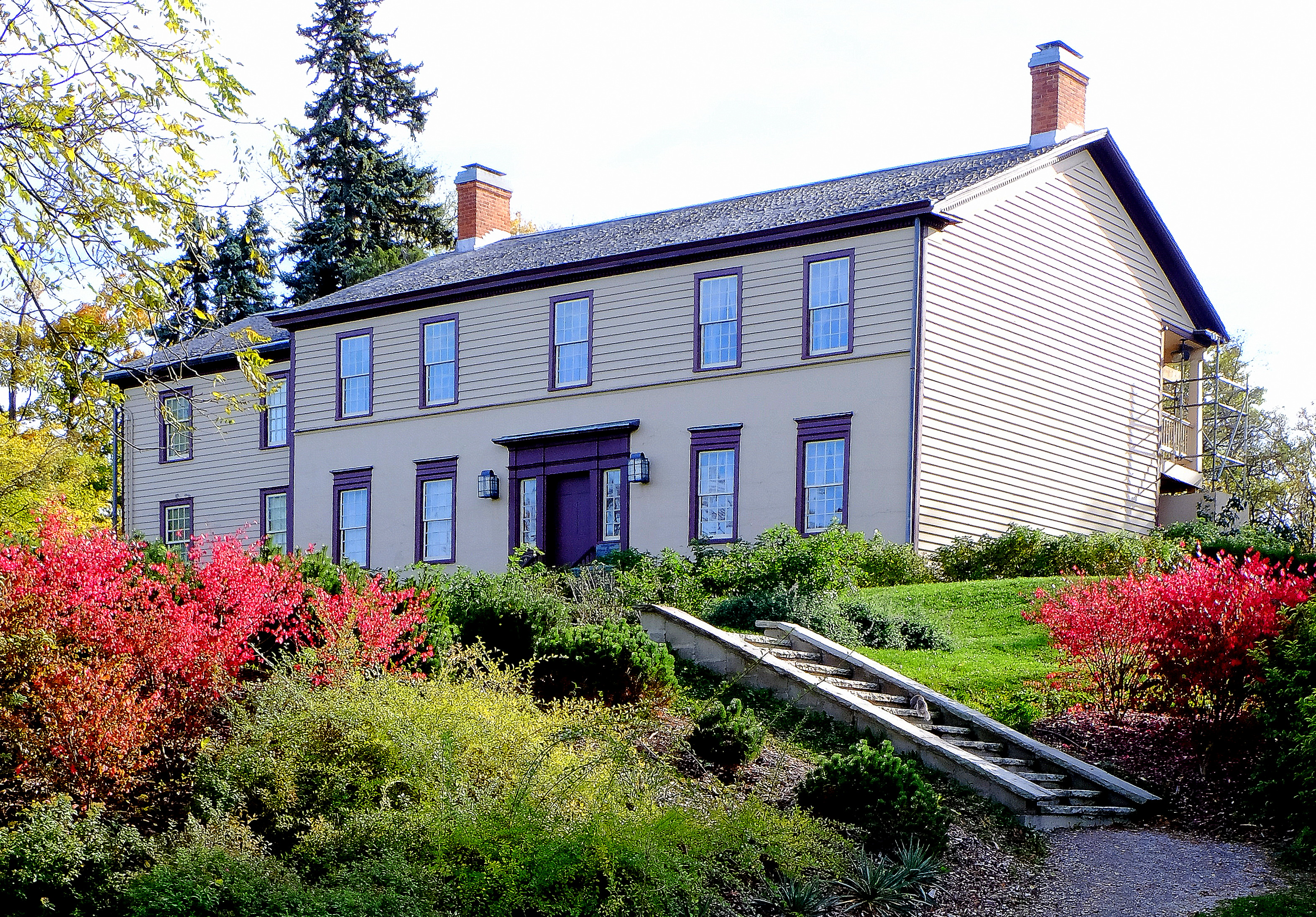
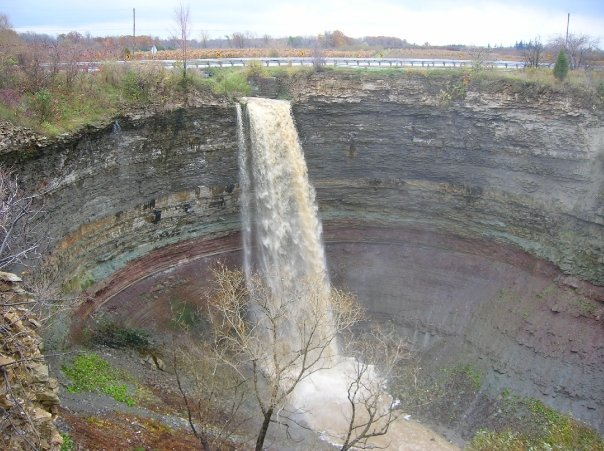
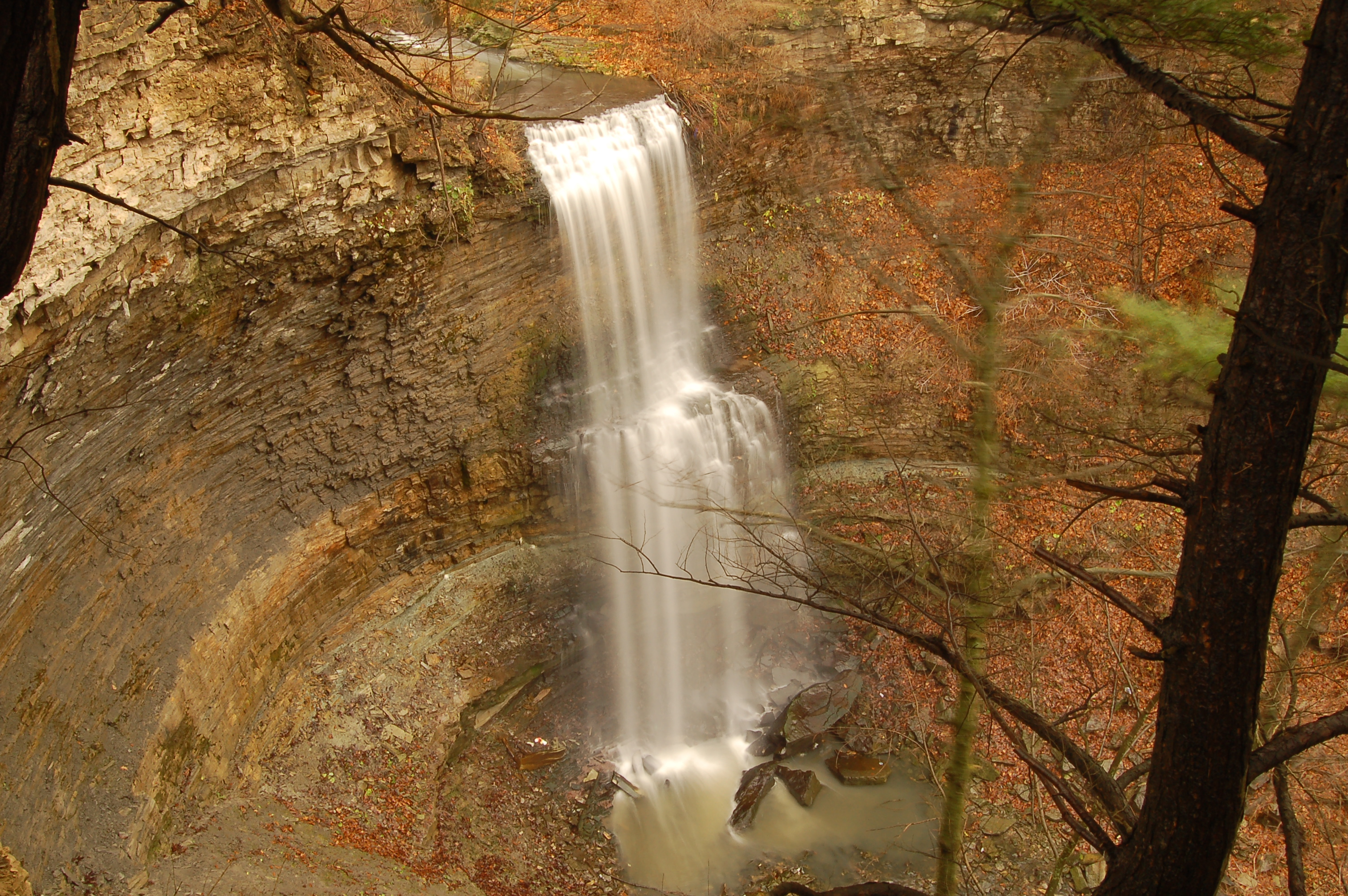
- Downtown Stoney Creek Augustus Jones Fountain Battlefield House Devil's Punchbowl Felker's Falls

- Location within City of Hamilton
- Coordinates: 43°12′59″N 79°45′18″W
- Country: Canada
- Province: Ontario
- City: Hamilton
- Established: 1800s (village)
- Incorporated: 1974; 52 years ago (town)
- Incorporated: 1984; 42 years ago (city)
- Amalgamated: January 1, 2001; 25 years ago

Government
  - MP: Ned Kuruc (CPC), Dan Muys (CPC)
  - MPP: Neil Lumsden (PC), Donna Skelly (PC)

Area
  - Total: 100.25 km^{2} (38.71 sq mi)

Population (2021)
  - Total: 76,382
  - Density: 693/km^{2} (1,790/sq mi)
- Time zone: UTC−05:00 (EST)
  - Summer (DST): UTC−04:00 (EDT)
- Forward sortation area: L8E, L8G, L8J
- Area codes: 905 and 289

Stoney Creek is a community in the city of Hamilton in the Canadian province of Ontario located 10 km east of Downtown Hamilton and 57 km south-west of Toronto. It was a municipality until 2001, when it was amalgamated with Hamilton, Dundas, Ancaster, Flamborough and Glanbrook to form the City of Hamilton.

The community of Stoney Creek is located on the south shore of western Lake Ontario, east of downtown Hamilton, into which feed the watercourses of Stoney Creek as well as several other minor streams. The historic area, known as the "Old Town", is below the Niagara Escarpment.

Stoney Creek experienced an increase in residential growth, particularly in the lower city in the 1970s and 1980s, and in the west mountain in the 1990s and 2000s, but most of the land mass of Stoney Creek remains agricultural. The communities of Elfrida, Fruitland, Tapleytown, Tweedside, Vinemount, and Winona serve as distinct reminders of the agricultural legacy of Stoney Creek and Saltfleet Township.

== History ==
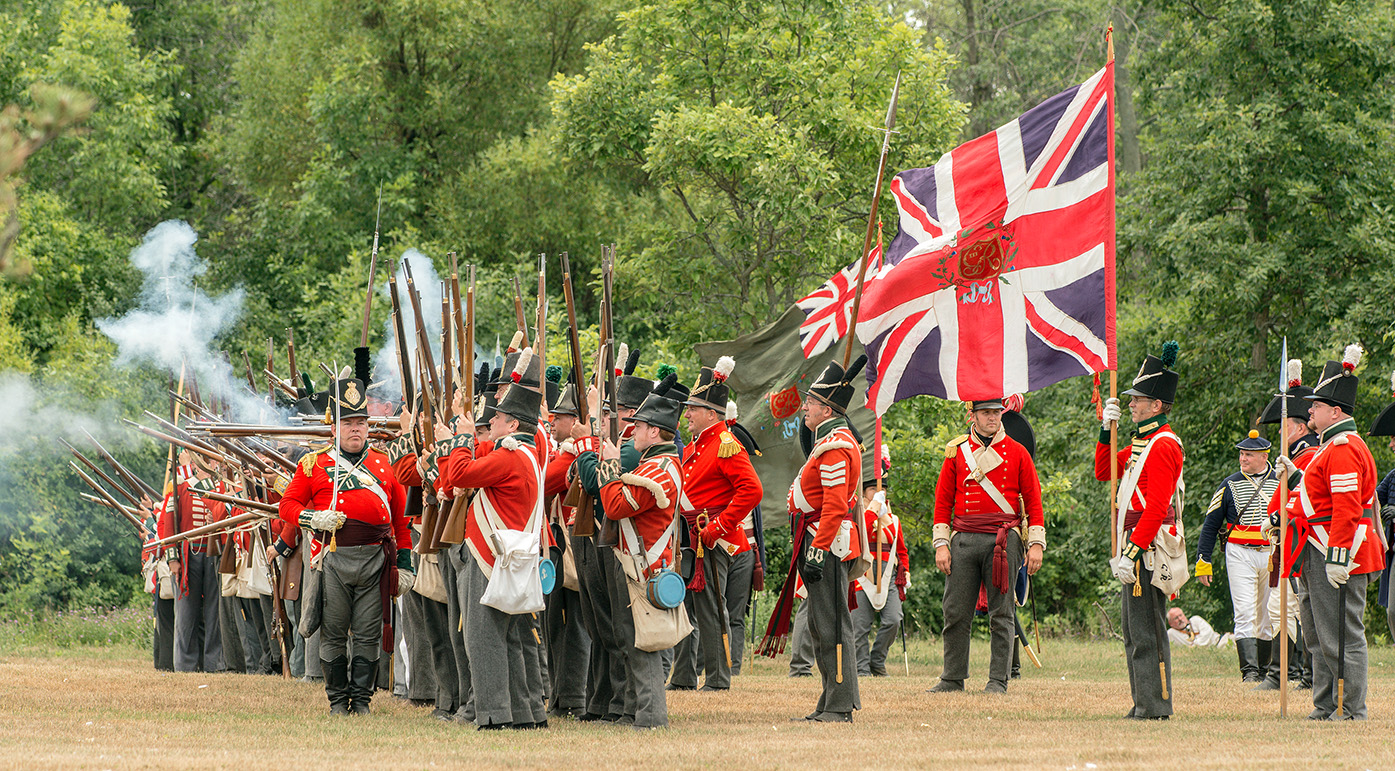
War of 1812 re-enactment, Stoney Creek, Ontario, an annual event (June) at Battlefield House.

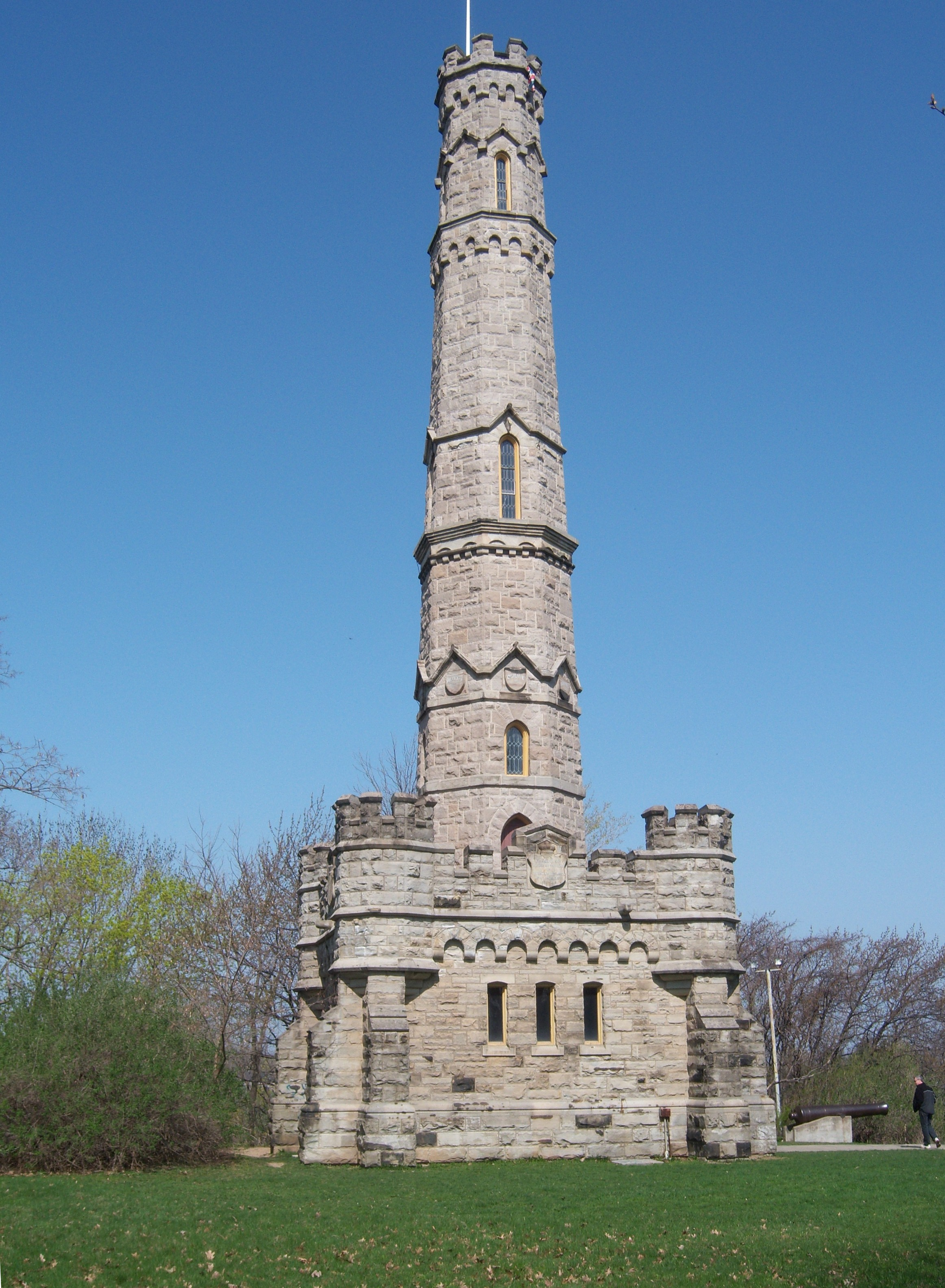
Battle of Stoney Creek Monument

Stoney Creek was explored by French-Canadian fur traders before the area was settled by Loyalists fleeing the American Revolution in the late 1700s. The name 'Stoney Creek' is derived from the area's central watercourse, Stoney Creek, which runs from the Devil's Punchbowl, in the Niagara Escarpment, to Lake Ontario. It is often taken for granted the 'Stoney Creek' is a description of the creek's rockiness although some evidence suggests the name comes from an early settler Edmund Stoney. Others say that it refers to a type of 'Stoney' flour that was produced by the stone mills in the area at the time.

On June 6, 1813, the settlement garnered some notability during the War of 1812 as the site of the eponymous battle. After being informed of American troop movements by Billy Green, a local hero and the namesake of Billy Green elementary school, British forces overwhelmed the Americans in a surprise night attack.

The Village of Stoney Creek became part of Saltfleet Township upon the latter's establishment in 1791, and was later designated a town in 1974, as part of the Regional Municipality of Hamilton–Wentworth. In 1984 it obtained city status, and on January 1, 2001, it was amalgamated into the City of Hamilton.

== Demographics ==
According to the 2001 census, the population of Stoney Creek was 59,327 up 5.5 per cent from the 1996 census. Children under 14 years of age totaled 19.4% while those in retirement age constituted 12.6% of the total population. Some 25.94% or a quarter of the population was foreign born. The census showed that Stoney Creek was 92.72% white (European), of which 55% had British or Irish origins, 16% Italian, 21% Slavic (Croatian, Polish, Serbian, Ukrainian etc.); 3.0% South Asian; 1.0% Black; 1.0% mixed race; and 0.6% Chinese. As of the 2006 census, Stoney Creek's population had risen to 62,292. As of the 2021 census, Stoney Creek's population had risen to 112,028. The median age of the population was 43.2.

== Economy ==
The temperate environment on the Niagara Peninsula's western end made the Stoney Creek area in eastern Wentworth County to be known for fruit growing. In recent decades, as the quality and reputation of Ontario wines grew, Stoney Creek became part of the fringes of the Niagara winery region.

Agriculture continued to be the major employer for decades, only supplanted by others as community growth brought it into closer contact with Hamilton and the great conurbation of the Golden Horseshoe. Stoney Creek became a centre for light industry, road transportation, and commuting residences since its land costs were much lower than in neighbouring Hamilton.

Fiesta Mall is a power centre type mall with Fortinos as the main anchor tenant. The mall had been a drive-in theatre that closed in 1975.

== Attractions ==
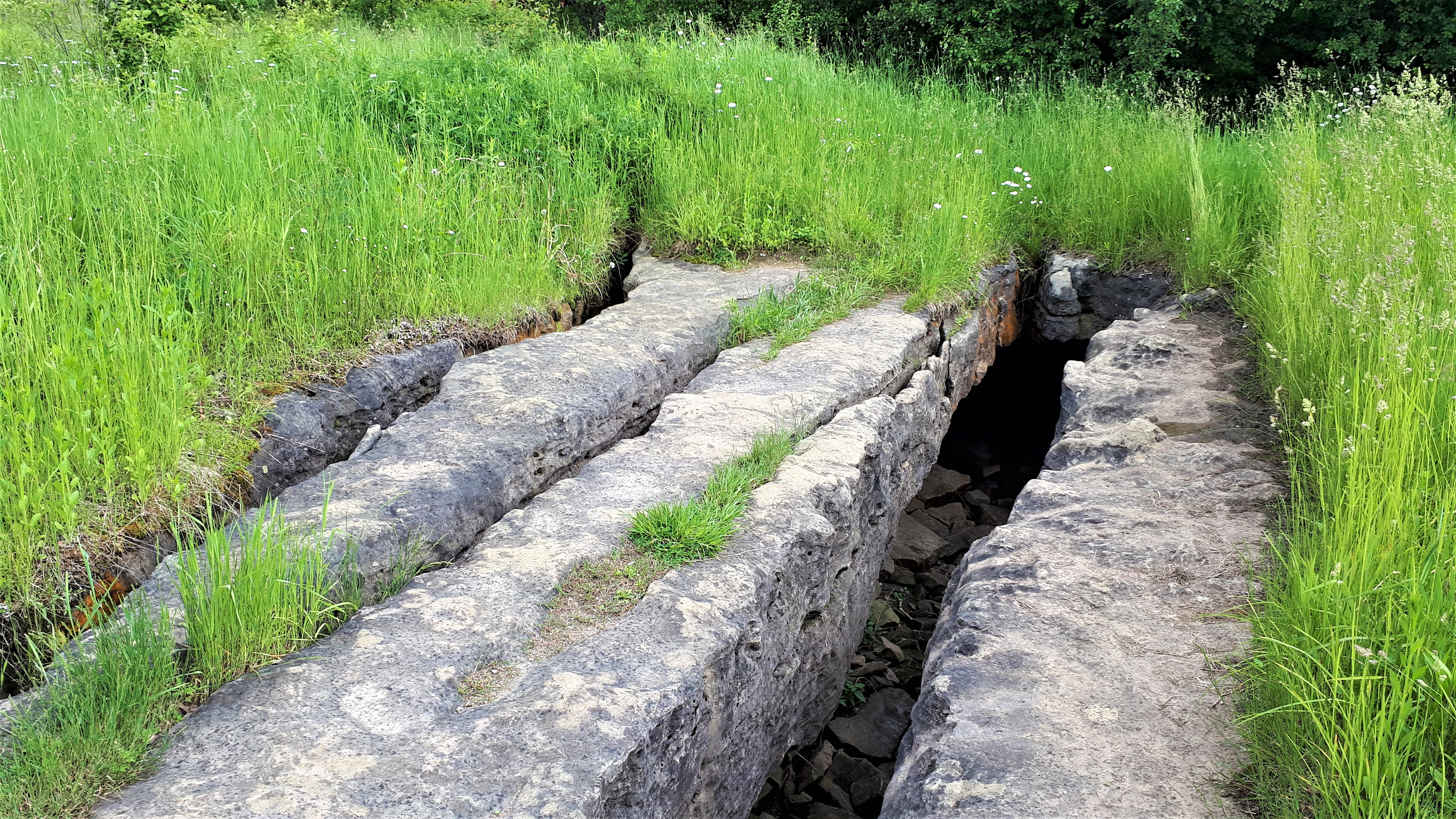
Eramosa Karst Conservation Area

In addition to the Stoney Creek, and Battlefield House, the Erland Lee Museum, site of the first Women's Institute in the World, is also in Stoney Creek.

Branches of the Bruce Trail provide access to Battlefield Park as well as the Devil's Punchbowl. The latter is marked by a large illuminated cross and offers an excellent lookout for both Stoney Creek and Hamilton. Other notable green spaces include Fifty Point Conservation Area, which includes camping and a small craft harbour. Both the Devil's Punchbowl and the large cross mentioned above were featured in the 2006 horror film Silent Hill and can be seen during the first few scenes. Another movie filmed in the area was the 1998 film The Big Hit, starring Mark Wahlberg.

On a more commercial note, the Winona Peach Festival serves up homegrown fruit, crafts and music. Like the peach festival, the Stoney Creek Flag Festival is also held every summer. Eastgate Square Mall straddles the former border between Hamilton and Stoney Creek.

In 1965, the Stoney Creek Little League team became the first (and as of 2018, only) Canadian team to play in the World Championship Game. (It lost to Windsor Locks, Connecticut, 3–1.)

== Government ==
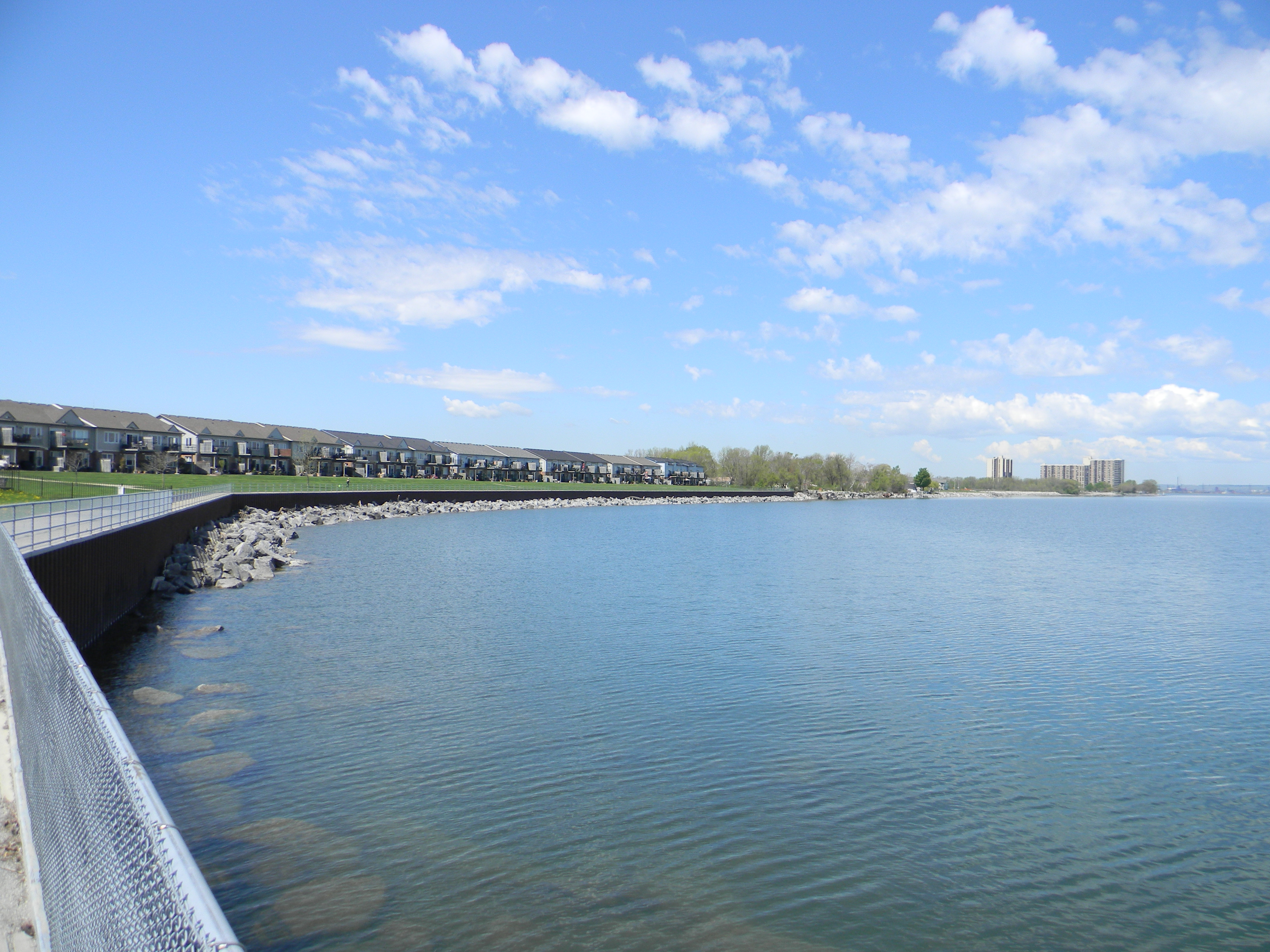
Stoney Creek, Waterfront

Local jam merchant E. D. Smith promoted the area and served as a Wentworth MP around the turn of the 20th century. Otherwise, the most recent political tremor occurred when Tony Valeri, the federal minister of transport who supported Paul Martin as Liberal leader, defeated Sheila Copps, a former Canadian heritage minister who supported Jean Chrétien, in a bitter constituency nomination election after redistricting forced the two sitting MPs head-to-head in the formerly divided Hamilton East-Stoney Creek.

From 2006 until 2014, Hamilton East-Stoney Creek was represented at the federal level by the New Democratic Party MP Wayne Marston, who was defeated in 2015 by former Mayor and Liberal Party candidate Bob Bratina. Bratina opted not to seek re-election in 2021 due to his opposition to the federal government's decision to fund Hamilton's light rail transit project. In 2021, former City Councillor Chad Collins was elected as Member of Parliament for the area as the Liberal Party candidate. Collins was narrowly defeated in 2025 by local entrepreneur Conservative Ned Kuruc, who had worked as a mortgage specialist and owner of a local cannabis brand prior to his election. Kuruc is the first Conservative to represent Hamilton East-Stoney Creek at the federal level.

Provincially, the area has been represented by Progressive Conservative Neil Lumsden since 2022.

Like its bigger neighbour, Stoney Creek expanded over the 20th century to encompass more and more of its smaller neighbours like Fruitland, Winona, Vinemount, Tapleytown, Tweedside and Elfrida in Saltfleet Township. The Village of Stoney Creek consolidated with Saltfleet Township in 1974 to become the Town of Stoney Creek. Areas it annexed on top of the Niagara Escarpment west of Highway 20 (now known as Upper Centennial Parkway) became known as Upper Stoney Creek or Satellite City.

In 1984, it was granted city status, and was looking to challenge its more populous neighbour. However, over its residents' strenuous objections, the City of Stoney Creek was amalgamated with Glanbrook, Ancaster, Dundas, Flamborough and Hamilton to form the City of Hamilton. However, its suburban voters helped ensure the first mayor of an amalgamated Hamilton came from the former suburbs. The new city's second mayor, Larry Di Ianni, had served as a Stoney Creek Councillor for 20 years.

The last mayor of Stoney Creek was Anne Bain.

== Infrastructure ==
Stoney Creek is served by the Queen Elizabeth Way, various current or former Ontario provincial highways and a largely irregular network of residential streets. Portions of Upper Stoney Creek are laid out in a grid pattern. It is served by public transit in the form of the Hamilton Street Railway, or HSR, which has been operated in Stoney Creek by the regional government since 1974 and the megacity government since 2001.
