= Bob Bratina =

56th mayor of Hamilton

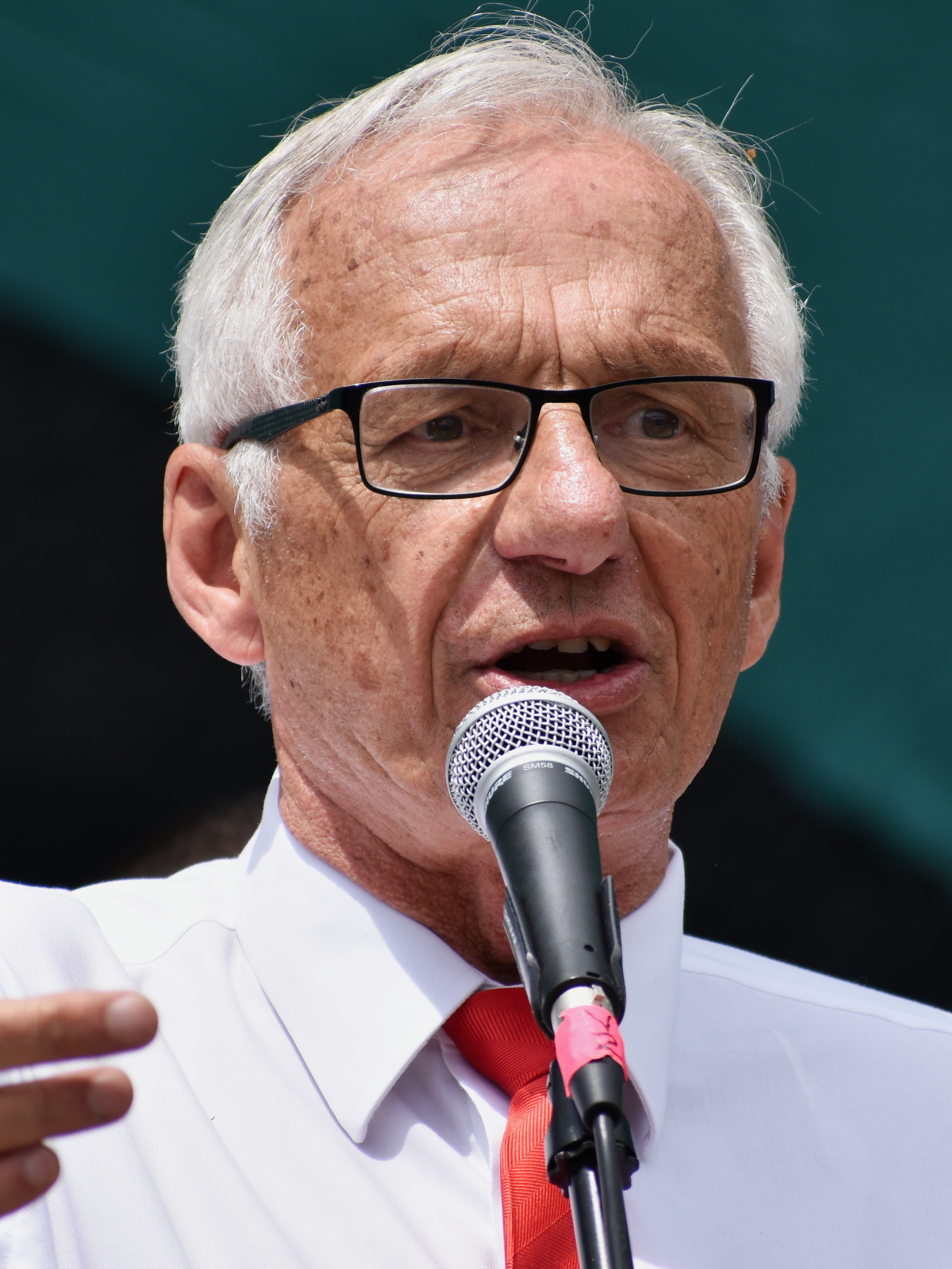
- Bratina in 2017

Member of Parliament for Hamilton East—Stoney Creek
- In office October 19, 2015 – September 20, 2021
- Preceded by: Wayne Marston
- Succeeded by: Chad Collins

56th Mayor of Hamilton
- In office December 1, 2010 – December 3, 2014
- Preceded by: Fred Eisenberger
- Succeeded by: Fred Eisenberger

Hamilton City Councillor
- In office October 5, 2004 – December 1, 2010
- Preceded by: Andrea Horwath
- Succeeded by: Jason Farr
- Constituency: Ward 2

Personal details
- Born: Robert Bratina; 1944 (age 81–82) Hamilton, Ontario, Canada
- Party: Liberal (Until 2022)
- Other political affiliations: Ontario Liberal
- Spouse: Carol Bratina (m. 1966)
- Profession: politician; radio broadcaster

Robert Bratina (born 1944) is a Canadian politician and former broadcaster who was the 56th mayor of Hamilton from 2010 to 2014. Previously, he sat on the Hamilton City Council from 2004 until 2010. He went on to be the Liberal member of Parliament for the riding of Hamilton East—Stoney Creek from 2015 to 2021.

== Early life ==
Bratina was born in 1944 in Hamilton and grew up in the city's East End. Bratina's father immigrated to Hamilton from Zagreb, Croatia at the age of six, and worked for Dofasco. Bratina is of Serbian and Croatian ancestry. He is an alumnus of Delta High School. After graduation, Bratina worked at Dofasco, his father's workplace.

== Radio host ==
Dissatisfied with the nature of his work at Dofasco, Bratina pursued his childhood dream of working in radio broadcasting. Always wanting to work in radio, he found his first broadcasting job at CJCS in Stratford in 1965.

Bratina joined CHML Radio in Hamilton in 1970 after working for CKOC. In 1977, he left for CKKW-FM in Kitchener, Ontario before returning in 1990. Bratina was the morning show co-host with Shiona Thompson on CHML, until September 2010, when he decided to resign his co-host job to run for Mayor of Hamilton.

Bratina was also the play-by-play voice for Hamilton Tiger-Cats. He also filled that role for Toronto Argonauts, combining for a total of 20 seasons, and never missed a broadcast for more than 500 games. He also broadcast McMaster Football and Basketball games, and was commentator on junior hockey broadcasts in Kitchener (CKKW) and Senior A hockey in Guelph (Regals).

In 1998, Bratina was inducted as a member of the Football Reporters of Canada Hall of Fame.

Bratina was a nominee for Hamilton Citizen of the Year, won Hamilton Mountain Citizen of the Year, member of GO Transit Board of Directors, Art Gallery of Hamilton Board of Directors, Theatre Aquarius Board of Directors, and HECFI Board of Directors.

== Municipal politics ==
Bratina was elected in a 2004 by-election called upon the previous councillor, Andrea Horwath's, election as MPP for Hamilton Centre. Bratina campaigned on a platform of citizen participation at City Hall, downtown revitalization and greater integrity at city hall. He was reelected in the 2006 municipal election.

During his time as Ward Two councillor, Bratina sat on the GO Transit Board of Directors. Bratina advocated for transportation changes in Hamilton, such as returning rail passenger service to Hamilton GO Centre and moving idling buses from the downtown Gore Park area to a new transit terminal on MacNab Street.

Due to the age of many of the buildings in Bratina's downtown ward, he became a vocal advocate for updating Hamilton's aging lead-based infrastructure. His concerns over high lead readings in city drinking water resulted in a lead water service replacement loan program and a lead blood screening program for young children

A controversial public figure, Bratina was both rated as one of Hamilton's most trustworthy politicians by readers of View Magazine and publicly criticized for unprofessional conduct, including an incident in which he tossed a pen during a council meeting.

Bratina ran for mayor again in 2022, placing third with 12.27% of the vote. The election was won by Andrea Horwath.

=== Mayor ===
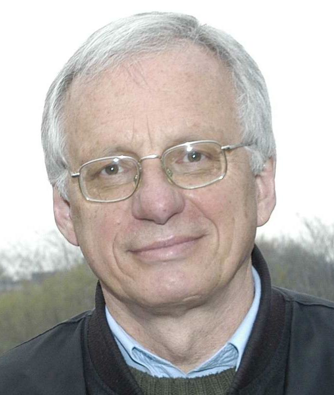
Bratina in 2010

In late summer of 2010, Bratina announced that he would not seek re-election in Ward Two, opting instead to run for mayor against incumbent Fred Eisenberger and former mayor Larry Di Ianni, citing his reasoning as what he believed to be Eisenberger's poor handling of the site-selection process for a proposed stadium to be built in preparation for the 2015 Toronto Pan Am Games. Bratina lead in opinion polls for much of the campaign and, on election night, won 37.32% of the vote and carried 12 of the city's 15 wards to become the city's 57th mayor.

In December 2011 Bratina defended a $30,000 pay increase for his chief of staff, Peggy Chapman, by saying that the raise was the result of a standard re-evaluation of salaries by the city's human resources department. Acting on a complaint, the city's integrity commissioner presented a report to Council on in May 2012 clearing Bratina of three allegations related to bullying city staff and breaking city compensation, finding no evidence of misconduct. On the fourth allegation, the report found that Bratina had broken the Council Code of Conduct when he provided misleading information to the editorial board of The Hamilton Spectator, but said that he had not done so deliberately or out of malice.

In August 2012, Bratina was awarded the Queen Elizabeth II Diamond Jubilee Medal, the second Queen's Jubilee Medal that he was given for his contributions to Hamilton.

As mayor, Bratina spoke out against the city's light rail transit plan, advocating instead for improvements to the Hamilton Street Railway's bus service and increases in GO Transit frequency because he said the city's ridership levels were too low to support light rail – a position which brought him into opposition with some members of the council. Hamilton City Council approved the city's Rapid Ready LRT plan in February 2013, but Bratina but continued to speak out against it. After an interview with The Hamilton Spectator, the paper said that he had incorrectly claimed Premier Kathleen Wynne had told him Hamilton would have to choose between LRT and a Stoney Creek GO Train extension, but Bratina said that he had been misquoted by the paper.

In April 2013, city councillors Jason Farr and Sam Merulla claimed that Bratina had attempted to intimidate Hamilton's City Manager, Chris Murray during a heated debate on light rail. After the city council voted to refer it to the Integrity Commissioner, the subsequent report cleared Bratina, finding that while his actions "not appropriate," they did not violate the Council Code of Conduct because neither Murray nor other city employees present had felt threatened.

Bratina did not run for reelection in the city's 2014 municipal elections, opting instead to seek nomination as a Liberal candidate in the 2015 Canadian federal election. According to CBC News, despite conflicts with council, Bratina's term as mayor saw the completion of a new stadium, development in the downtown core, low tax increases, and a move to solve the impasse in the local Randle Reef project.

In October 2015, a report by the Manning Centre on the dynamics of Hamilton City Council during Bratina's tenure found that the mayor was the only member of the council to have attended every council meeting, and that despite conflict with council, Bratina had always voted with the majority on the council.

== Federal politics ==
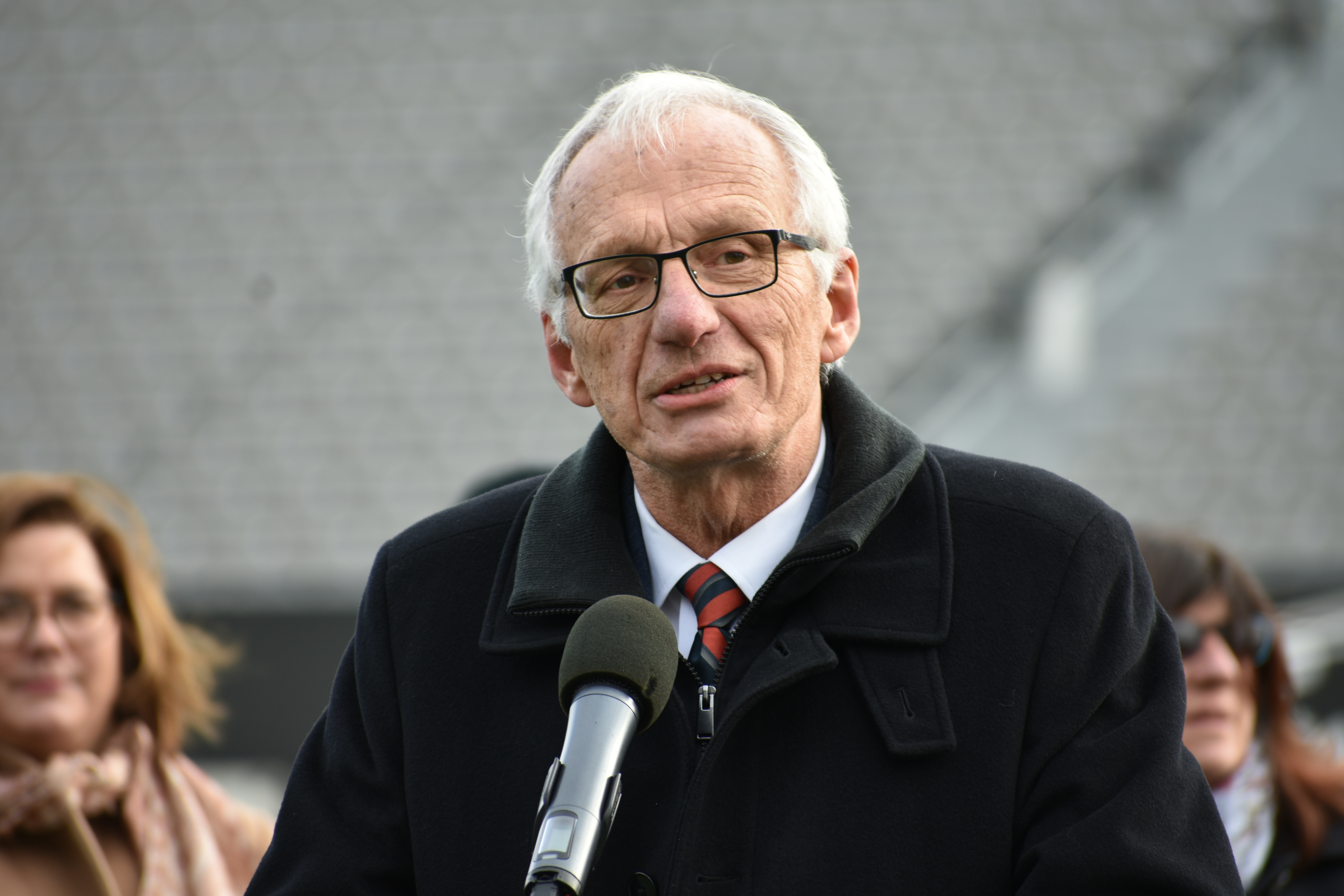
Bratina pictured in January 2019

After opting to not contest Hamilton's mayoralty in 2014, Bratina was rumoured to be seeking the Liberal Party's nomination to run as a candidate in Hamilton Centre. Having previously been approached by the Liberals to challenge Hamilton Centre's New Democrat incumbent David Christopherson in 2009, speculation focused on Bratina's potential candidacy in the inner-city riding. In August, 2014, Bratina announced he was seeking the Liberal nomination in the neighbouring riding of Hamilton East—Stoney Creek, challenging New Democrat incumbent Wayne Marston. Bratina was acclaimed the Liberal candidate for the riding on October 29, 2014.

In campaigning for Parliament, Bratina emphasized a platform of serving as a strong voice on Parliament Hill and continuing his fight for increased transportation funding for the GTHA corridor. Bratina was elected on October 19, 2015, with 38.8% of the vote, defeating Marston, who placed second with 32.7%. The Canadian Press touted Bratina as a potential member of the 29th Canadian Ministry led by Prime Minister Justin Trudeau, because of his experience in Hamilton's municipal government.

In February 2017, a private member's bill introduced by Bratina after the Flint water crisis to create a national strategy to manage lead contamination in drinking water reached the committee stage.

In February 2019, Bratina, while in a meeting with union representatives for local steelworkers, allegedly lost his temper when challenged by union representatives about his promise to advocate for Hamilton area steel workers. The union stated that Bratina shouted "F--k steelworkers" and "F--k those Stelco pensioners" before telling them to get out of his "(expletive) office" then violently slamming the door behind them.

On February 28, 2019 neighbouring MP Scott Duvall claimed Bratina "verbally abused the delegation; attempted to physically intimidate them by striking various pieces of furniture and violently slamming his office door; insulted and disparaged the organization, including the retirees of Stelco Inc., and expelled them from his office". Bratina later said he regrets the "inferences" that came out of a meeting.

In May 2021, Bratina announced that he would not seek re-election in the 2021 Canadian federal election, citing his disagreement with the federal decision to contribute 1.7 billion dollars to the Hamilton LRT as a major reason. In an exit interview, Bratina criticized the project's cost and its lack of connections to the GO Transit transit and also left the door open to a future mayoral run.

He endorsed the Conservative Party of Canada in the 2025 Canadian federal election and left the Liberal party. In the lead-up to the 2025 election, he actively supported Conservative candidate Ned Kuruc in Hamilton East-Stoney Creek, the riding he formerly represented as MP.

== Personal life ==
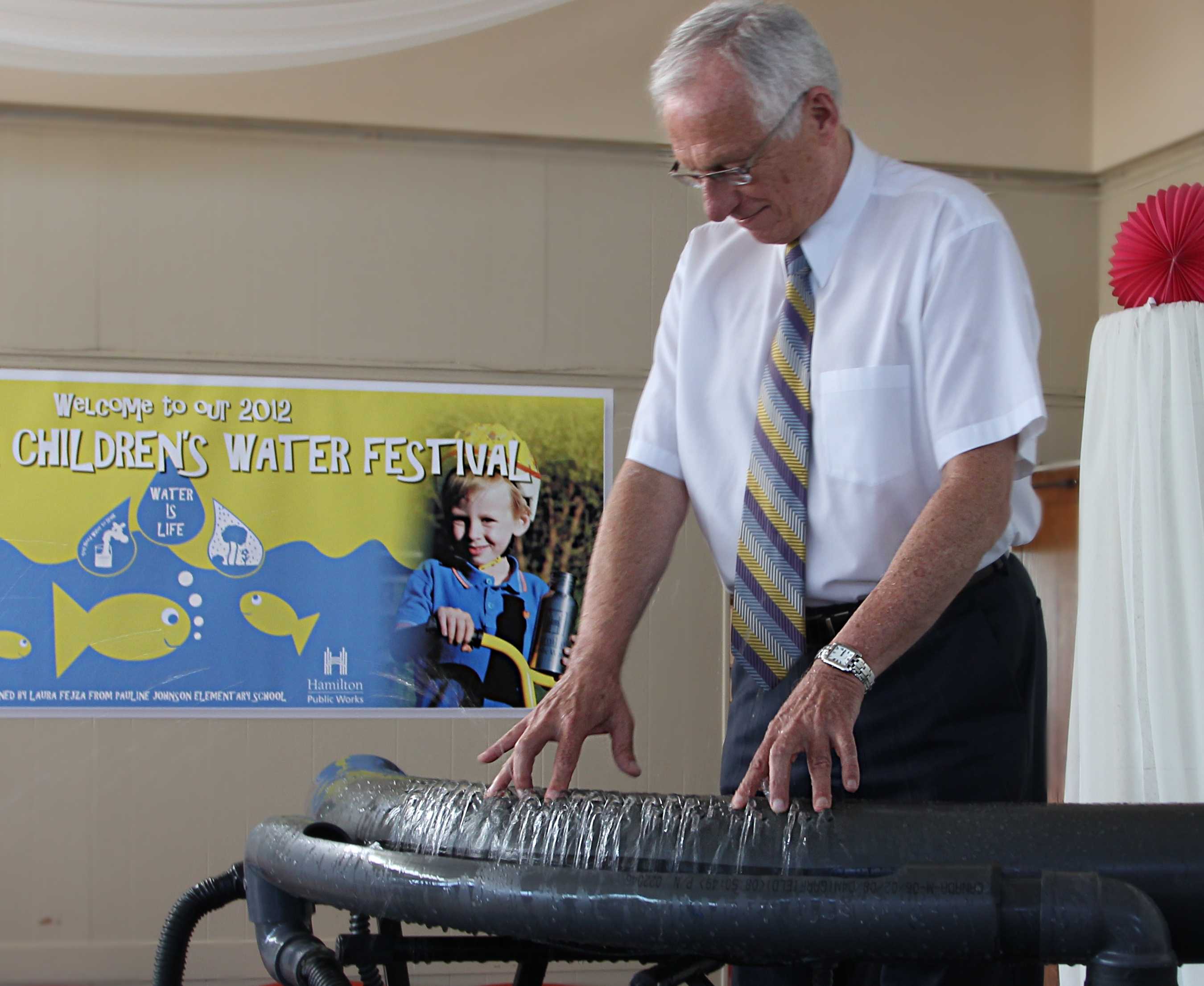
Mayor and musician Bob Bratina playing hydraulophone at the Hamilton Children's Water Festival, May 30, 2012

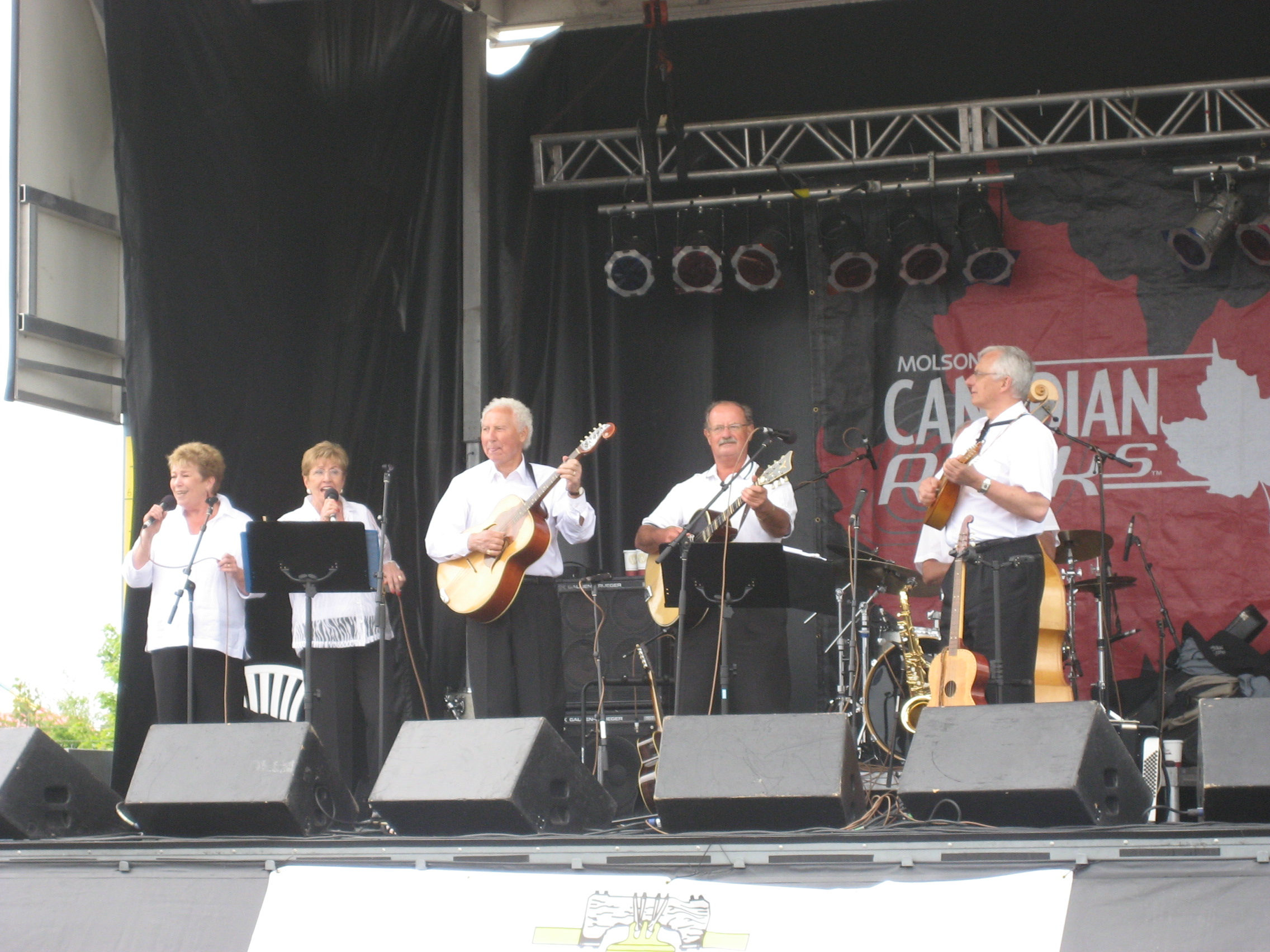
The Balkan Strings featuring Bob Bratina, Hamilton Wingfest 2008

Bratina's wife of fifty years, Carol, sang with his former group the Balkan Strings Tamburitza Orchestra, now disbanded, in which he played the brač, clarinet, saxophone and accordion.

Bratina was an avid marathon runner, finishing 18 marathons, including the Boston Marathon, ten Around the Bay Road Races in Hamilton, and numerous other distances. At 70 years of age, he challenged the 40-year-old mayor of Flint, Michigan, to a mile race at the 2013 Canusa games.

== Electoral record ==
=== Federal ===
2019 Canadian federal election: Hamilton East—Stoney Creek
Party	Candidate	Votes	%	±%	Expenditures
Liberal	Bob Bratina	20,112	38.57	-0.42	$70,837.02
New Democratic	Nick Milanovic	14,930	28.63	-4.08	$64,221.61
Conservative	Nikki Kaur	13,130	25.18	-0.08	$75,555.96
Green	Peter Ormond	2,902	5.57	+2.97	$4,130.84
People's	Charles Crocker	1,072	2.06		none listed
Total valid votes/expense limit		52,146	98.99		
Total rejected ballots		533	1.01	+0.43	
Turnout		52,679	61.79	-0.99	
Eligible voters		85,252			
Liberal hold		Swing		+1.83	
Source: Elections Canada

2015 Canadian federal election
Party	Candidate	Votes	%	±%	Expenditures
Liberal	Bob Bratina	19,622	38.99	+25.41	$64,967.22
New Democratic	Wayne Marston	16,465	32.71	-11.54	$69,194.30
Conservative	Diane Bubanko	12,715	25.26	-11.66	$23,736.31
Green	Erin Davis	1,305	2.59	-0.26	$1,551.87
Communist	Bob Mann	170	0.34		–
Marxist–Leninist	Wendell Fields	55	0.11		–
Total valid votes/Expense limit		50,332	100.00		$215,134.00
Total rejected ballots		293	0.58		
Turnout		50,625	63.25		
Eligible voters		80,042			
Liberal gain from New Democratic		Swing		+18.48	
Source: Elections Canada

=== Municipal ===
Summary of the October 25, 2010 Hamilton, Ontario Mayoral Election
Candidate	Popular vote		
Candidate	Votes	%	±%
Bob Bratina	52,684	37.32%	n/a
Larry Di Ianni	40,091	28.40%	-14.44%
Fred Eisenberger (incumbent)	38,719	27.43%	-15.78%
Michael Baldasaro	2,892	2.05%	-1.56%
Tone Marrone	1,052	0.75%	n/a
Mahesh Butani	950	0.67%	n/a
Glenn Hamilton	949	0.67%	n/a
Pasquale (Pat) Filice	768	0.54%	n/a
Ken Leach	577	0.41%	n/a
Andrew Haines	557	0.39%	n/a
Mark Wozny	433	0.31%	n/a
Steven Waxman	429	0.30%	n/a
Edward Graydon	404	0.29%	n/a
Gino Speziale	356	0.25%	-0.77%
Victor Veri	313	0.22%	n/a
Total votes	141,174	100%	
Registered voters	353,317	40.45%	+3.2%
Note: All Hamilton Municipal Elections are officially non-partisan. Note: Candidate campaign colours are based on the prominent colour used in campaign items (signs, literature, etc.) and are used as a visual differentiation between candidates.
Sources: Hamilton, Ontario, City Clerk's Office

Summary of the November 13, 2006 Hamilton, Ontario Ward Two Councillor Election
Candidate	Popular vote		
Candidate	Votes	%	±%
Bob Bratina (incumbent)	4,001	66.78%	+30.04% Note 1
Judy MacDonald-Musitano	1,424	23.77%	+17.75% Note 1
Dawn Lescaudron	319	5.32%	-
Haider Shaikh	247	4.12%	-
Total votes	5,991	100%	
Registered voters	19,782	31.25%	
Note: All Hamilton Municipal Elections are officially non-partisan. Note: Candidate campaign colours are based on the prominent colour used in campaign items (signs, literature, etc.) and are used as a visual differentiation between candidates. Note 1: Results compared to 2004 By-Election
Sources: Hamilton, Ontario, City Clerk's Office

Candidates for the October 1, 2004 Hamilton, Ontario Ward 2 Councillor By-Election
Candidate	Popular vote		
Candidate	Votes	%	±%
Bob Bratina	1,856	37.74%	-
James Novak	1,152	22.80%	-4.84% (Note 1)
Don Drury	1,094	21.66%	-
Loren Lieberman	387	7.66%	-
Judy MacDonald-Musitano	304	6.02%	-
Robert Hugh Cameron	84	1.66%	-
Michael Baldasaro	52	1.03%	-
Alex Garofolo	43	0.85%	-
Keith Beck	29	0.57%	-
Dan Langan	29	0.57%	-
Jerry Moore	22	0.44%	-3.6% (Note 1)
Total votes	5,052		
Registered voters	25980	19.47%	-8.53%
Note: All Hamilton Municipal Elections are officially non-partisan. Note: Candidate campaign colours are based on the prominent colour used in campaign items (signs, literature, etc.) and are used as a visual differentiation between candidates. Note 1: Results compared to 2003 Municipal Election

== See also ==
- Hamilton City Council
