= Hamilton East—Stoney Creek (federal electoral district) =

Federal electoral district in Ontario, Canada

Coordinates: 43.230°N 79.733°W

Ontario electoral district
- Interactive map of riding boundaries from the 2025 federal election

Federal electoral district
- Legislature: House of Commons
MP
Ned Kuruc
Conservative
- District created: 2003
- First contested: 2004
- Last contested: 2025
- District webpage: profile, map

Demographics
- Population (2011): 107,786
- Electors (2015): 80,042
- Area (km²): 72
- Pop. density (per km²): 1,497
- Census division: Hamilton
- Census subdivision: Hamilton (part)

Hamilton East—Stoney Creek (French: Hamilton-Est—Stoney Creek) is a federal electoral district in Ontario, Canada, that has been represented in the House of Commons of Canada since 2004.

The riding was formed in 2003 from parts of the former ridings of Hamilton East and Stoney Creek.

Of the 115,709 constituents of the riding, a slight majority were previously constituents in the former riding of Stoney Creek. 58,462 constituents were part of the Stoney Creek riding while 57,247 constituents originated from Hamilton East.

This riding lost territory to Hamilton Centre during the 2012 electoral redistribution.

== Demographics ==
According to the 2021 Canadian census

Languages: 67.6% English, 3.5% Italian, 2.7% Serbian, 2.3% Punjabi, 2.2% Croatian, 1.9% Polish, 1.6% Spanish, 1.5% Arabic, 1.3% Urdu, 1.2% French, 1.1% Portuguese
Religions: 57.5% Christian (33.5% Catholic, 5.1% Christian Orthodox, 3.6% Anglican, 2.8% United Church, 1.5% Presbyterian, 1.0% Pentecostal, 10.0% other), 6.5% Muslim, 2.6% Sikh, 1.8% Hindu, 30.1% none
Median income: $38,800 (2020)
Average income: $47,360 (2020)

Panethnic groups in Hamilton East—Stoney Creek (2011−2021)
Panethnic group	2021		2016		2011	
Panethnic group	Pop.	%	Pop.	%	Pop.	%
European (Note: Statistic includes all persons that did not make up part of a visible minority or an indigenous identity.)	84,025	75.55%	87,070	81.16%	88,465	82.7%
South Asian	8,510	7.65%	6,595	6.15%	6,580	6.15%
African	4,770	4.29%	3,255	3.03%	2,540	2.37%
Southeast Asian (Note: Statistic includes total responses of "Filipino" and "Southeast Asian" under visible minority section on census.)	3,715	3.34%	2,600	2.42%	2,325	2.17%
Middle Eastern (Note: Statistic includes total responses of "West Asian" and "Arab" under visible minority section on census.)	2,885	2.59%	1,630	1.52%	1,285	1.2%
Indigenous	2,795	2.51%	2,775	2.59%	2,395	2.24%
Latin American	2,275	2.05%	1,300	1.21%	1,495	1.4%
East Asian (Note: Statistic includes total responses of "Chinese", "Korean", and "Japanese" under visible minority section on census.)	1,080	0.97%	1,080	1.01%	1,075	1%
Other/multiracial (Note: Statistic includes total responses of "Visible minority, n.i.e." and "Multiple visible minorities" under visible minority section on census.)	1,170	1.05%	970	0.9%	810	0.76%
Total responses	111,220	99.28%	107,280	99.47%	106,975	99.25%
Total population	112,028	100%	107,848	100%	107,786	100%
Notes: Totals greater than 100% due to multiple origin responses. Demographics based on 2012 Canadian federal electoral redistribution riding boundaries.

== Geography ==
It consists of the part of the City of Hamilton lying north of the Niagara Escarpment and east of Ottawa Street.

The riding consists of the neighbourhoods of, Cherry Heights, Homeside, Normanhurst, McQuesten, Glenview, Rosedale, Red Hill, Vincent, Gershome, Greenford, Corman, Kentley, Riverdale, Parkview West, Parkview East, Nashdale, Lake Grayside and the eastern half of The Delta in the former City of Hamilton plus the part of the former City of Stoney Creek north of the Niagara Escarpment including the "Old Town", Fruitland and Winona.

== Member of Parliament ==
This riding has elected the following members of Parliament:

Parliament	Years	Member	Party
Hamilton East—Stoney Creek; Riding created from Stoney Creek and Hamilton East
38th	2004–2006	Tony Valeri	Liberal
39th	2006–2008	Wayne Marston	New Democratic
40th	2008–2011	Wayne Marston	New Democratic
41st	2011–2015	Wayne Marston	New Democratic
42nd	2015–2019	Bob Bratina	Liberal
43rd	2019–2021	Bob Bratina	Liberal
44th	2021–2025	Chad Collins	Liberal
45th	2025–present	Ned Kuruc	Conservative

== Election results ==
View source data.
Graph of election results in Hamilton East—Stoney Creek (minor parties that never got 2% of the vote or didn't run consistently are omitted)

2025 Canadian federal election
Party	Candidate	Votes	%	±%	Expenditures
Conservative	Ned Kuruc	32,857	48.70	+18.69	$136,758.10
Liberal	Chad Collins	31,378	46.51	+7.37	$56,642.77
New Democratic	Nayla Mithani	2,471	3.66	–18.06	$0.00
People's	Jim Boutsikakis	762	1.13	–6.14	$2,924.00
Total valid votes/expense limit		67,468	99.16	–	?
Total rejected ballots		572	0.84		
Turnout		68,040	69.60	+10.30	
Eligible voters		97,757			
Conservative notional gain from Liberal		Swing		+5.58	
Source: Elections Canada

2021 Canadian federal election
Party	Candidate	Votes	%	±%	Expenditures
Liberal	Chad Collins	18,358	36.9	-1.7	$78,670.69
Conservative	Ned Kuruc	13,934	28.0	+2.8	$56,327.55
New Democratic	Nick Milanovic	12,748	25.6	-3.0	$76,637.28
People's	Mario Ricci	3,733	7.5	+5.4	$6,430.00
Green	Larry Pattison	1,020	2.0	-3.6	$0.00
Total valid votes/expense limit		49,793	99.0	+0.01	$114,317.99
Total rejected ballots		520	1.0		
Turnout		50,313	59.3		
Eligible voters		84,794			
Liberal hold		Swing		-2.3	
Source: Elections Canada

2021 federal election redistributed results
Party	Vote	%
Liberal	21,461	39.07
Conservative	16,546	30.12
New Democratic	11,910	21.68
People's	3,986	7.26
Green	1,022	1.86

2019 Canadian federal election: Hamilton East—Stoney Creek
Party	Candidate	Votes	%	±%	Expenditures
Liberal	Bob Bratina	20,112	38.57	-0.42	$70,837.02
New Democratic	Nick Milanovic	14,930	28.63	-4.08	$64,221.61
Conservative	Nikki Kaur	13,130	25.18	-0.08	$75,555.96
Green	Peter Ormond	2,902	5.57	+2.97	$4,130.84
People's	Charles Crocker	1,072	2.06		none listed
Total valid votes/expense limit		52,146	98.99		
Total rejected ballots		533	1.01	+0.43	
Turnout		52,679	61.79	-0.99	
Eligible voters		85,252			
Liberal hold		Swing		+1.83	
Source: Elections Canada

2015 Canadian federal election
Party	Candidate	Votes	%	±%	Expenditures
Liberal	Bob Bratina	19,622	38.99	+25.41	$64,967.22
New Democratic	Wayne Marston	16,465	32.71	-11.54	$69,194.30
Conservative	Diane Bubanko	12,715	25.26	-11.66	$23,736.31
Green	Erin Davis	1,305	2.59	-0.26	$1,551.87
Communist	Bob Mann	170	0.34		–
Marxist–Leninist	Wendell Fields	55	0.11		–
Total valid votes/expense limit		50,332	99.42		$215,134.00
Total rejected ballots		293	0.58		
Turnout		50,625	62.78		
Eligible voters		80,639			
Liberal gain from New Democratic		Swing		+18.48	
Source: Elections Canada

2011 federal election redistributed results
Party	Vote	%
New Democratic	19,848	44.26
Conservative	16,557	36.92
Liberal	6,089	13.58
Green	1,278	2.85
Others	1,075	2.40

2011 Canadian federal election
Party	Candidate	Votes	%	±%	Expenditures
New Democratic	Wayne Marston	21,931	45.18	+3.90	
Conservative	Brad Clark	17,567	36.19	+12.24	
Liberal	Michelle Stockwell	6,411	13.21	-14.67	
Green	Dave William Hart Dyke	1,450	2.99	-1.44	
Progressive Canadian	Gord Hill	486	1.00	-0.76	
Libertarian	Greg Pattinson	385	0.79	–	
Communist	Bob Mann	138	0.28	–	
Marxist–Leninist	Wendell Fields	95	0.20	–	
Canadian Action	Bob Green Innes	92	0.19	–	
Total valid votes		48,537	100.00		
Total rejected ballots		368	0.75	+0.11	
Turnout		48,905	57.64	+1.05	
Eligible voters		84,848	–	–	

2008 Canadian federal election
Party	Candidate	Votes	%	±%	Expenditures
New Democratic	Wayne Marston	19,919	41.28	+5.25	$86,339
Liberal	Larry Di Ianni	13,455	27.88	-7.28	$65,307
Conservative	Frank Rukavina	11,556	23.95	-1.34	$89,165
Green	David William Hart Dyke	2,142	4.43	+1.50	$500
Progressive Canadian	Gord Hill	853	1.76	–	$1,917
Independent	Sam Cino	323	0.66	–	$364
Total valid votes/expense limit		48,143	100.00	$89,236	
Total rejected ballots		311	0.64		
Turnout		48,559	56.59		

2006 Canadian federal election
Party	Candidate	Votes	%	±%
New Democratic	Wayne Marston	19,346	36.03	+0.19
Liberal	Tony Valeri	18,880	35.16	-2.58
Conservative	Frank Rukavina	13,581	25.29	+2.98
Green	Jo Pavlov	1,573	2.93	-0.03
Communist	Bob Mann	316	0.59	+0.25
Total valid votes		53,696	100.00	
New Democratic Party gain from Liberal		Swing	-1.4	

2004 Canadian federal election
Party	Candidate	Votes	%
Liberal	Tony Valeri	18,417	37.74
New Democratic	Tony Depaulo	17,490	35.84
Conservative	Fred Eisenberger	10,888	22.31
Green	Richard Safka	1,446	2.96
Independent	Sam Cino	393	0.81
Communist	Bob Mann	166	0.34
Total valid votes		48,800	100.00

== See also ==
- List of Canadian electoral districts
- Historical federal electoral districts of Canada
