= Wayne Marston =

Canadian politician

Wayne L. Marston
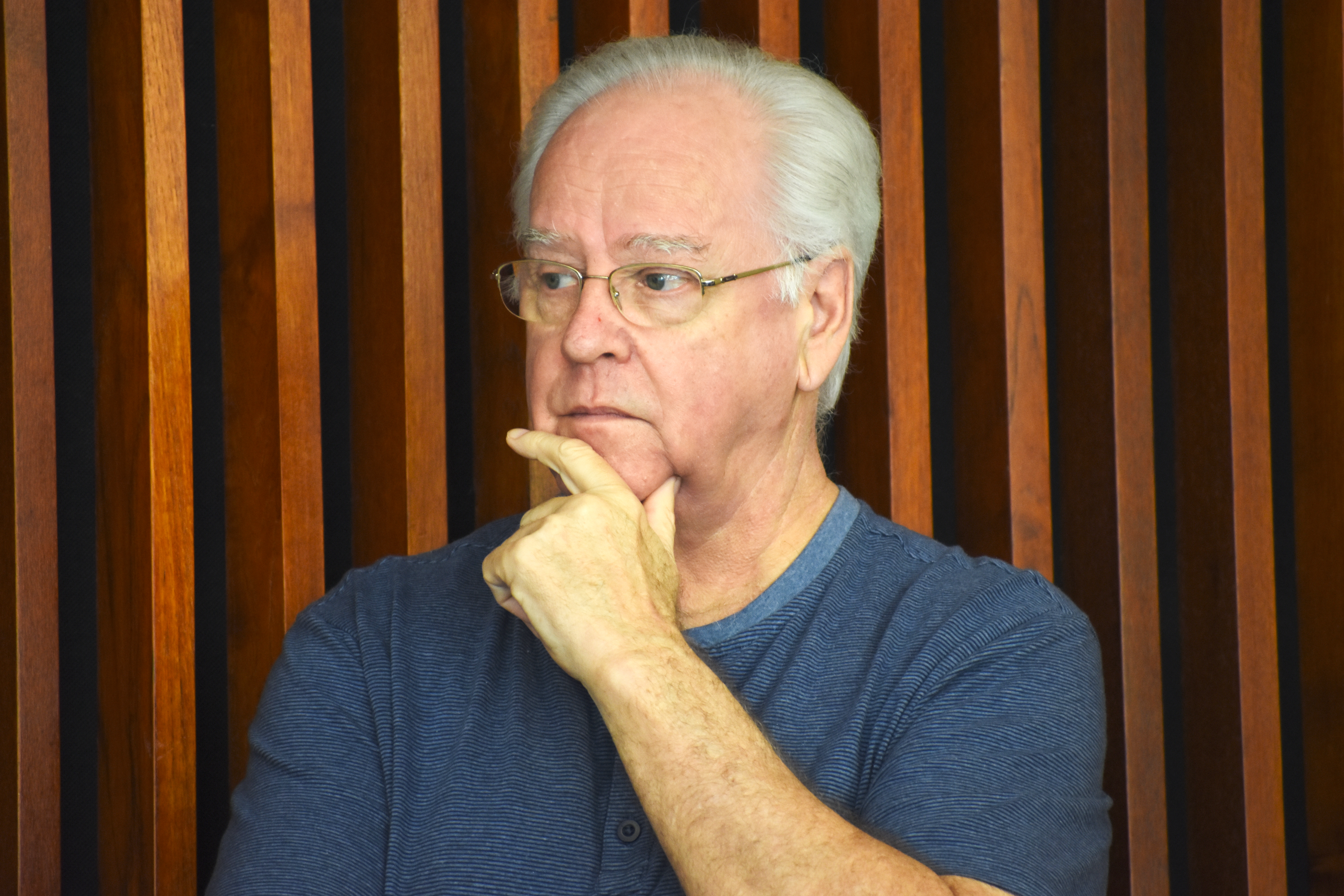

Member of Parliament for Hamilton East—Stoney Creek
- In office January 23, 2006 – October 19, 2015
- Preceded by: Tony Valeri
- Succeeded by: Bob Bratina

Personal details
- Born: February 27, 1947 (age 79) Sisson Ridge, New Brunswick
- Party: New Democratic Party
- Spouse: Barbara Marston
- Profession: Technician

Wayne L. Marston (born February 27, 1947, in Sisson Ridge, New Brunswick) is a former New Democratic Party (NDP) politician in Canada. He was the Member of Parliament (MP) representing the Hamilton, Ontario riding of Hamilton East—Stoney Creek from 2006 to 2015.

== Electoral history ==
Marston was first elected as MP in the 2006 federal election, defeating incumbent Liberal MP Tony Valeri by a 466-vote margin. He was subsequently reelected in 2008 and 2011. He lost his seat in the 2015 election to the Liberal candidate, and former Hamilton mayor, Bob Bratina.

Before he was elected to House of Commons, Marston served as President of the Hamilton and District Labour Council for 11 years. He co-chaired the organizing committee of the Hamilton Days of Action, February 23–24, 1996, in which 100,000 people marched on the Ontario Progressive Conservative convention in Hamilton, February 24, 1996. Marston was also a School Board Trustee for Ward 5 of the Hamilton-Wentworth District School Board from 2000 until his resignation, after his federal election victory, on January 24, 2006.

Marston had previously run for the NDP in the former federal riding of Hamilton East in the 1993 and 1997 Canadian federal elections. He lost to Liberal cabinet minister Sheila Copps both times. He was also the NDP candidate in the 1996 Hamilton East by-election, triggered by Copps' resignation over her government's failure to repeal the unpopular goods and services tax as she and her party had promised in 1993.

Although Copps ran in and won the 1996 by-election, Marston finished a strong second to her, reducing Copps' margin of victory significantly. Copps' riding was once the strongest Liberal riding in the Hamilton area (holding even during the Progressive Conservatives' sweep under Brian Mulroney in 1984) but after the by-election, Hamilton East emerged as the weakest Liberal riding in the Hamilton area; Hamilton West, Hamilton Mountain and Stoney Creek all subsequently gave the Liberals larger margins of victory. Copps also lost personal standing within the Liberal Party after the by-election, and she was eventually lost to fellow Liberal MP Tony Valeri in a pitched battle for the Liberal nomination in the new Hamilton East—Stoney Creek riding when it was created out of her former Hamilton East riding and Valeri's former Stoney Creek riding in 2004.
