= Ned Kuruc =

Canadian politician

Ned Kuruc MP

Member of Parliament for Hamilton East—Stoney Creek
- Incumbent
- Assumed office April 28, 2025
- Preceded by: Chad Collins

Personal details
- Party: Conservative
- Profession: Businessperson • mortgage specialist

Nenad "Ned" Kuruc MP is a Canadian politician from the Conservative Party of Canada. He was elected Member of Parliament for Hamilton East—Stoney Creek in the 2025 Canadian federal election. Prior to being elected, Kuruc worked as an entrepreneur, owning and operating businesses such as Neku Cannabis, and served as Director of Events and Fighter Acquisitions at K-1 Global.

== Early life and background ==
Kuruc was born in raised in Hamilton, Ontario, where he has lived his entire life. He graduated from Orchard Park Secondary School in 1999. His parents Ilija and Ivanka immigrated to Canada in 1967 from Strmica, Yugoslavia. He is the father of three children.

His biography on the Conservative Party of Canada website states that he is a local entrepreneur and a former global sports entertainment executive. Kuruc's business experience includes work in the cannabis, real estate, restaurant, and martial arts spaces.

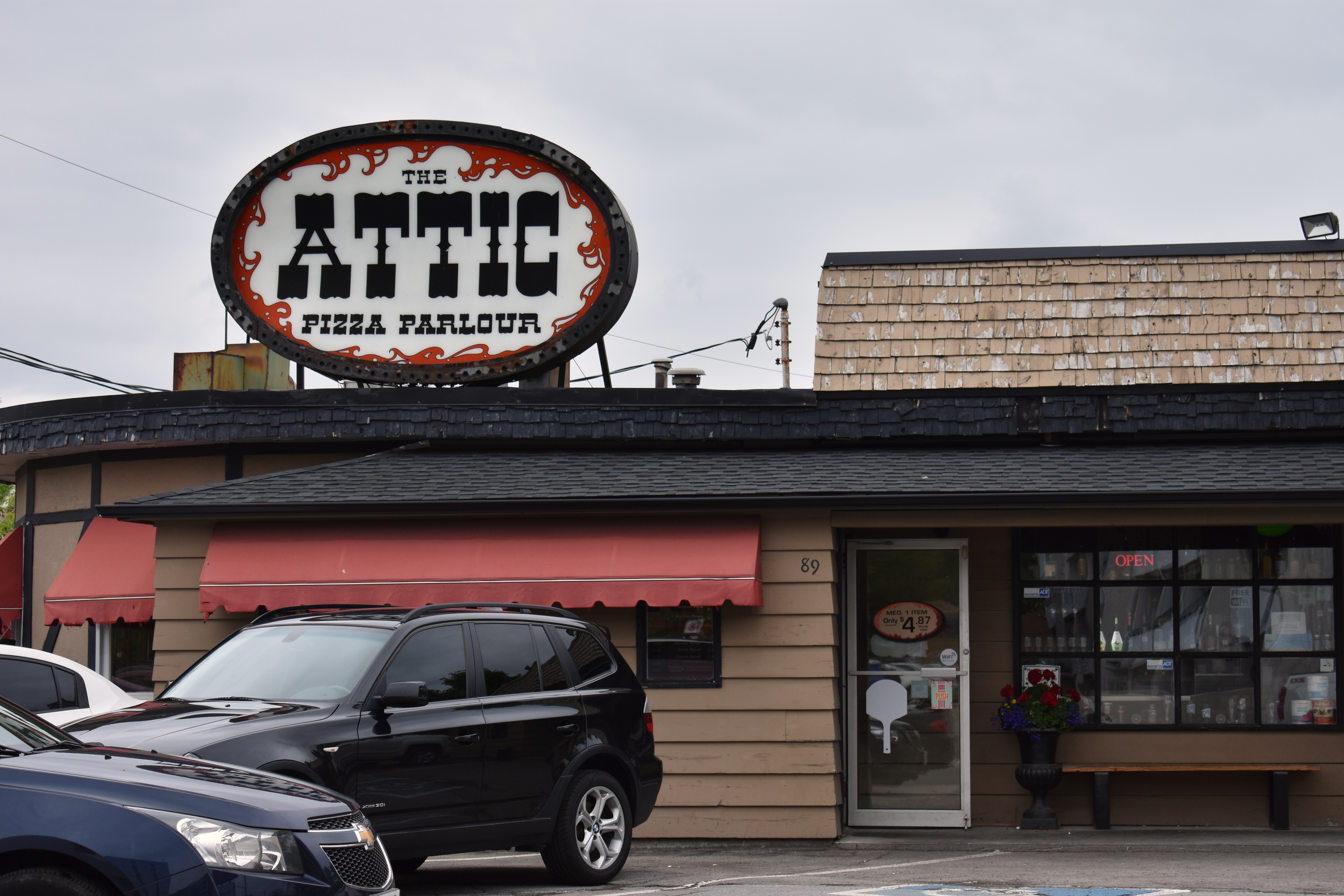
Downtown Stoney Creek's The Attic Pizza Parlour, formerly owned by Kuruc.

Kuruc is the former owner of Stoney Creek's Attic Pizza, which reopened under new ownership in November 2023. Kuruc has also stated that he has previously owned bars and night clubs in Hess Village.

=== Cannabis business ===
Kuruc is the owner of three cannabis dispensaries, including Neku Cannabis in Stoney Creek and its sister locations on Upper James Street and in Hamilton's Hess Village.

In 2020, Kuruc converted his former bar Che Burrito & Lounge into a cannabis retailer to replace lost customers due to the COVID-19 pandemic. Kuruc stated in 2020 that his goal was to create unique cannabis stores that focused on art and culture, and expressed an interest in expanding the Neku Cannabis brand around Ontario.

In 2020, the Hamilton Spectator reported that Kuruc had sought a licence from the Alcohol and Gaming Commission of Ontario to convert Stoney Creek's Attic Pizza into a marijuana dispensary known as Neku Cannabis. The opening of Neku Cannabis caused controversy in Stoney Creek, with news reportings indicating that many residents were opposed to Kuruc's plans to expand his cannabis brand into downtown Stoney Creek.

=== Combative Sports Advisory Council ===
In 2024, Kuruc was appointed to the Minister of Tourism, Sport and Culture's Combative Sport Advisory Council. The appointment was made on the recommendation of Ontario's Minister of Tourism, Sport and Culture, Neil Lumsden, who also serves as the Progressive Conservative Member of Provincial Parliament for Hamilton East-Stoney Creek.

== Political career ==
=== Municipal politics ===
Prior to being elected as the Member of Parliament for Hamilton East-Stoney Creek in April 2025, Kuruc had previously ran unsuccessfully for City Councillor in Hamilton's Ward 3 in 2018, finishing third with 13.83% of the vote.

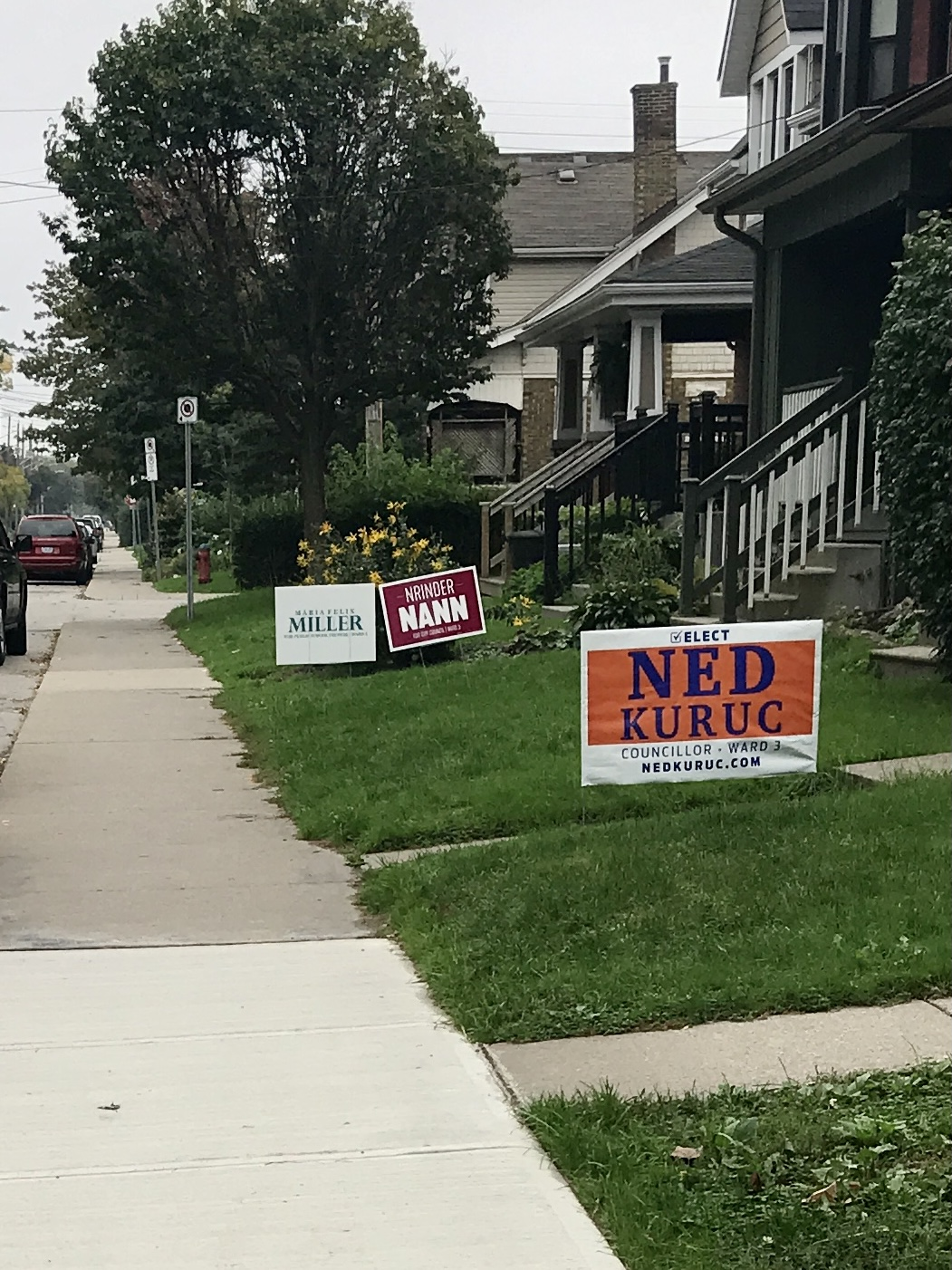
A Kuruc election sign in the 2018 Hamilton municipal election, which Kuruc lost to Nrinder Nann.

=== Federal politics ===
Kuruc was the Conservative Party of Canada candidate for Hamilton East-Stoney Creek in 2021 federal election, where he finished second to Liberal candidate Chad Collins. Following his defeat, Kuruc described Collins as "a mountain of a politician".

In a 2023 interview with Paul Wells, Kuruc attributed his defeat in the 2021 election to then-Conservative Party leader Erin O'Toole's decision to support the Liberal's policies on gun control and impose COVID-19 restrictions, which Kuruc stated drove potential supporters to Maxime Bernier's People's Party of Canada. Kuruc stated that he viewed the Conservative Party of Canada's loss in 2021 as being due to the Conservative Party not being conservative enough.

In the lead-up to the 2025 election, Kuruc was endorsed by former mayor of Hamilton Bob Bratina. Bratina had previously served as Member of Parliament for Hamilton East-Stoney Creek for the Liberal Party of Canada, before opting not to seek re-election in 2021 due to his opposition of the federal government's decision to fund Hamilton's light rail transit project. Bratina ran for mayor of Hamilton in 2022, where he finished in third place with 12.27% of the vote, behind Andrea Horwath and Keanin Loomis.

Kuruc opted not to participate in the 2025 Cable 14 televised Hamilton East-Stoney Creek debate. In a post on social media platform X, Cable 14 noted that Liberal candidate Chad Collins was the only candidate to accept an invitation to participate.

On April 28, 2025, Kuruc narrowly defeated Liberal Member of Parliament Chad Collins, winning by a margin of just over 2% of the vote. Former Deputy Prime Minister and Liberal Member of Parliament Sheila Copps stated that Kuruc's victory was due in large part to the redistribution of the riding of Hamilton East-Stoney Creek. The boundaries of Hamilton East-Stoney Creek changed prior to the 2025 election, adding a large portion of Upper Stoney Creek. Both Kuruc and Collins significantly increased the vote shares they received in the 2021 election, while the voting share of the New Democratic Party candidate dropped to 3.63% in the 2025 election.

At the time of the 2025 Canadian federal election, he lived in Stoney Creek, Ontario.

=== Political views ===
Kuruc has criticized what he refers to as "woke" Liberal-government policies. In a 2023 interview, Kuruc criticized the "whole woke agenda", which he said "[p]eople are tired of", and expressed sympathy for the 2022 Freedom Convoy of truckers who protested COVID-19 restrictions in Ottawa. In 2024, he criticized the incumbent Liberal government as being "weak, woke, wacko and wasteful".

On the tariffs imposed by US President Donald Trump, Kuruc blamed the Canadian government, stating in 2025, "the reason the tariffs are in place is because of the failures of the Liberal government".

Kuruc supported Pierre Poilievre in the 2022 Conservative Party Leadership Race, who has described himself as a "true conservative" and is generally seen as being on the further right side of the Conservative Party.

== Electoral record ==
=== Federal ===
2025 Canadian federal election: Hamilton East—Stoney Creek
Party	Candidate	Votes	%	±%	Expenditures
Conservative	Ned Kuruc	32,857	48.7	+18.60	
Liberal	Chad Collins	31,378	46.5	+7.44	
New Democratic	Nayla Mithani	2,471	3.7	–18.05	
People's	Jim Boutsikakis	762	1.1	–6.12	
Total valid votes/expense limit		67,468	99.2	+2.0	
Total rejected ballots		572	0.8	–2.0	
Turnout		68,040	69.6	+10.3	
Eligible voters		97,757			
Conservative gain from Liberal		Swing		+5.58	
Source: Elections Canada

2021 Canadian federal election: Hamilton East—Stoney Creek
Party	Candidate	Votes	%	±%	Expenditures
Liberal	Chad Collins	18,358	36.9	-1.7	$78,670.69
Conservative	Ned Kuruc	13,934	28.0	+2.8	$56,327.55
New Democratic	Nick Milanovic	12,748	25.6	-3.0	$76,637.28
People's	Mario Ricci	3,733	7.5	+5.4	$6,430.00
Green	Larry Pattison	1,020	2.0	-3.6	$0.00
Total valid votes/expense limit		49,793	99.0	+0.01	$114,317.99
Total rejected ballots		520	1.0		
Turnout		50,313	59.3		
Eligible voters		84,794			
Liberal hold		Swing		-2.3	
Source: Elections Canada

=== Municipal ===
Candidates for the October 22, 2018 Hamilton, Ontario Ward 3 Councillor Election
Candidate	Popular vote			Expenditures
Candidate	Votes	%	±%	Expenditures
Nrinder Nann	2,618	33.96%	-	$20,787.33
Laura Farr	1,471	19.08%	-	$6,743.99
Ned Kuruc	1,066	13.83%	-	$19,115.22
Amanda Salonen	552	7.16%	-	-^{1}
Dan Smith	474	6.15%	-	$5,566.82
Alain Bureau	314	4.07%	-	$9,959.77 ^{2}
Milena Balta	269	3.49%	-	$4,880.45
Stephen Rowe	232	3.01%	-	$1,620.95
Brendan Kavanaugh	213	2.76%	-	-^{1}
Tony Lemma	196	2.54%	-	$3,965.36
Kristeen Sprague	120	1.56%	-	-^{1}
Steven Paul Denault	100	1.30%	-	$1,659.00
Keith Beck	83	1.08%	-	$0
Total votes	7,708			
Registered voters	24,626	31.3%	+1.71%	
^{1} These candidates did not submit official Financial Statements and are, therefore, ineligible to run in the 2022 election^{2} These candidates were delayed in submitting their official Financial Statements and have been barred from running in the 2022 Municipal election Note: All Hamilton Municipal Elections are officially non-partisan. Note: Candidate campaign colours are based on the prominent colour used in campaign items (signs, literature, etc.) and are used as a visual differentiation between candidates.
Sources: City of Hamilton, "Nominated Candidates"
