= Chad Collins (politician) =

Canadian politician

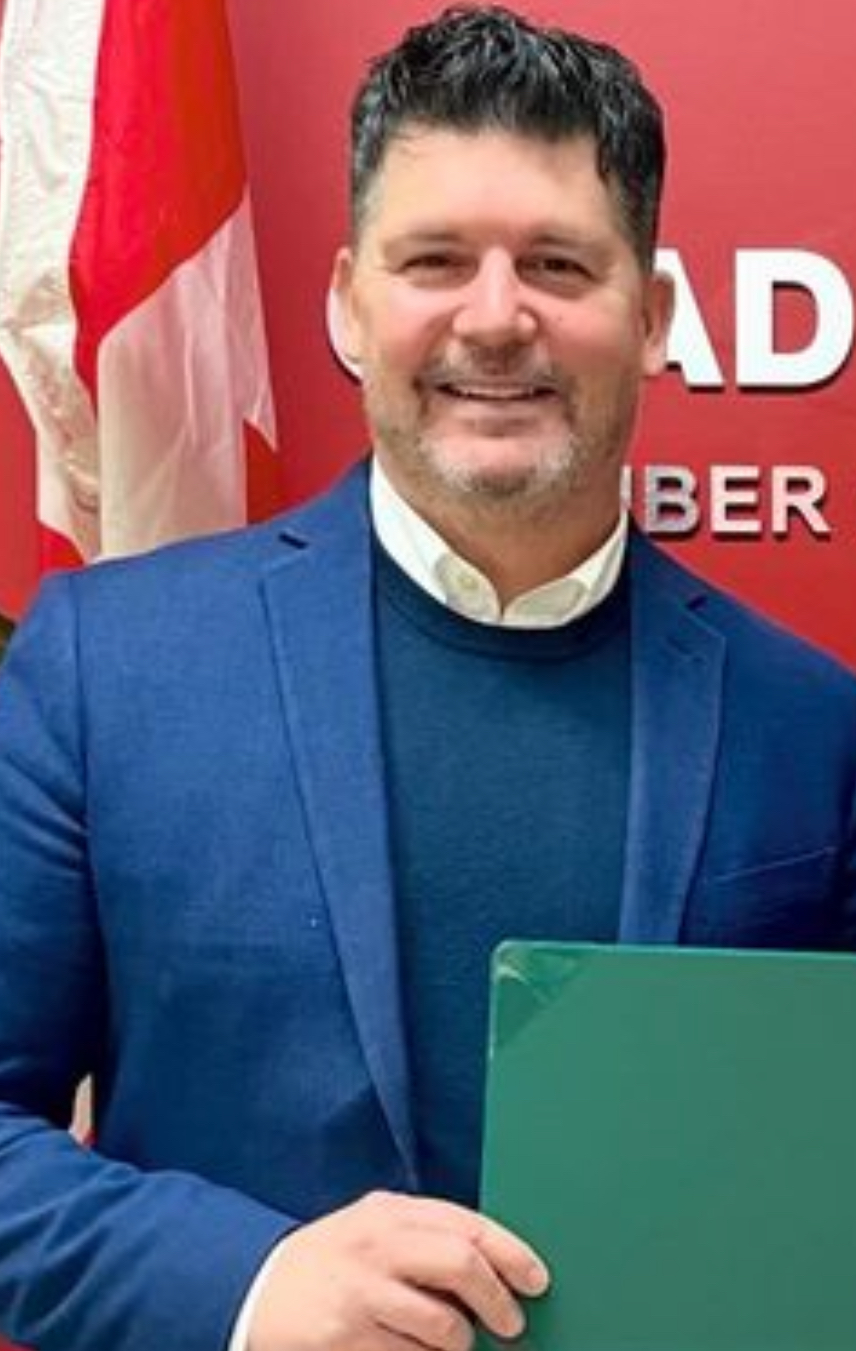
- Collins in April 2024

Member of Parliament for Hamilton East—Stoney Creek
- In office 20 September 2021 – 23 March 2025
- Preceded by: Bob Bratina
- Succeeded by: Ned Kuruc

Hamilton City Councillor
- In office 1995 – 25 September 2021
- Preceded by: Dominic Agostino
- Succeeded by: Russ Powers
- Constituency: Ward 5

Personal details
- Born: January 1971 (age 55) Hamilton, Ontario, Canada
- Party: Liberal
- Parent: Shirley Collins
- Education: University of Western Ontario, McMaster University
- Occupation: Politician

Chad Collins is a Canadian politician who was elected to the House of Commons of Canada in the 2021 federal election. He represented Hamilton East—Stoney Creek as a member of the Liberal Party.

Prior to being elected, Collins was a Hamilton, Ontario City Councillor. He was born and raised in Hamilton and attended Glendale Secondary School. He is married and has two children. (Note: Craggs, Samantha (2021-09-18). "Riding profile: Councillor, lawyer and 'regular guy' running in Hamilton East-Stoney Creek". CBC Hamilton.) He is the son of former Ontario provincial MPP Shirley Collins.

Chad Collins was first elected to Hamilton City Council in 1995 and served on council until 2021, when he became the Member of Parliament for Hamilton East - Stoney Creek.

== Political career ==
=== City Council ===
Chad Collins was a Hamilton City Councillor for more than 25 years. He was elected at age 24 to serve as the Ward 5 City Councillor.

For a period of time as a City Councillor, he was president of CityHousing Hamilton. During that time, he addressed the City's aging affordable housing stock and advocated for both provincial and federal funding to help increase Hamilton's supply of affordable housing.

His efforts included convincing fellow councillors to allocate area rating money to repair social housing units and donate a vacant parking lot to an affordable housing provider.

His other housing initiatives included the creation of a local Tenant Defence Fund to assist tenants with rising rents.

=== Federal politics ===
Chad Collins was elected as Member of Parliament for Hamilton East - Stoney Creek on September 20, 2021.

Among his committee duties, he was a member of the Human Resources, Skills and Social Development and the Status of Persons with Disabilities (HUMA) for the entire term of the 44th Parliament.

The HUMA committee plays a crucial role in reviewing and studying legislation related to disability payments like the Canada Disability Benefit.

In November 2024, when the federal government proposed giving out $250 cheques to anyone who was employed and making less than $150,000, Collins said publicly that he would not vote in alignment with his party unless seniors and people with disabilities were included to receive the payment. He told the Toronto Star that he was threatened with consequences from the Liberal Party for his stance.

As a child, Collins lived in social housing for six years, which helped shaped his desire to find solutions for more affordable housing. Shortly after being elected Member of Parliament, Collins began chairing the Liberal National Housing Caucus. He was praised by Prime Minister Justin Trudeau for his work in helping create recommendations that were the blueprint for Canada's Housing Plan, to make it easier to own or rent a home.

As Prime Minister Trudeau's popularity declined, Collins was one of the first Members of Parliament to go on record asking for the Prime Minister to resign. In October 2024, he signed a letter with 23 other MPs to formally request Trudeau step down.

Collins stated it was unlikely he would run again for re-election as MP if Trudeau stayed, but would do so if a new leader was chosen.

The boundaries for the Hamilton East - Stoney Creek federal constituency changed significantly from when Collins first ran in 2021 and when he ran for re-election in 2025. The riding lost the Rosedale and surrounding area to Hamilton Centre and gained Upper Stoney Creek and the Hannon area, which had previously been part of the Flamborough - Glanbrook riding, held by the Conservative Party since it was created in 2015.

Collins increased the votes he received from 18,358 votes in 2021 to 31,372 votes in 2025, but ultimately lost the seat by 2.21% to the Conservatives.

== Election results ==
2025 Canadian federal election: Hamilton East—Stoney Creek
Party	Candidate	Votes	%	±%	Expenditures
Conservative	Ned Kuruc	32,857	48.70	+18.69	$136,758.10
Liberal	Chad Collins	31,378	46.51	+7.37	$56,642.77
New Democratic	Nayla Mithani	2,471	3.66	–18.06	$0.00
People's	Jim Boutsikakis	762	1.13	–6.14	$2,924.00
Total valid votes/expense limit		67,468	99.16	–	?
Total rejected ballots		572	0.84		
Turnout		68,040	69.60	+10.30	
Eligible voters		97,757			
Conservative notional gain from Liberal		Swing		+5.58	
Source: Elections Canada

2021 Canadian federal election: Hamilton East—Stoney Creek
Party	Candidate	Votes	%	±%	Expenditures
Liberal	Chad Collins	18,358	36.9	-1.7	$78,670.69
Conservative	Ned Kuruc	13,934	28.0	+2.8	$56,327.55
New Democratic	Nick Milanovic	12,748	25.6	-3.0	$76,637.28
People's	Mario Ricci	3,733	7.5	+5.4	$6,430.00
Green	Larry Pattison	1,020	2.0	-3.6	$0.00
Total valid votes/expense limit		49,793	99.0	+0.01	$114,317.99
Total rejected ballots		520	1.0		
Turnout		50,313	59.3		
Eligible voters		84,794			
Liberal hold		Swing		-2.3	
Source: Elections Canada

Candidates for the 22 October 2018 Hamilton, Ontario Ward 5 Councillor Election

Candidate	Popular vote			Expenditures
Candidate	Votes	%	±%	Expenditures
Chad Collins (incumbent)	7,596	80.38%	+8.70	$12,016.03
Juanita Maldonado	1,340	14.16%	-	$1,450.00
Stewart Klazinga	526	5.56%	-	$1,724.35
Total votes	9,462			
Registered voters	26,881	35.2%	+1.56%	
^{1} These candidates did not submit official Financial Statements and are, therefore, ineligible to run in the 2022 Municipal election Note: All Hamilton Municipal Elections are officially non-partisan. Note: Candidate campaign colours are based on the prominent colour used in campaign items (signs, literature, etc.) and are used as a visual differentiation between candidates.
Sources: City of Hamilton, "Nominated Candidates"

Candidates for the 27 October 2014 Hamilton, Ontario Ward Five Councillor Election
Candidate	Popular vote			Expenditures
Candidate	Votes	%	±%	Expenditures
Chad Collins (incumbent)	6,138	71.58%	+4.66%	$22,484.82
David Brown	1,134	13.22%	–	$11,977.84
George Rusich	1,133	13.21%	–	$4,305.38
Larry Storm	170	1.98%	–	$453.27
Total votes	8,723	33.64%	−7.66%	
Registered voters	25,929	100%		
^{1} These candidates did not submit official Financial Statements and are, therefore, ineligible to run in the 2018 Municipal election Note: All Hamilton Municipal Elections are officially non-partisan. Note: Candidate campaign colours are based on the prominent colour used in campaign items (signs, literature, etc.) and are used as a visual differentiation between candidates.
Sources: City of Hamilton, "Nominated Candidates"Archived 2010-08-20 at the Wayback Machine
